= Rondon Commission =

The Rondon Commission (Portuguese: Comissão Rondon) was one of the expeditionary groups established by the Brazilian government in 1907 under President Afonso Pena. Officially named the Commission for Strategic Telegraph Lines from Mato Grosso to Amazonas (Comissão de Linhas Telegráficas Estratégicas de Mato Grosso ao Amazonas, in Portuguese), the Rondon Commission was established to build a telegraph network connecting the central-western region to the Amazon. Led by then-Major Cândido Mariano da Silva Rondon, the commission played a key role in the territorial integration of Brazil and the expansion of national communications infrastructure. In addition to its technical mission, the commission carried out significant scientific work in geography, ethnography, botany, zoology, astronomy, and geology. The commission contacted dozens of Indigenous groups along the mapped routes, producing a large volume of ethnographic and iconographic material.

== Vocabularies ==
As part of its ethnographic work, the Rondon Commission gathered numerous vocabularies and linguistic data from the Indigenous groups it encountered throughout its expeditions. These collections included basic lexicons, grammatical structures, and phonetic observations of a variety of languages spoken in the Brazilian interior, many of which had little or no prior documentation.

The vocabularies were essential not only for facilitating peaceful contact and communication with the Indigenous peoples, but also for preserving knowledge of linguistic diversity in Brazil. The collected material later served as valuable sources for linguistic, anthropological, and historical research, and some of it was incorporated into publications and archives, contributing to the early foundations of Brazilian Indigenous linguistics, these vocabularies included:

- Anauquá (Nahukuá)
- Apiacá (Apiaká)
- Ariquême (Ariken)
- Aroá (Aruá)
- Auití (Awetí)
- Bacairí (Bakairí)
- Bacaerí e Nhambiquára (Bakairí e Nanbikuára)
- Bacairí (Bakairí)
- Boróro (Bororo)
- Caiapós (Kayapó)
- Camaiurá (Kamayurá)
- Canela e Guajajára (Canelas e Guajajára)
- Caraó
- Carahús
- Carajá (Karajá)
- Carajá e Javaé (Karajá e Javaé)
- Caripúna (Karipúna)
- Caxinití (Kaxinití)
- Caxuiána (Kaxuiâna)
- Cayabí (Kayabí)
- Congorês ou Cocúzus (Congorê)
- Chipáya (Xipáya)
- Galibí
- Guaycurú (Guaikurú)
- Iaulaptí (Yawarapití)
- Inhahuquá (Nahukuá) (veja Anauquá)
- Ipoteuát (Ipotuát)
- Kipkiriruát (Kepkiriwát)
- Laiana (Layâna)
- Laiana e Quiniquináo (Layâna e Kinikináo)
- Maiongón (Mayongóng)
- Maiongon e Macú (Maiongóng e Makú)
- Macú (Makú)
- Macuráp (Makuráp)
- Macuxi (Makuxí)
- Massacá (Masaká)
- Meináco (Mehináku)
- Moxos (da Bolívia)
- Mundurucú (Mundurukú)
- Nhambiquára (Nanbikuára)
- Oiampí (Oyanpík)
- Pacanóvas (Pakahás-Nóvas)
- Paricí (Paresí)
- Purus-Borás (Puruborá)
- Pauatê (Pawatê)
- Pianocotó (Pianokotó)
- Rangu (Nação Tirió)
- Tacuatepé (Takuatép)
- Tamaindê (Tamaindê)
- Tapanhumas (Tapayúna)
- Taurepám (Taulipáng)
- Terena (Terêna)
- Ticúna (Tikúna)
- Trumay (Trumaí)
- Uará (Waurá)
- Uapixâna (Wapitxâna)
- Uaurá (Waurá) (veja Uará)
- Uaurá e Meináco (Waurá e Mehináku)
- Uómos
- Umotína
- Urubú
- Urumí
- Xavánte
- Xirianán (Xirianá)
- Xirihaná
