= Jê–Tupi–Carib languages =

Proposed language family of South America

Jê–Tupi–Carib
- (proposed)
- Geographic distribution: eastern South America, Caribbean
- Linguistic classification: Proposed language family
- Subdivisions: Macro-Jê; Tupian; Carib

Language codes
- Glottolog: None

Jê–Tupi–Carib (or TuKaJê) is a proposed language family composed of the Macro-Jê, Tupian and Cariban languages of South America. Aryon Rodrigues (2000) based this proposal on shared morphological patterns. In an earlier proposal, Rodrigues (1985) had also proposed a Tupí-Cariban language family.

The Je-Tupi-Carib proposal replaces earlier long-range hypotheses, e.g. Greenberg's phyla "Jê-Pano-Carib" (linking Macro-Jê and Cariban to Panoan) and "Tupi-Arawak" (linking Tupian to Arawakan), or Mason's "Macro-Tupí-Guaranían" family (1950: 236–238) which groups Tupian together with Bora–Witoto and Zaparoan.

However, in some cases, similarities among the language families are clearly due to more recent linguistic diffusion, as with Tupian and Jê languages (Timbira; Guajajara, Tembe, Guaja, Urubu-Ka'apor, etc.) in the lower Tocantins-Mearim area. Linguistic diffusion among Jê, Tupian, Cariban, Arawakan, and Trumai languages is also evident among the languages of the Xingu Indigenous Park.

== Comparison ==
=== Nikulin (2015) ===
Nikulin (2015) compared the vocabulary of Proto-Macro-Jê, Proto-Tupí, and Proto-Carib. In this comparison, only four matches were found among all three proto-languages: 'name', 'tooth', 'to eat', and 'ear'.

Comparison of Proto-Macro-Jê (with W = Proto-Western Macro-Jê; E = Proto-Eastern Macro-Jê), Proto-Tupí, and Proto-Karib from Nikulin (2015)
Meaning	Proto-Macro-Jê	Proto-Tupí	Proto-Karib
‘we’	*ka (W)	*oɾʸe / *oɾʸo= (excl.),*Vy= (?) (incl.)	*apina (excl.), *kɨwɨ-ɾə (incl.)
‘two’	*ɾey	not reconstructible	*atyəkə
‘I’	*iK=, *ba= (?)	*õn / *o=	*əwɨ-ɾə
‘eye’	*ⁿdʌm	*=eča	*=ənu
‘you’	*aC=, *ka=	*ẽn / *e=	*əmə-ɾə
‘fire’	*ʆɯm	*=atʸa	*wapoto (?)
‘tongue’	*ʆɔ̃ỹᵊtʌy / *ɲɔ̃ỹᵊtʌy	*kʸũ	*nuɾu
‘stone’	*kɾaT ~ *kɾaK	*wita	*təpu
‘name’	*(ʆi=)yit	*=et	*=ətetɨ
‘hand’	*ⁿbo	*po / *ⁿpo	*=əmiya
‘to die’	*tɯC	*pap	*ɾəməpə
‘to drink’	*ʆop / *yop	*kʼu ‘to eat, to drink’	*ənɨɾɨ
‘louse’	*ⁿgot (E), *tit (W) (?)	*ⁿkɨp	*(w)ayamə
‘moon’	*Pãɲɔ̃t (E)	*wačɨ	*nunnə
‘nail’	*pṼ=ʆay	*po=ape / *ⁿpo=ape	*=amoti
‘blood’	*ʆVⁿbV / *yVⁿbV (W)	*=Vʔɨ	*munu (*mɨnu?)
‘one’	*piyit (E)	not reconstructible	*əwinə
‘tooth’	*ʆɔy / *yɔy	*=ãỹ	*=ə
‘new’	*tʌbⁿ	not reconstructible	not reconstructible
‘dry’	*tVgⁿ	*ⁿkãŋ (Proto-TG-Awetí-Mawé)	*umɨna (?)
‘liver’	*ⁿbaT ~ *ⁿbaK	*pɨʔa	*=əɾe
‘to eat’	*ku(C)	*kʼu ‘to eat, to drink’	*ətəku
‘tail’	*ⁿbɯn	*=uway	*=kɨ (N)
‘this’	*toC	not reconstructible	*tə
‘hair’	*ʆi(C) (W)	*=ap	*(=e)tipotɨ
‘water’	*ⁿbiVk (W) (*koy ‘river’ (E))	*kʼɨ	*tuna
‘nose’	*ʆĩya(C) / *ɲĩya(C)	*ãpɨy	*=əwna
‘not’	*tɔ̃T ~ *tɔ̃K	*=ãm (suffix)	*=ɾa, *=pɨɾa
‘mouth’	*ʆaɾᵊ(-kɔy) / *yaɾᵊ(-kɔy)	*=ẽn	*mɨta
‘ear’	*ʆĩp=pV(C) / *ɲĩp=pV(C) (W)	*apɨ	*pana
‘that’	*nã (W) (?)	not reconstructible	*mə
‘bird’	*pɾɤy(ᵊ) (E) (?),*ⁿbVkɾa(C) (W)	not reconstructible	*toɾono
‘bone’	*ʆik / *yik	*kãŋ	*ye
‘sun’	*Pãɲɔ̃t (E), *kɾV(M)PV(W)	*ⁿkʷat	*titi
‘tree’	*kop	*kʼɨp	*yeye
‘ashes’	*ⁿbɾʌk	not reconstructible	*əɾuno
‘to give’	*ʆɔ̃p / *ɲɔ̃p	*=ũm	*utu
‘rain’	*ⁿdVy	*(ã)mãn	*konopo
‘fish’	*mĩKnũ (W)	*ɨp, *potʸ, *poɾʸɨp	*woto, *kana
‘neck’	*ʆok- / *yok-	*wut	*pɨmɨ (N)
‘breast’	*kɤp ~ *kɛp (E) (?)	*ⁿkãm	*manatɨ
‘leaf’	*ʆoyᵊ (E), *ʆaɾɔ(C) (W)	*=epʷ	*yaɾe
‘to come’	*tɛ(C) (sg), *mɔ̃ŋ (pl)	*wut (cf. also *acʼem ‘to arrive’)	*ətepɨ
‘to kill’	*paT ~ *paK	*aku (?)	*wə
‘foot’	*paɾᵊ	*pɨ / *ⁿpɨ	*pupu
‘to sit’	*ɲɯ̃ p	*in	not reconstructible
‘root’	*ʆaɾet / *yaɾet	*=apo (TG, Mundurukú)	*mitɨ
‘horn’	*kop	not reconstructible	*ɾe(me)tɨ (N)
‘to fly’	*pɔ, *ʆɔ (W)	not reconstructible	not reconstructible
‘to hear’	*ⁿbak	*=eⁿtup	*əta
‘skin,bark’	*kɤ	*pe	*pi
‘long’	*ɾɯy	*peɾeC (?)	*mɨa
‘meat’	*ɲĩt	*ẽt	*punu
‘road’	*pɾɯt	*pe / *ape	*ətema
‘to know’	*ⁿbak	not reconstructible	*pu
‘egg’	*ⁿgɾɛ(C)	*=upiʔa	*pumo
‘seed’	*ʆɯm	not reconstructible	*epɨ (N)
‘knee’	*ʆVkɾã(ỹ) / *yVkɾã(ỹ)	*=pɨ̃ʔã (?)	*=ətyə=kumu (cf. Arara =pia=gumi / =pya=gumi)
‘head’	*kɾãỹ	*ʔa	*pu (N)
‘to sleep’	*ʆɔ̃tᵊ / *ɲɔ̃tᵊ	*kʸet	*wənɨkɨ
‘to burn’	*pokᵊ	*pɨkʼ	*iatu
‘to bite’	*pɾop ~ *pɾʌp	*čukʼu	*əte(ka)
‘fat’	*tɔbⁿ	*kʸap	*katɨ
‘man’	*ⁿbɯn	*aɨče	*wəkɨɾɨ (N)
‘all’	*=pV (?)	not reconstructible, cf. PTG *=pap ‘completive’	not reconstructible
‘snake’	*kaŋã	*ⁿboy	*əkəyu
‘to see’	*ⁿbVp (?)	*cup	*əne
‘heavy’	*kuʆɯ(C)	*pocɨy	*əwoti-
‘to go’	*tɛ(C) (sg), *mɔ̃ŋ (pl)	*co	*tə
‘cold’	*yiyi(C) (W)	*cik ~ *čik	*komiti
‘cloud’	*ⁿgVkᵊ (E) (?), *ⁿbVV (W)	not reconstructible	not reconstructible
‘far’	*ɾɯy	not reconstructible	*mɨa (N), *paki (S)
‘good’	*ⁿbɛȶᵊ (E)	not reconstructible	*kuɾe
‘mountain’	*kɾãỹ	*cuʔa ~ *čuʔa	*(w)ɨpɨ
‘wind’	*kokᵊ	*ɨpʷɨtu	*apitetune
‘belly’	*tikᵊ (E)	*=ɨʔe ~ *=eʔo (?)	*waku (N)

=== Nikulin (2019) ===
Jê-Tupí-Cariban basic vocabulary listed by Nikulin (2019):

- ‘to go’: p-Tupian *to, p-Bororo *tu, p-Cariban *[wɨ]tə[mə]
- ‘arm’: p-Mundurukú *paʔ, p-Macro-Jê *paC, Chiquitano pa-, p-Kariri *bo(ro-), p-Cariban *apə-rɨ
- ‘foot’: p-Tupian *py, p-Macro-Jê *pVrV, p-Bororo *bure, Kariri *bɨ(ri-), (?) Chiquitano pope-, (?) p-Cariban *pupu-ru
- ‘seed’: p-Tuparí-Karitiana *j-upa, p-Cariban *əpɨ (*-tɨpə)
- ‘stone’: p-Macro-Jê *kra(C), p-Kariri *kro
- ‘tree’: p-Bororo *i, p-Kariri *dzi
- ‘to sleep’: p-Jabutí *nũtã, Chiquitano a-nu, p-Bororo *unutu / *-nutu, p-Kariri *-unu, (?) p-Macro-Jê *ũtᵊ

=== Nikulin (2023) ===
Nikulin (2023) identifies the following cognates in Macro-Jê and Tupian as further evidence for a Macro-Jê–Tupian family.

Good distribution in both families
Gloss	Proto-Macro-Jê	Proto-Tupian
3rd person non-coreferential prefix	*i- / *c-	*i- / *c-
‘meat, flesh’	*ĩt / *-ñĩt	*ẽT / *-jẽT
‘to stand’	*ja (nonfinite *-ja-m)	*-ja or *-ʔãP
‘name’	*-jet	*-jeT
‘father’	*-jo₂m	*-joP
‘pus’	*-jo₂w°	*-joP ‘fish roe, pus’
‘tooth’	*-juñ°	*-jãC
‘to ingest’ (‘to eat/drink’)	*-ko₂	*-ꝁo
‘tree, tree-like object (leg, horn, bone)’	*(-)ky₁m°	*(-)ꝁɯP
‘liver’	*-mbâ	*-pɨ(-)ʔa / *mbɨ(-)ʔa
‘smoke’	*-ñĩjə̂k	*-jĩːK
‘feces’	*-ñV˜ t°	*-jV˜ T
‘earth’	*ŋgyN°	*ꝁɯC
‘arm’	*-pa ‘arm, branch’	*-pə / *mbə ‘hand, vine-like’, *-pə-ʔa / *mbə-ʔa ‘arm’
‘foot’	*-pâr°	*-pɨ / *mbɨ
‘to burn, to set on fire’	*(-)py₁k° ~ *(-)py₁ŋ°	*-pɯK
3rd person coreferential prefix	*ta-	*tə-
‘to give’	*-ũp	*-õP
‘to go up, to rise’	*-we(C)	*-we(ː)P

Good distribution in Macro-Jê only
Gloss	Proto-Macro-Jê	Tupian
‘hole’	*-kuñ°	Proto-Mundurukuan *-kã̰j
‘ripe’	*-ndêp°	Tuparí -tep
‘to kill’	*-wĩ	Karo -wĩ

Good distribution in Tupian only
Gloss	Proto-Tupian	Macro-Jê
‘bitter’	*-ðəP	Proto-Cerrado *-ndap ‘sour, bitter’
‘to do, to say, to be like this’	*-ꝁe	Proto-Southern Jê *kê / *ke
‘white’	*-ǩɨT	Proto-Cerrado *-kaː
‘husband’	*-mẽT	Proto-Macro-Jê *-mbi₂n (Eastern)
‘I’	*o-	Proto-Cerrado *wa
‘to wake up’	*-paK	Proto-Jabutian *-pa
‘heavy’	*-pətɨC	Maxakalí -ptux
‘to go’, ‘to come’	*-tẽP ‘to exit’, *-ʔatẽP ‘to arrive’	Proto-Macro-Jê *tẽ (nonfinite *-tẽ-m or *-tẽ-n) ‘to go, to come’ (Eastern)
‘to arrive’	*-wɯC ‘to go out, to arrive’	Proto-Cerrado *wôc, nonfinite *-wôc

Limited distribution in both families
Gloss	Macro-Jê	Tupian
‘bat’	Proto-Goyaz *nĵêp	Proto-Tupian *jɯP (Kepkiriwat and Mondé)
‘to dig’	Proto-Macro-Jê *-kut (Eastern only)	Proto-Mundurukuan *-ɟ e-kot
‘to enter’	Proto-Jê *ŋgê₂ (plural only)	Proto-Tupian *-ke ~ *-ǩe (Eastern)
‘to pierce’	Proto-Cerrado *-pôk (sg.), *-japôk (pl.)	Proto-Tupi–Guaranian *-puK
‘son’	Proto-Chiquitano *´-tsay	Proto-Tuparian *-jaʔɨP or Proto-Mawé–Guaranian *-caʔɨT
‘sour’	Proto-Jê *-jôK ‘sour, salty’	Karitiana -syk
‘sweet’	Proto-Macro-Jê *-jə̂ñ (Eastern)	Tuparí -hoy

Non-cognate lookalikes or loans are identified by Nikulin (2023) as:

- ‘flat’: Proto-Mawé–Guaranian *-peːP and Ofayé -ɸiʔ
- ‘to kill’: Ofayé -kə˜jʔ, Proto-Chiquitano *kõˀõj- ‘to kill, to die’, and Awetí -kỹj
- ‘liquid’: Proto-Tupian *ʔɯ / *-j-ɯ and Proto-Jabutian *-y
- ‘louse’: Proto-Macro-Jê *-ŋgy₁n° (Eastern only) and Proto-Core Mondé *giT
- ‘neck’: Proto-Tupian *-woT and Proto-Cerrado *-mbut
- ‘powder, paste’: Proto-Tupian *-jõʔõP and Proto-Jabutian *-nũ
- ‘thorn’: Proto-Macro-Jê *-ñĩn° ~ *-ñĩñ° and Tuparí -ĩ

== Macro-Chaco hypothesis ==
Nikulin (2019) suggests a Macro-Chaco hypothesis linking Jê-Tupí-Cariban (including Karirian and Bororoan) with Mataco-Guaicuruan (possibly including Zamucoan):

- Macro-Chaco
  - Macro-Guaicurú
    - Matacoan
    - Guaicurú
    - (?) Zamuco
  - Jê-Tupí-Cariban
    - Macro-Tupian
      - Tupian
      - Macro-Jê + Chiquitano
    - Macro-Cariban
      - Cariban
      - Karirí
      - Boróro

In addition to likely shared morphology, there are also various possible Macro-Chaco shared basic vocabulary items, listed below.

- ‘tooth’: p-Tupian *j-ãc, p-Tupian *j-uñ, p-Bororo *o, Chiquitano oʔo-, p-Cariban *jə, p-Kariri *dza, p-Guaicurú *-owe
- ‘liquid’: p-Tupian *j-ɯ, Chiquitano uʔu- ‘honey’, p-Matacoan *-ʔi
- ‘name’: p-Tupian *j-et, p-Tupian *-jet, p-Bororo *idʒe, Kariri *dze, p-Matacoan *-ej, p-Zamocoan *i, (?) Chiquitano ɨri-
- ‘blood’: p-Tupian *əɯ, p-Tupian *j-O, p-Matacoan *’woj-, p-Guaicurú *-awot, Ayoreo ijo
- ‘seed’: pre-pMundurukú *j-a, p-Tupian *j-əm, p-Bororo *a, Chiquitano ijo-, p-Chiquitano *a, p-Matacoan *-oʔ, p-Guaicurú -a ‘fruit’

Reconstructed pronominal affixes of the protolanguages of the Macro-Chaco families are given in the following table:

GLOSS	Macro- Tupí	Macro- Jê	Proto- Carib	Mataco- Guaicurú
1st singular	wi-, o-, ɨ- *a-, *sʲe- [TG]	*ʔi-, yo-	*ɨwɨ (ind.) *ʧi- (A)	*y-
2nd singular	*e- (A) *né- [TG](O)	*ʔa-, gʷa-	*m(ɨ)- (A) *a(y)- (O)	*a-
3rd singular	*o- [TG](A) *i-, *ts- [TG](O)	*i-, ɛ-	*kiʧɨ- (A) *k(i)- (O)	*i-
1st plural		*ku-		*qo-
2nd plural	*pe(ye)-	*ka-		*qa-
3rd plural				

In this table the forms marked with (A) refer to ergative/agentive case, and the forms marked with (O) are referred to absolutive/patient/experiencer case.
