= Karo language (Brazil) =

Endangered Tupian language spoken in Brazil

Karo
- Arara, Ramarama
- Ramarama
- Native to: Brazil
- Ethnicity: Arara people
- Native speakers: 210 (2006)
- Language family: Tupian: Ramarama; Karo
- Dialects: Arara; Uruku

Language codes
- ISO 639-3: arr
- Glottolog: karo1305
- ELP: Karo (Brazil)
- Linguasphere: 88-D

Karo, also known as Ramarama, is a Tupian language of Brazil.

Unusually for the indigenous languages of South America in general and Tupian in particular, Ramarama is a fairly analytic language, with limited affixation and a strict SOV word order. However, the language also displays complex processes of morphophonological alternation, segmental allophony, and interaction between segmental and suprasegmental phonology.

== Setting ==
The Arara people speak this language, also formerly known as Arara but had to be changed in the late 1980s so the language could be distinguished from other languages in the Arara branch by similar Brazilian groups. At one point, Ntogapid, Ramarama, Uruku, Urumi and Ytanga were all thought to be sister languages of Karo. After further study, it was determined that they were all the same language that was classified as different languages during various ethnology work in Brazil. The Karo language is spoken in two villages in Brazil; Iterap and Paygap. These villages are located in the Southern region of the Lourdes Stream Indigenous Land in Rondônia, which is in the central west part of Brazil.

Denny Moore's 2006 summary of indigenous language vitality in Brazil documents that there the Arara people have a population of 184, with most of the population speaking the language and a good transmission rate of the language between generations. Although Portuguese is taught as a second language for contact purposes, the native language is still used for many occasions in daily life. Despite the high level of transmission, their low population puts them at risk of extinction.

== History ==
The Arara people did not have contact with outside groups until around the 1940s. Following Euro-Brazilian contact, their culture has suffered tremendously to the point where it has almost disappeared. Some cultural traditions included a corn harvest festival and secluding children until the time they got married. Although their culture has suffered, many traditions such as rites of passages for marriage and naming children have stayed similar. Other traditions have stayed consistent such as their material culture. The Karo people have a deep history of creating many forms of art such as bracelets, baskets, or clay pots. Furthermore, the Karo speakers were known to interact with surrounding peoples in the areas but it was not until the 1940s when they were contacted by the Indian Protection Services (SPI). Settlers brought over new diseases such as pneumonia, measles and the flu which lead to many indigenous people dying in this time period. Luckily, in the 1960s the Arara people regrouped with a nearby people known as the Gavião where they eventually grew in size. By the mid-1980s, the group was able to find their own village and get federal recognition from local groups.

While the Arara people were severely affected by the colonizers who brought many diseases to their people, there is no documentation on conflicts amongst the colonizers. However, there is documentation of conflicts between two groups of Arara. This conflict was between the main group and another group called the “Black Feet” who spoke a different dialect of the language. The groups often got along but there are documentations of conflicts between the two which turned so violent that some lead in death. Moreover, there are no written material on schools for the Karo people. Most people in the village do speak Arara and Portuguese so it is very likely that most of these community members went to schools outside their village.

=== Documentation ===
The earliest documentation of the Karo language was published by German ethnographer Curt Nimuendaju who produced three wordlists from 1925 to 1955, though he referred to the language as Ntogapíd. Several additional wordlists of Karo, listed under different names, were published during the twentieth century as the Karo people came into greater contact with outside groups. These lists were collected by a variety of people for different aims—a few by anthropologists and ethnographers, one commissioned by a Catholic priest and some by members of the Comissão de Linhas Telegráficas Estratégicas de Mato-Grosso ao Amazonas (Commission of Strategic Telegraphic Wires from Mato-Grosso to Amazonas) who aimed to expand the Western borders of Brazil in the mid-twentieth century. In the twenty-first century, two further wordlists have been published, one by Ruth Fonini Monserrat in the year 2000 and the other through a 2004 language documentation project by Nilsen Gabas Jr.

The majority of detailed linguistic descriptions completed on the Karo language was done by Gabas Jr. who wrote his master's thesis on the phonology of Karo before going on to specialize in the language. He published a phonological study in 1989 which covered the segmental and syllabic structures found in Karo as well as the morphophonemic, nasality, accentual, and tonal patterns that emerge. The next year in 1999, Gabas Jr. published his dissertation, a preliminary grammar of Karo which briefly covered the phonetics, phonology and morphology of the language before focusing on the syntax with a detailed explanation of Karo's three grammatical systems. He also has several papers on Karo on specific topics such as evidentials and lexical choice in narratives.

The Endangered Languages Documentation Programme (ELDP) funded a language documentation project coordinated by Gabas Jr. in 2004 for £12,430. Over the course of two years of field work, the project produced a Karo-Portuguese dictionary and amassed 38 videos, 22 audio files and 15 documents displaying a variety of cultural activities including feasts, ceremonies, and collections of common narratives and myths among the Karo people.

Outside of these projects, there has actually been very little to no anthropological data on the Arára people especially around time of contact. The only substantial material published containing a small description of the life of the Arara can be found in anthropological works by French anthropologist Lévi-Strauss.

== Classification ==
The Karo language belongs to the Tupí stock of Brazilian Indigenous languages which includes up to 10 language families—Karo in particular is a member of the Ramaráma family. In 1964 Aryon Dall’Igna Rodrigues published a classification of the Tupí stock that placed four languages within the Ramaráma family: Ramaráma, Urukú, Urumí and Karo. However, in 2000, Gabas Jr released a detailed comparative analysis of the wordlists published in those languages that challenged these assumptions and concluded that the only language in the Ramaráma language family is Karo. It has been proposed that Karo and another Tupí language Puruborá are both part of a singular Ramaráma-Puruborá language family, however this is controversial. A joint 2015 computational study comparing common word lists in all Tupí languages found minimal support for that theory.

== Phonology ==
=== Syllable structure ===
Unlike many Tupian languages, Ramarama allows consonants in the syllable coda, with no restriction of coda consonants compared to onsets. The permissible structures of a monosyllable are therefore V, CV, VC, and CVC. However, only the glottal stop /ʔ/ can occur as a non-word-final coda consonant. Hence the permissible structures of a polysyllabic word is as follows: ...(C)V(ʔ)(C)V(C). Words of more than three syllables are rare.

=== Consonants ===
Ramarama has a fairly small consonant inventory, with a wide range of allophonic variation. Notably, the language lacks any fricatives other than /h/, which itself occurs only infrequently.

		Bilabial	Alveolar	Palatal	Velar	Glottal
Plosive	Voiceless	p	t	c	k	ʔ
Plosive	Voiced	b			g	
Nasal		m	n		ŋ	
Fricative/Trill			r			h
Approximant		w		j ⟨y⟩		

The tap /r/, though not phonetically a stop, is represented as such because it patterns as the voiced equivalent of the stop /t/. This may indicate a historical rhotacism.

==== Allophony ====
The voiced stops /b g/ may be lenited to [β ɣ] in the onset of an unstressed syllable and after a vowel: yaba [ˈyaba ~ ˈyaβa] "species of rodent". The palatal stop /c/ may be lenited to [ç] in all circumstances (free variation).

The voiceless stops /p t c k/ are geminated in the onsets of non-initial stressed syllables: itɨ [iˈtːɨ] "deer". They are unreleased in the coda of a word-final syllable: makap [maˈkːap̚] "peanut".

Nasal stops /m n ŋ/ surface as post-stopped nasals [mᵇ nᵈ ŋᶢ] in the onsets of stressed oral syllables: naʔmi [naʔˈmᵇi] "species of wasp". Conversely, they surface as pre-stopped nasals [ᵇm ᵈn ᶢŋ] in the codas of stressed oral syllables: ken [kɛᵈn] "to sleep".

The approximants /w j/ are nasalized [w̃ ȷ̃] before nasal vowels. The tap /r/ is nasalized [r̃] only between two nasal vowels, when the first vowel is stressed (as in the process of nasal spreading discussed below).

=== Vowels ===
Ramarama has a large vowel inventory, with seven oral and four nasal vowels:

	Front	Central	Back
High	i ĩ	ɨ	u
Mid	e ẽ	ə	o õ
Low		a ã	

The mid oral vowels /e o/ alternate with low-mid [ɛ ɔ]: syllables with high pitch surface with [e o], while unstressed syllables or those with mid pitch surface with [ɛ ɔ]. Such interaction between tone and vowel quality is cross-linguistically rare.

Nasal vowels have a restricted distribution. Nilson Gabas Jr. (1999) writes that "there seems to be just one underlying nasal vowel per word", yet transcribes several examples with more than one nasal vowel that nasal spreading cannot account for (e.g. mãygãra "snake"); this may indicate a nasal spreading rule as yet undescribed, or a freer distribution of nasal vowels than indicated. In any case, nasal vowels also never occur in a penultimate syllable when followed by a voiceless stop in the onset of the final syllable; in other words, sequences of the format /ṼC^{-VOICE}V#/ are disallowed, presumably because such sequences would create a conflict in stress assignment.

==== Nasal spreading ====
Like many languages with phonemic nasal vowels, Ramarama displays nasal spreading (nasalization of otherwise non-nasal segments due to proximity to a nasal segment) in some circumstances.

Obligatory rightward nasal spreading occurs when a stressed penultimate nasal vowel is followed by the consonants /r g/ as the onset of a following oral syllable. The following syllable is thus nasalized, and with it the onset consonants (which become [r̃ ŋ]): cẽrat /ˈcẽrat/ "smooth" surfaces as [ˈcẽr̃ə̃t̚].

An optional inward nasal spreading occurs when an oral vowel occurs between two nasal consonants. The vowel may then be nasalized: anana /anana/ "pineapple" may become [anə̃ˈnᵈa].

=== Stress ===
Stress is not phonemic in Ramarama, and its placement is mostly fixed to the final syllable. However, the following rules can move stress to the penultimate syllable:

1. If the final syllable's onset is one of the voiced consonants /b r g/, stress is shifted to the penult: yogo "eel" surfaces as [ˈjɔgɔ], not *[jɔˈgɔ].
2. Syllables with nasal nuclei, whether beginning with a voiced stop or not, are automatically stressed: ĩya "bird" surfaces as [ˈĩja], while cigã "bone" surfaces as [ciˈgã].
3. Syllables with high pitch, whether beginning with a voiced stop or not, are likewise automatically stressed: wíup "native, non-domesticated" surfaces as [ˈwí.up̚], while yogá "egg" surfaces as [jɔˈgá]

=== Tone ===
Ramarama has a simple system of register pitch accent, in which one syllable per word (the penultimate or final) can be marked by a high pitch. A syllable thus marked is always stressed. Stressed vowels without marked pitch surface phonetically as middle pitch, while unstressed vowels (except those affected by tone spreading) surface as low pitch: parato "armadillo" may be represented phonetically as [pàràˈtːō], while naká "head" may be represented as [nàˈkːá].

Tone spreading occurs when a syllable marked with high or mid pitch occurs in the penultimate syllable and is followed by a voiced segment /b r g w j m n ŋ/ or /Ø/; hence káwan "be fat" surfaces as [káwán], while yaba "species of rodent" surfaces as [ˈjābā]. This process, roughly analogous to the obligatory nasal spreading rule, appears to be the only means by which unstressed syllables can be raised to high or mid pitch.

=== Sandhi ===
In continuous speech Ramarama's small consonant inventory is further reduced, and simultaneously complicated, by complex morphophonological processes of assimilation (sandhi). These processes affect the voiceless stops /p t k/ as follows:

- /p t k/ voice to /b r g/ at word boundaries, before (if in the coda of the preceding word) or after (if in the onset of the following word) a vowel or a glide.
  "the sun rose" cawap wɨy $\rightarrow$ cawab wɨy
  "[an] ugly song" óra pecép $\rightarrow$ óra becép
- /p k/ voice to /b g/ in word-final codas if followed by an unstressed word-initial nasal consonant:
  "[a] bird's head" wakak naká $\rightarrow$ wagag naká
  If followed by a stressed vowel, /k/ still voices but /p/ changes to [h]:
  "one of the leaves" naʔyop nõ $\rightarrow$ naʔyoh nõ
- /p t k/ nasalize to /m n ŋ/ word-initially when preceded by a nasal consonant, and word-finally when followed by a nasal consonant and preceded by a nasal vowel.
  "my white belly" o=kuŋ kɨt $\rightarrow$ okuŋ ŋɨt
  "[a] bee's head" nãp naká $\rightarrow$ nãm naká

== Morphology ==
The morphology of Karo consists of different morphological properties including word classes, affixes, clitics, nominalizations, and compounding. It is a mildly synthetic-fusional language. Word classes contain morphemes such as pronouns, verbs, adjectives, etc. — Karo contains a total of nine word classes. Karo has a class of pronouns which include four different types: personal, possessive, interrogative, and demonstrative. Nouns are their own class in Karo though they are not inflected for number, gender or case. They can be combined with clitics and modified by adjectives. The verb class in the language are typically sentence-final and are distinctly categorized into transitive and intransitive categories. Auxiliary class words are similar to intransitive verbs in English, but with little lexical meaning. In Karo, adjectives are considered an open class, meaning they accepts the addition of any new words, and usually appear following the head noun in a noun phrase. Adverbs, unlike adjectives, typically appear at the end or beginning of a clause and are a closed class though manner adverbials, which derive from adjectives and include numerals, are open class. Postpositions form their own phrases and contribute to the sentence as oblique arguments. Particles in Karo, like with many other languages, are defined negatively because they are defined by not being part of any other word class. In Karo, particles are similar to adverbs but less cohesively defined. Finally, the most complex class in Karo is ideophones. Semantically similar to verbs, and morphologically similar to the particles, ideophones are an open class that are not inflectionally marked.

Affixes form morphological processes. There are three inflectional suffixes exist in Karo: -t the first indicative,-p the second indicative, and -a the gerund suffix. In addition, the language contains only six derivational prefixes, five which have specific functions:

1. ma- the simple causative
2. ta- the comitative causative
3. pe- the impersonal passive
4. to- the reciprocal
5. mã m- the reflexive

The remaining one pe ʔ- is an optative. Karo is also known for its use of clitics, which are affixes by their distribution. Clitics in this language are typically found within larger constituents than words and Karo in fact contains four: plural marker =to ʔ, adverbializer =tem, a set of personal markers and nominalizer ko=. Lastly, compounding in Karo is quite popular and most morpheme compounds consist of noun + adjective, noun + intransitive verb and noun + noun pairs. All of these elements together compile the basic elements of Karo morphology.

=== Pronouns ===
Below are tables listing of the personal and possessive pronouns as well as the personal clitics. Personal pronouns are used in ergative or subject arguments of transitive verbs. The absolutive, or object, pronouns has as separate system of personal clitics which are marked for the argument of intransitive sentences and the patient arguments of transitive sentences. The possessive pronouns are used with alienable nouns.

Free personal pronouns
		Singular	Plural
1st person	exclusive	õn	té
1st person	inclusive	õn	iʔtə
2nd person		ẽn	kaʔto
3rd person		at	tap
3rd person	feminine	ŋa	tap

Possessive pronouns
		Singular	Plural
1st person	exclusive	wat	teʔet
1st person	inclusive	wat	iʔyat
2nd person		et	karowat
3rd person		at	tabat
3rd person	feminine	ŋaat	tabat
3rd person	impersonal	yat=	

referential clitics
		singular	plural
1st person	exclusive	o=	té=
1st person	inclusive	o=	iʔ=
2nd person		e=	karo=
3rd person		aʔ=	tap=
3rd person	feminine	ŋa=	tap=
3rd person	impersonal	i=	

Examples of pronoun use:

nãn ẽn i=top
who 2SG 3IMP=see
'Who/what did you see?’

wat kaʔa
1SG.POSS house
‘My house’

ŋa=wé-t
3SG.FEM=cry-IND1
‘She cried.’

tap=peri-t
3PL=cry-IND1
‘They cried.’

iʔtə tap
1PL.INCL ASSOC
‘ours (things), us’

caropap=tem kaʔto karo=kõna
sad=ADVZ 2PL 2PL=EMPH
‘You (PL) are sad.’

ameko o=top-t
jaguar 1SG=see-IND1
'The jaguar saw me.'

aʔ=ken-t
3SG=sleep-IND1
'He slept.'

==== Interrogative ====
There are the interrogative pronouns:

1. nãn ‘who, what’
2. kɨgomət ‘which’

==== Demonstrative ====
There are the demonstrative pronouns:

1. yét ‘that (close to speaker)’
2. tət ‘that (close to hearer)’
3. yeket ‘that (far from both)’

=== Indicatives ===
The two indicative Karo suffixes, -t, -p have a fine distinction between them. The term ‘indicative’ in the case of Karo is used for lack of a better label and is split into (IND1) -t and (IND2) -p. They have many similarities. Like all the inflectional suffixes, they can only join at the end of verb, auxiliary and copula predicates. In addition, both are used to represent the main statement within a clause. The only difference is the type of statement clauses that they occur in. The first indicative -t is used that are in SOV position. It can appear allomorphically after nasal vowels as /-n/. Conversely, the second indicative -p only appears when one phrase has been moved into focus position. This suffix can appear as /-ap/ after consonants or /-m/ after nasal vowels.

1st indicative	2nd indicative
õn mãygãra wĩ-n təgana peʔ 1SG snake kill-IND1 there LOC ‘I killed the snake there.’	təgana peʔ õn mãygãra wĩ-m there LOC 1SG snake kill-IND2 ‘It was there that I killed the snake.’
at to=wirup ʔo-t cú-tem 3SG 3R=food eat-IND1 big=ADVZ ‘He ate his own food a lot.’	cú=tem at to=wirup ʔo-p big=ADVZ 3SG 3R=food eat-IND2 ‘A lot, he ate his own food.’

=== Nominalization ===
Entire verbs, verb phrases, and clauses in Karo can be transformed into nouns through three manners: the suffix -ap, the particle kanã and the clitic ko=. The suffix -ap takes transitive and intransitive verbs and yield agentive nominals. It is the only form of nominalization in Karo that does not also utilize the non finite indicating gerund suffix -a. These types of verbs can also be turned into place nouns with the particle kanã. This particle can also be used with the absolutive argument form of ‘to like’ to form actions. The nominalizing clitic ko= works in conjunction with the absolutive argument of ‘to perceive’ to transform whole clauses into nouns.

Examples of nominalization:

ʔo-p
{to eat}-NOMZ
‘eater’

o=ker-a kanã
1SG=sleep-GER NOMZ
‘My place to sleep.’

õn aʔ=wĩ-a kanã yaʔti nã-n
1SG 3SG=kill-GER NOMZ like COP-IND1
‘I like to kill it.’

õn amɑan at-a ko=top-t
1SG rain fall-GER NOMZ=see-IND1
‘I saw the rain falling.'

== Syntax ==
Karo generally follows a relatively strict Subject-Object-Verb (SOV) sentence structure, unless one aspect of the sentence is being focused on. It does not mark for case on nouns, but like many Tupi languages, it follows an ergative-absolutive marking system for pronouns. Karo possesses a system made up of five distinct prefixes all with valency affecting properties.

=== Valency ===
Karo has five derivational prefixes that appear on a verb and change the number of arguments in the a sentence constructions. The five prefixes are as follows:

1. ma- the simple causative
2. ta- the comitative causative
3. pe- the impersonal passive
4. to- the reciprocal
5. mãm- the reflexive

With the simple causative, an argument is added. It appears most often with intransitive verbs to indicate an initiator who causes a secondary agent who performs or experiences an action or state.

Examples of the simple causative:

õn amaken
õn aʔ=ma-ket-t
1SG 3SG=CAUS-sleep-IND1
‘I made it/him sleep.’

ŋa omacopɨn
ŋa o=ma-copɨt-t
3SG.FEM 1SG=CAUS-be.fat-IND1
'She made me be fat.'

õn amapəri
õn aʔ=ma-pərəp=t
1SG 3SG=CAUS-empty-IND1
‘I emptied it.’

The comitative causative also occurs mainly with the intransitive but does appear on occasion with transitive verbs. Like the simple causative it indicates an initiator who causes a secondary agent to perform or experience an action or state, but additionally indicates that the initiator is also performing or experiencing that action or state.

Examples of the comitative causative:

wat owã orakət
wat owã o=ta-kə-t
1SG.POSS mother 1SG=COM-walk-IND1
‘My mother made me walk, walking with me.’

õn wat owẽ́ raken
õn wat owẽ́ ta-ket-t
1SG 1SG.POSS baby COM-sleep-IND1
‘I put my baby to sleep, sleeping with it.’

cãn nakəga
cãn ta-kək-a
cat COM-walk-GER
‘Walk the cat!’

The impersonal passive reduces the number of arguments with transitive sentence constructions. It makes the appearance of any agents in the sentence ungrammatical.

Examples of the impersonal passive:

oyãy bemeŋãn
o=yãy pe-meŋã-n
1SG=tooth IPASS-be.dirty.IND1
‘My tooth got dirty.’

cĩm memaʔwaba
cĩm pe-maʔwap-a
meat IPASS-fry-GER
‘The meat got fried.’

abegahmōm nã
aʔ=pe-kahmōm nã-a
3SG=IPASS-be.quiet cop-GER
‘It got quiet/calmed down.’

Another valency-reducing prefix in Karo is the reflexive which can be used in both transitive and intransitive verb constructions. With transitives, the reflexive is preceded by a coreferential personal clinic relating it to the subject clause. However, with intransitives, the reflexive and clitic are attached to the dative marker.

Examples of the reflexive:

õn omãmnoy
õn o=mãm-top-t
1SG 1SG=REFL-see-IND1
‘I saw myself.’

at tomãmwĩn
at to=mãm-wĩ-n
3SG 3R=REFL-kill-IND1
‘He/it killed him/itself.’

owakán omãmkəy
o=waká-n o=mãm-kəy
1SG=be.angry-IND1 1SG=REFL-DAT
‘I am angry at myself.’

Finally, the reciprocal prefix is also considered to be valency-reducing and attaches itself to the root of transitive verbs. Like the reflexive, it is always preceded by a coreferential personal clitic that relates to the subject of the clause.

Examples of the reciprocal:

tap toroyapít
tap to=ro-yapí-t
3PL 3R-REC-kill-IND1
‘They killed each other.’

kaʔto karorocapét ahyə
kaʔto karo=ro-capé-t ahyə
2PL 2PL=REC-beat-IND1 INTERR
‘Did you beat each other?’

== Semantics ==
Tense in Karo is marked analytically. Analytic languages are characterized by unbound morphemes or syntactical constructions. Both past and future tenses are marked by two particles, but future tense also utilizes one auxiliary. These markers are not necessary for the language.

=== Past Tense ===
There are two particles in Karo. In Karo, particles are used in the past tense to refer to an action or state with the present as a point of reference. These two particles are co and kán. Co refers to actions in the recent or simple past while kán is used for actions that happened a long time ago or past events that relate to myths. Below are examples of co and kán used in everyday Karo language.

púŋ wet co
púŋ o=ʔe-t co
shoot 1SG=AUX-IND1 PAST
‘I shot.’

In this example, the verb “to shoot” is simple since it only contains a subject and a simple verb. It indicates that the shooting that has been done was recent. Conversely, the particle kán is used in the far past.

toto obetõ mɨy mãm ŋán
toto obetõ mɫy mãm kán
grandfather 3IMP-tell long.ago X‍ RPAST
‘It was grandfather who told (the story) long ago.’

In this example, this particle is only used when describing incidents in the far past. Unlike kán, co can also be used to indicate future occurrences with reference to the past. Here are a few examples of when the future tense uses co and the auxiliaries kap and yat.

war icɨ ʔara okay co
wat icɨ ʔat-a o=kap-t co
1SG.POSS water bring-GER 1SG=AUX.FUT-IND1 PAST
‘I was going to bring my water.’

iyõm ikap towenaoba co
iyõm i=kap=ap to=penaop-a co
Father 3IMP=AUX.FUT-IND2 3R=dance-GER PAST
‘Dad was going to dance.’

Both of these case indicate events that could have happened in the near future but didn't in the past tense. In Karo, it is possible to find both past markers in the same clause with co usually appearing before kán. For instance:

ōn opit məy mãm co kán
ōn o=pi-t məy mãm co kán
1SG 1SG=perforate-IND1 long X‍ PAST RPAST
‘I took the vaccine long ago.’

Here, the phrase “I took the vaccine” takes the co marker and “long ago” will fall under the kán marker.

=== Future tense ===
The future tense can be expressed using an auxiliary or one of two particles: kap, yat, and iga respectively. The auxiliary kap is used to describe situations in the immediate or proximate future. It is usually present in the indicative mood when /-p/ and /-t/ are present.

When constructing these different particles, clauses are a large indicator of which particle can be used. The auxiliary kap covers main actions or events and exists in separate clauses. Usually kap exhibits behaviour evidence of subjects. “The subject of the future auxiliary is always coreferential with the subject of the associated full verb” (140) Thus, all marked verbs include a coreferential proclitic if the verb is intransitive and is omitted if the verb is transitive.

The first type of construction, the intransitive verb can occur in the gerund form followed by a Noun Phrase + AUXILIARY FUTURE, which receives the indicative mood marking.

tokera [maʔwɨt cú] kay
to=ket-a [maʔwɨt cú] kap-t
3R=sleep-GER [man big] AUX.FUT-IND1
‘The big man is going to sleep.’

Here, to is attached to the verb with kay being attached in the end which indicates the future conjugation. While in the case below when the case is transitive, a proclitic is attached. Proclitics are a word pronounced with little emphasis, so much so that usually they are shortened and added to the next word. Common examples in English are y’all (you all) and t’was (it was). In these cases, the person of the subject of the future auxiliary, is omitted.

(ø) mãygãra wɪ̃a [wat owẽ] kay
(ø) mãygãra wɪ̃-a [wat owẽ] kap-t
(ø) snake kill-GER [1SG.POSS child] AUX.FUT-IND1
‘My son is going to kill a/the snake.’

Furthermore, yat is the second future marker in Karo which primarily focuses on the simple future. Yat typically occurs at the end of a clause since its constructed with the main verb or auxiliary. Here is an example of this in Karo.

ameko cú yaʔwan yat
ameko cú yaʔwat-t yat
jaguar big leave.IND1 FUT
‘The big jaguar will leave.’

Another interesting feature about yat is that it also refers to nouns in noun phrases which is often written as [future N]. A good example is this one mentioned below:

wat kaʔa ʔa yat
wat kaʔa ʔaʔ yat
1SG.POSS house CL.RD FUT
‘My future house’

In addition to noun phrases, yat also present in with the negative particle. Here, the future particle is present before the negative:

ameko cú yaʔwan nyat iʔke
ameko cú yaʔwat-t yat iʔke
jaguar big leave.IND1 FUT NEG
‘The big jaguar will not leave.’

Lastly, iga is the future particle which is used to mark simple future exclusively in negative-interrogative clauses. Unlike yat, iga examples uses the negative taykit. For instance:

taykir at a?toy iga
taykir at a?=top-t iga
NEG 3SG 3SG=see-IND1 FUT
‘Isn't he going to see it/him?’
