= Kuruaya =

Total population
- 159

Regions with significant populations
- Brazil (Pará)

Languages
- Kuruaya, Portuguese

Religion
- traditional tribal religion

The Kuruaya people are an Indigenous people of Brazil. They live along the tributaries of the lower Xingu River in the state of Pará.

Currently there are approximately 159 living in their Indigenous territory, the Kuruaya Indigenous Area.

== Names ==
The Kuruaya are also known as the Caravare, Curuaia, Kuruaia, or Xipaia-Kuruaia people.

== Language ==
The Kuruaya language is part of Munduruku languages, which belong to the Tupian family. The Kuruaya people now speak Portuguese.
