= Maweti–Guarani languages =

Group of Tupian languages

Maweti–Guarani
- Geographic distribution: Brazil
- Linguistic classification: Tupian: Maweti–Guarani
- Proto-language: Proto-Maweti-Guarani
- Subdivisions: Mawé; Aweti–Guarani; Awetí; Tupi–Guarani

Language codes
- Glottolog: mawe1252 Maweti-Guarani

The Maweti–Guarani languages of Brazil form a branch of the Tupian language family. The branch was originally proposed by Aryon Rodrigues (1984).

== Classification ==
- Maweti–Guarani
  - Mawe
  - Aweti–Guarani
    - Aweti
    - Tupi-Guarani

== Proto-language ==
Proto-Maweti–Guarani
- Reconstruction of: Maweti–Guarani languages
- Reconstructed ancestor: Proto-Tupian
- Lower-order reconstructions: Proto-Tupi–Guarani

Reconstruction of Proto-Maweti–Guarani, along with Mawe, Aweti, and Proto-Tupi–Guarani cognates according to Meira and Drude (2015).

gloss	Proto-Maweti–Guarani	notes (Proto-Maweti–Guarani)	Maweti	Aweti	Proto-Tupi–Guarani
3SG	*i-		i-	i-	*i-
about	*ete		ete	ete	*ece
agouti	*akuti		akuri	akuzu Ɂjɨt	*akuti
anu bird	*anjũ, *aniũ		ajũ-nɁi	ajũ	*anũ
armadillo	*tjajtju		sahu	tatu-pep	*tatu
ashamed	(*tĩ)		tĩ	–	*tĩ
at/in	*pe		pe	pe	*pe
ax	*kwɨ		ɨwɨ-hap	kɨ	*jɨ
back	*(Ɂ)ape		ape	Ɂape	*ape
be/live	*eko		eko	eko	eko
beans	*kumana	(? – possible borrowing)	kumanã	kumanaɁĩ	*kumana
big	*wat(o/u)		wato	watu	waču
bitter	*rõp		nop	lop	*rop
black	*kwuun		huun	–	*un
blood	*tjuwɨ(k)		suu	uwɨk	*(r)uwɨ
blow	*pekwu		pehu	petu	*peju
bone	*kaŋ		kaŋ	kaŋ	*kaŋ
branch	*tjakã		jãŋã	akã	*(r)akã
burn	*apɨ		apɨ	apɨ	*apɨ
buriti (palm)	(*m(u/i)riti)	(? – possible borrowing, TG > Mawe)	miriti	–	*muriti
chest	*potiɁa		potiɁa	pozɨɁa	*potiɁa
chief	(*morekwat)	(? possible borrowing)	morekwat	morekwat	–
call	*enõj		h-enoj	ejõj	*enõj
cloud	*(ɨwɨ)tjiŋ		ɨwɨ-hiŋ	ɨwɨ-tiŋ	ɨßa-tiŋ
COM.CAUS	*er(o/e)-		er-, ere-	zo-	ero
come	*ut		(u)ut	ut	*ut
cooked	*kwɨp		wɨp	o-kɨp	*jɨp
corn	*aßati	(? – probable borrowing)	awati	awati	*aßati
curassow	*mɨtiũ(ŋ), *mɨtjũ(ŋ)		mɨjũ	mɨtuŋ	mɨtũ
deer	*(ɨ)tɨɨ		–	tɨ-wapat, ɨtɨɨ	
die (PL)	*pap		pap	pap	*pap
do	*rj(u/o)ŋ, *nj(u/o)ŋ		nuŋ	juŋ	*ruŋ ~ *roŋ ~ *noŋ (Rodrigues & Dietrich 1997), *noŋ (Mello 2000)
door	*oken		oken-ɨpɨ	oten	*oken
earth	(*Ɂɨj)		Ɂɨj	–	*Ɂɨj
eat	*Ɂu		uɁu	Ɂu	*Ɂu
egg	*upiɁa		upiɁa	n-upiɁa	*upiɁa
enter	*ejke		we-eke	ece	*(e)jkje
exit	*tem		wẽẽ-tem	tem	*čem
eye	*et-tja		(e)ha	(e)ta	eča (Rodrigues and Dietrich 1997), eca (Mello 2000)
face	*(e/o)ßa		(e)wa	owa	*oßa
fall	*Ɂat		aɁat	Ɂat	*Ɂat
father	*tjup		sup	up	*(r)up
feed	*poj		poj	poj	*poj
fetid	*riem, *rjem; (*rem)		nem	jem	*nem ~ *rem
field	*ko		ko	ko	*ko
finger (nail)	*p(uɁ)u(j)ã		puɁujã	puã	*pwã
fire	*atia, *atja		arja	aza	*ata
flat	*peep		peep	ɨwɨ-pep	*pep
flea	*tiuŋ, *tjuŋ		juŋ	tuŋ	*tuŋ
flower	*pojtjɨɨt		i-pohɨɨt	Ɂa-potɨt	*potɨt
foot	*pɨ		pɨ	pɨ	*pɨ
fruit	*Ɂa		Ɂa	Ɂa	*Ɂa
grandfather	*am(õ/ũ)(j)		h-amũ	amũj	*amõj
go	*to		to	to	*co
good	*kajtju		kahu	katu	*katu
hair	*tjap		sap	ap	*(r)ap
hammock	*(Ɂ)(i/ɨ)nĩ		Ɂɨni	Ɂinĩ	*inĩ
hand	*po		po	po	*po
head hair	*Ɂatjap	(from *Ɂa ‘head’ + *tjap ‘hair’)	asap	Ɂap	*Ɂap
heavy	*potɨj		potɨj	potɨj	*pocɨj
hot	*tjakup		sakup	akup	*(r)akup
house	*(tj)ok		sok	ok	*(r)ok
hunger	*tjɨɨɁa(t)		sɨɨɁat		tɨɁa-ßot
kill	(*kwuka)		Ɂa-uka		*juka
leaf	*tjop		ɨ-hop	op	*(r)op
lick	*eereep		eereep	ezep	*erep
lip	*tjẽpe		jẽpe	ẽpe	*(r)eme
louse	*ŋɨp		ŋɨp	Ɂakɨp (from earlier *Ɂa ‘head’ + *kɨp ‘louse’)	*kɨp
manioc	*mani		mani	maniɁok	*maniɁok (cf. Aweti, Tupi-Guarani Ɂok ‘tuber’)
man's daughter	*tjakwiɁɨt		sakiɁɨt	atiɁɨt	*(r)ajɨt
man's sister	*(i/e)nɨt		inɨt	jĩt	*enɨt
man's older brother	*(Ɂ)ɨkeɁɨt		ɁɨkeɁet	ɨtiɁɨt	*ɁɨkeɁɨt
many	*(e)tia, *(e)tja		=-rja	=-za	*eta
medicine	*pot-tjaŋ		pohaŋ	potaŋ	*pocaŋ
moon	*kwaatɨ		waatɨ	tatɨ	*jačɨ
mortar	*(wẽ)kuɁa		wẽkuɁa	ɁẽkuɁa	*ɨŋuɁa
mosquito	*kwatiɁũ		watiɁũ	tazɨɁũ	*jatiɁũ
mother	*tɨ		tɨ	tɨ	*čɨ
neck	*kwut		hut-Ɂɨp [huɁɾɨp]	tur-Ɂɨp [tuɁɾɨp]	*jut
name	*tjet		set	et	*(r)et
navel	*pɨrupɁã		pɨrumɁa	pilup	pɨruɁã (Rodrigues; Dietrich, 1997), pɨruã (Mello, 2000)
OBJ.NZ	*mi-		mi-	mi-	*mipa
in	*tjatɨ		satɨ	atɨ	*(r)ačɨ
pass	*kotjap		kosap	kwap	*kwap
place	*etiam, *etjam		ejam	tam, etam	*etam
pull	*ekɨj		ekɨj	ekɨj	*ekɨj
rain	*ama(a)n		iɁ-ama(a)n	aman	*aman
red	*kwup		hup	tup	*jup
red	(*pɨraŋ)		–	pɨlaŋ	pɨraŋ (perhaps reconstructible only to Proto-Aweti-Guarani)
RFL	*kwe-		we-	te-	*je
root	*tjapo		sapo	apo	*(r)apo
saliva	(*tjẽtɨ)		jẽtɨ-hɨ	–	*(r)enɨ
salt	*kwukɨt		ukɨt	tukɨt	*jukɨt
search	*(i/e)kaat		(i)kaat	(j)kat	*ekat
see/hear	*ẽtup		wan-ẽtup	(ẽ)tup	*enup
seed	*tjaɁĩj		jaɁĩj	aɁĩj	*(r)aɁĩj
seize	*pɨtɨk		pɨtɨk	pɨtɨk	*pɨtɨk
seize	*(j)aat		aat	–	*(j)at
shoot	(*(Ɂ)ɨßõ)		–	Ɂɨwõ	ɨßõ
shoulder	*tj(a/ã)tiɁɨp(i)		jãtiɁɨpɨ	azɨɁɨp	*(r)atɨɁɨp
skin/body	*piit		piit	pit	*pit
slap	(*petek)		petek	–	petek
sleep	*ket		ket	tet	*kjet
smoke	*tjiŋ		ɨ-hiŋ (probably *Ɂɨp ‘tree, wood’ + *tjiŋ)	tiŋ	*tiŋ
snake	*mõj		moj	mõj	*moj
squirrel	(*kutiere, *kutjere)		kutiere	kuceze-Ɂjɨt	–
sweet	*i-tjeɁẽ		heɁẽ	teɁẽ	*čeɁẽ (apparently a lexicalized third-person form)
swim	*ɨjtja(p)		ɨha	ɨta-tap	*ɨtap
termite	*ŋupi		ŋupi-Ɂa	kupi-Ɂa, kupi-Ɂĩ	kupi-Ɂi
tail	*tjuwaj		suwaj-po	uwaj	*(r)uwaj
thick	*anam		iɁ-anam	Ɂajam	*anam
thigh	*Ɂup		Ɂup	Ɂup	*Ɂup
tooth	*tjãj		jãj	ãj	*(r)ãj
tortoise	*kwaßoti		wawori	tawozɨ	*jaßoti
toucan	*tiukan, *tjukan		jũkan	tukan	*tukan
traíra (fish)	(*taraɁɨra)	(? – possible borrowing, TG > Mawe)	taraɁɨra	–	taraɁɨr-a
two	(*mokõj)		–	mokõj	*mokõj
village	(*taaßa)	(? – possible borrowing, TG > Mawe)	taawa	–	*taßa
vulture	*urußu		uruwu	uzuwu	*urußu
wasp	*ŋap		ŋap	kap	*kap
water	*Ɂɨ		ɨɁɨ	Ɂɨ	*Ɂɨ
wind	*ɨßɨt(u)	(? – possible borrowing, TG > Mawe)	ɨwɨtu	ɨwɨt	*ɨßɨtu
woman's son	*mẽpɨt		mẽpɨt	mẽpɨt	*memɨt

For a list of Proto-Maweti-Guarani reconstructions by Corrêa-da-Silva (2013), see the corresponding Portuguese article.
