= Wayampipukú dialect =

Tupian language of Brazil

Wayampipukú
- Amapari Wajãpi
- Native to: Brazil
- Language family: Tupi: Tupi-Guaraní; Northern; Wayampi; Wayampipukú

Language codes
- ISO 639-3: –
- Glottolog: waja1261
- Linguasphere: 88-AAA-bb

Wayampipukú (Amapari Wajãpi) is a dialect of Wayampi, a Tupian language, more specifically, a Northern Tupi–Guarani language.
