= KYZ =

KYZ may refer to:

- Kayabi language, Brazil, ISO 639-3 code
- Kyzyl Airport, Russia, IATA code
- KYZ relay, used for electricity metering
