= XIY =

XIY or xiy may refer to:

- XIY, the IATA code for Xi'an Xianyang International Airport, Shaanxi, China
- xiy, the ISO 639-3 code for Xipaya language, Brazil
