= Karitiana =

Indigenous people of Brazil

Total population
- 320 (2005)

Regions with significant populations
- Brazil (Rondônia)

Languages
- Karitiana

The Karitiana or Caritiana are an Indigenous people of Brazil, whose reservation is located in the western Amazon. They count 320 members, and the leader of their tribal association is Renato Caritiana. They subsist by farming, fishing and hunting, and have almost no contact with the outside world. Their tongue, the Karitiâna language, is an Arikém language of Brazil.

Studies of population genetics often use the Karitiana as a reference population for Native Americans, using DNA samples made available through the Human Genome Diversity Project and other sources. DNA from Karitiana individuals was collected in 1987 by Francis Black and in 2007 it was reported that this sampling was undertaken unbeknownst to FUNAI, the Brazilian agency that regulates contact between the indigenous tribes and the outside world, and that the samples were being distributed for a fee with no benefit to the Karitiana, giving rise to claims of biopiracy. The same newspaper report claimed that further samples were taken in 1996 by Dr. Hilton Pereira da Silva, a doctor on a documentary film crew, on the promise of medicinal supplies that were never fulfilled. A response from Dr. Silva suggests that the news story was faulty and the medicinal samples he took were never used for any commercial purpose.

== Origins ==
A 2015 genetic study found that Karitiana people share partial genetic links with Australasians compared with other Native Americans.

A study by Iosif Lazaridis (2014) found Karitiana to carry Mal'ta MA1 (41%) admixture while the other geneflow in Karitiana appears to have an Eastern Eurasian origin. A study by Kanazawa-Kiriyama et al. (2017) detected gene flow from Karitiana to Mal'ta MA1 (21%) which is in the reverse direction of what was reported in previous studies such as Raghavan et al. 2014 who used a much larger sequence data. The authors speculate that the inverse flow could be due to Ancient Beringian migration in a westward migration into Eurasia.
