= Mawé people =

Indigenous people of Brazil

Mawé
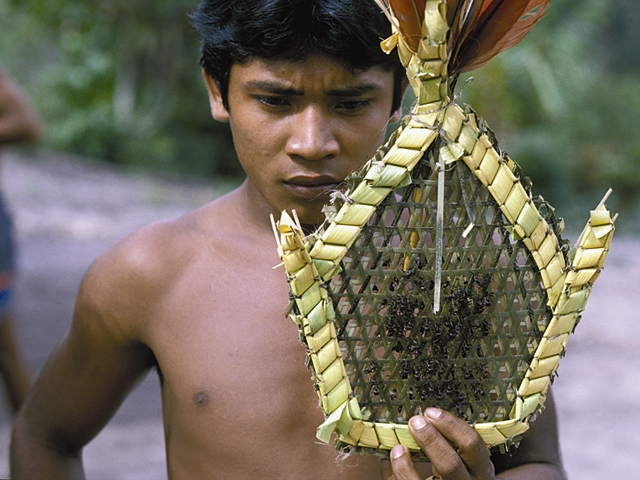
- A young Sateré-Mawé man during a Tucandeira ritual

Total population
- 16312 (Siasi/Sesai, 2020)

Regions with significant populations
- Brazil (Amazonas)

Languages
- Sateré-Mawé, Portuguese

Religion
- Animism Christianity

The Mawé, also known as the Sateré or Sateré-Mawé, are an Indigenous people of Brazil living in the state of Amazonas. They have an estimated population of about 16,312 (Siasi/Sesai, 2020). The Sateré-Mawé were the first to domesticate and cultivate guaraná, a popular stimulant.

== Name ==
The name "Sateré-Mawé" comes from Sateré, meaning "caterpillar of fire", and Mawé, meaning "intelligent and curious Parrot".

They are also called Maué, Mawé, Mabue, Maragua, Sataré, Andira, Arapium.

== Language ==
The Mawé speak the Sateré-Mawé language, which belongs to the Tupian family. A grammar book was developed for the language in 1986.

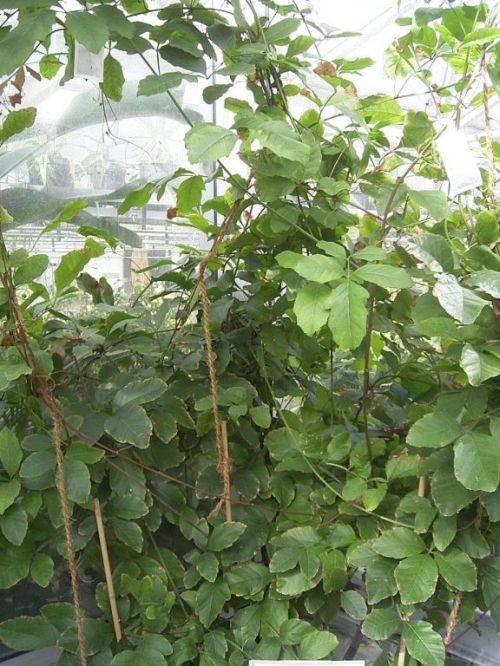
Guaraná (Paullinia cupana), which the Sateré-Mawé are known for domesticating

== Initiation rites ==
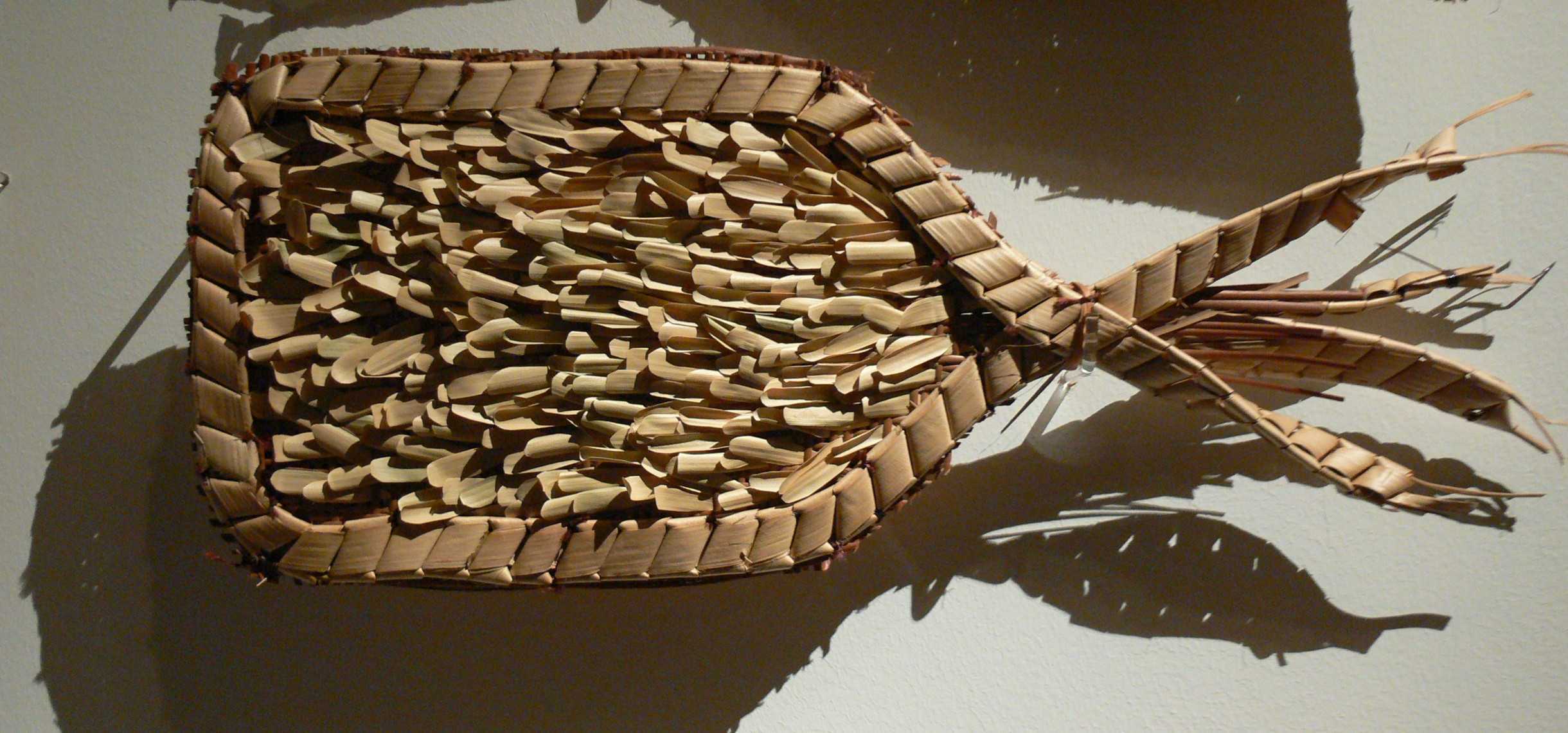
Glove made of palm leaves, used in initiation rites on display at the Museum of Ethnology in Vienna

The Sateré-Mawé people intentionally use bullet ant stings as part of their initiation rites to become a warrior. The ants are gathered from their homes by the men of the community, while the women and children gather cashew leaves. The ants are first rendered unconscious by submerging them in a natural sedative and then hundreds of them are woven into a glove made out of the cashew leaves (which resembles a large oven mitt), stinger facing inward. When the ants regain consciousness, a young male initiate slips the glove onto his hand. The goal of this initiation rite is to keep the glove on for a full ten minutes. When finished, the boy's hand and part of his arm are temporarily paralyzed due to the ant venom. In addition to suffering severely extreme and intense pain, he may hallucinate and shake uncontrollably for days. The only "protection" provided is a coating of charcoal on the hands, supposedly to confuse the ants and inhibit their stinging. To fully complete the initiation, however, the boys must go through the ordeal a total of 20 times over the course of several months or sometimes even years.
