= Proto-Tupian language =

Reconstructed ancestor of the Tupian languages

Proto-Tupian
- PT
- Reconstruction of: Tupian languages
- Region: Madeira River basin?
- Era: ca. 3000 BCE
- Lower-order reconstructions: Proto-Tupari; Proto-Maweti–Guarani

Proto-Tupian (PT) is the reconstructed common ancestor of all the Tupian languages. It consists, therefore, of a hypothetical language, reconstructed by the comparative method from data of the descendant languages.

In Brazil, Tupian historical-comparative studies are being developed mainly by two scientific teams: one from the Laboratório de Línguas Indígenas (LALI) of the University of Brasília, under the coordination of Aryon Rodrigues; and the other one from the Museu Paraense Emílio Goeldi, located in Belém, under the orientation of Denny Moore. These studies provide evidence about the Proto-Tupian economy and culture, suggesting, for example, that they had agriculture.

The most accepted theory is that the Tupian language family originated between the Guaporé and Aripuanã rivers, in the Madeira River basin. There are currently 70 Tupian languages, including Tupi, Paraguayan Guarani, Awetï, Ayvu, etc.

== Linguistic homeland ==
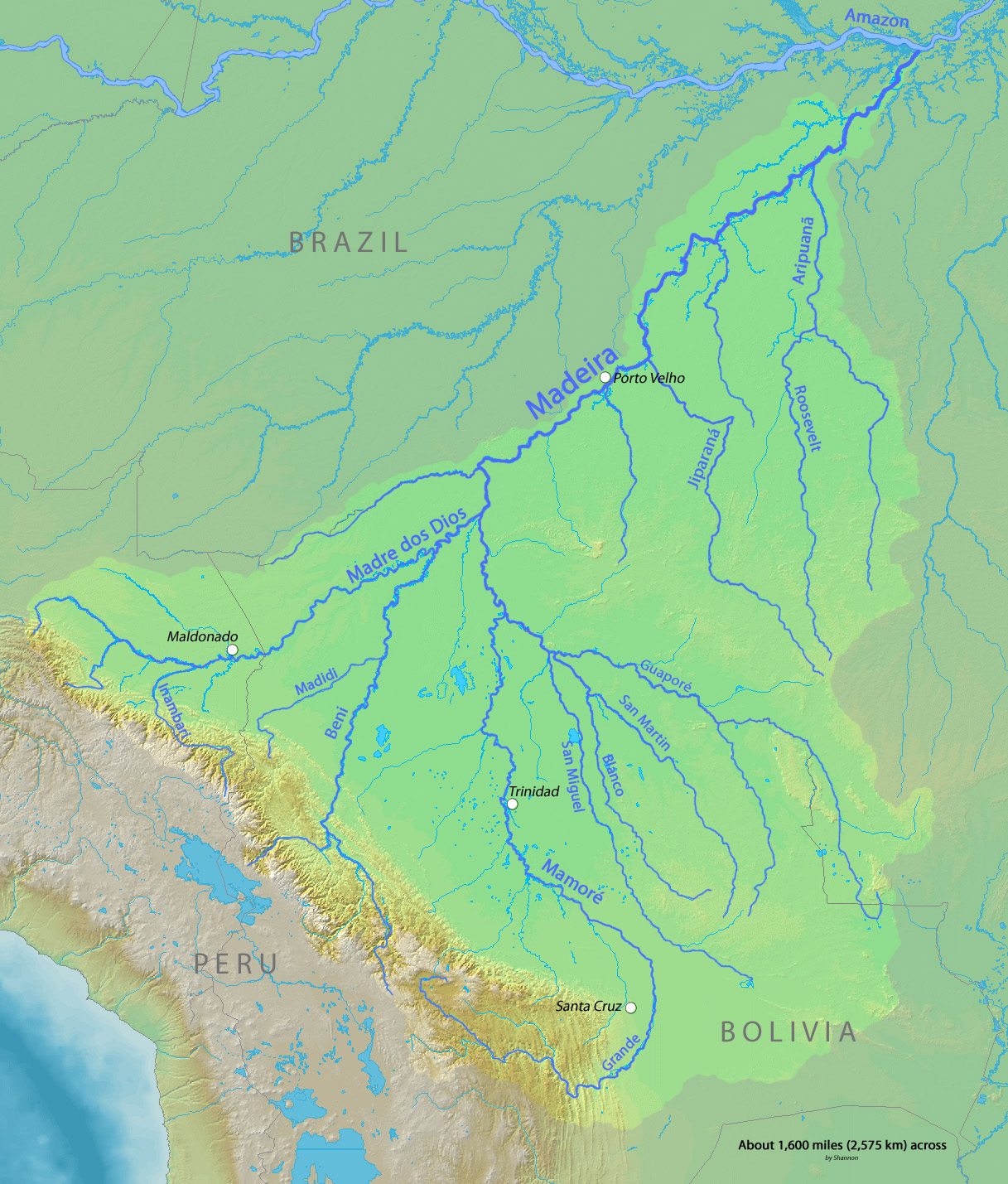
Madeira River watershed; Guaporé river is in the east.

Rodrigues (2007) considers the Proto-Tupian linguistic homeland to be somewhere between the Guaporé and Aripuanã rivers, in the Madeira River basin. Much of this area corresponds to the modern-day state of Rondônia, Brazil. Five of the ten Tupian branches are found in this area, as well as some Tupi–Guarani languages (especially Kagwahiva), making it the probable linguistic homeland of these languages and maybe of the peoples that traditionally speak them. Rodrigues believes that Proto-Tupian dates back to around 5000 BP.

O'Hagan (2014) proposes that Proto-Tupi-Guarani was spoken in the region of the lower Tocantins and Xingu Rivers. Proto-Omagua-Kokama then expanded up the Amazon River, Proto-Tupinamba expanded south along the Atlantic coast, and the Southern branch expanded up along the Tocantins/Araguaia River towards the Paraná River basin.

== Phonology ==
Proto-Tupian is reconstructed with the following phonology:

=== Consonants ===
	Labial		Coronal		Dorsal			Glottal
	plain	labial	plain	pal.	pal.	plain	labial	Glottal
Nasal	*m		*n			*ŋ	*ŋʷ	
Plosive	*p *b	*pʷ	*t	*tʲ	*kʲ	*k	*kʷ	*ʔ
Affricate			*ts	*tʃ				
Liquid			*ɾ	*ɾʲ	*j		*w	

=== Vowels ===
Rodrigues (2005)
	Front		Central		Back	
	oral	nasal	oral	nasal	oral	nasal
Close	*i	*ĩ	*ɨ	*ɨ̃	*u	*ũ
Mid	*e	*ẽ			*o	*õ
Open			*a	*ã		

Nikulin & Carvalho (2022)
	Front		Central		Back	
	oral	nasal	oral	nasal	oral	nasal
Close	*i	*ĩ	*ɨ	*ɨ̃	*ɯ	*ɯ̃
Mid	*e	*ẽ	*ə	*ə̃	*o	*õ
Open			*a	*ã		

== Lexicon ==
This section lists Proto-Tupían reconstructions from Rodrigues and Cabral (2012). Since the reconstructions are highly tentative, the Proto-Tupían forms are all marked by two asterisks.

For a list of Proto-Tupian reconstructions by Nikulin (2020), see the corresponding Portuguese article.

=== Independent nouns ===
Proto-Tupian independent nouns:

Human beings

- **apʷũ ‘person’/‘who’
- **aɨče ‘man’
- **pet ‘woman’
- **orʲe ‘we, I; he/they’
- **ru ‘fellow’

Animals

- **ɨčɨ ‘deer’
- **ameko ‘jaguar’
- **aʔɨ ‘sloth’
- **awuru/aworo ‘parrot’
- **arat ‘macaw’
- **moj ‘snake’
- **ɨp ‘fish’
- **enem ‘beetle’
- **ŋap ‘wasp’

Plants

- **mani ‘manioc’
- **awa/awai ‘yams’
- **ɨčɨpo ‘vine’
- **kʔɨp ‘tree, wood’
- **kɨče ‘bamboo’
- **ɨʔa ‘calabash’
- **wetʲɨk ‘sweet potato’

Nature

- **ŋʷat ‘sun’
- **watɨ ‘moon’
- **ɨpʷɨ ‘earth’
- **aman ‘rain’
- **ičʔɨ ‘river’
- **wita ‘stone’
- **ʔat ‘day’

=== Dependent nouns ===
Proto-Tupian dependent nouns:

Kinship

- **amõj ‘grandfather’
- **up ‘father’
- **čɨ ‘mother’
- **aʔɨt ‘son of a man’
- **ɨket ‘older sister of a woman’
- **kɨpʷɨt ‘brother of a woman’

Parts of the body of animals

- **po ‘hand’
- **ʔa ‘head’
- **ap ‘hair’
- **apɨ ‘ear’
- **pepʔo ‘wing’
- **uwaj ‘tail’
- **kaŋ ‘bone’

Parts of plants

- **epʷ ‘leaf’
- **akã ‘branch’
- **potʔɨt ‘flower’
- **wu ‘thorn’

Artifacts

- **ekʷʔɨp ‘arrow’
- **wɨ ‘ax’
- **ɨrʲu ‘basket’
- **waʔẽ ‘pot’
- **čʔam ‘rope’
- **atʲa ‘fire’
- **ekʷ ‘house’
- **moʔɨt ‘necklace’

Sensations, feelings, and attributes

- **ačɨ ‘ache’
- **akʲup ‘warm’
- **ečaraj ‘forgetful’
- **pocɨj ‘heavy’
- **acʔaŋ ‘thick’

=== Verbs, affixes, and others ===
Proto-Tupian verbs, affixes, and other parts of speech:

Positional verbs

- **ʔam ‘to stand’
- **up ~ wup ‘to lie’
- **in ‘to sit’
- **eko ‘to be moving’
- **kup ‘to be plural’

Motion / directional verbs

- **ka ‘to go’
- **co ‘to go’
- **ut ~ **wut ‘to come’

Dicendi / faciendi verb

- **kʔe ‘to say/to do’

Postpositions

- **pe ‘punctual locative/dative’
- **ka ‘allative’
- **wo ~ mo ‘diffuse locative’
- **ece ‘relative’/‘associative’
- **eɾi, **wi ‘ablative’
- **eɾʲo ~ **eɾʲe ‘associative’
- **coče ‘superessive’
- **na ‘translative’

Derivational valence changing prefixes

- **mo- ‘causative prefix’
- **eɾʲo- ~ **eɾʲe- ‘causative-comitative prefix’
- **we- ‘reflexive prefix’
- **wo- ‘reciprocal prefix’

=== Cultural vocabulary ===
Proto-Tupían cultural vocabulary (Rodrigues and Cabral 2012):

Proto-Tupian	Gloss
**up	'father'
**čɨ	'mother'
**čɨʔɨt	'mother's sister'
**amõj	'grandfather'
**aʔɨt	'man's son'
**memɨt	'woman's child'
**men	'husband'
**atʔɨ	'wife'
**ike	'man's older brother'
**kɨpʔɨʔɨt	'man's younger brother'
**kɨpwɨt	'woman's brother'
**wamu(ã)	'shaman'
**ekw	'house'
**ekwen	'door'
**tʔap	'thatch'
**upap	'lying place'
**eɾĩ	'hammock'
**acoʔi	'to cover'
**ekwat	'village patio'
**ŋo ~ ŋe	'cultivated field'
**čɨt	'digging stick'
**mani	'manioc'
**awa(i)	'yams (Dioscorea sp.)'
**wetjɨk	'sweet potato'
**kuɾua	'pumpkin'
**pe	'tobacco'
**ɾjuku	'achiote (Bixa orellana)'
**ɨʔa	'calabash'
**ekwʔɨp	'arrow'
**wekeʔa	'fish trap'
**wɨ	'ax'
**ɨɾju	'basket'
**čʔam	'rope'
**waʔẽ	'ceramic pot'
**čɨt	'to bake'
**wɨp	'to bake, to cook'
**mõj	'to cook'
**eʔe	'to grate'
**čekw	'to pound'

== See also ==
- Apapocuva
- Indigenous languages of the Americas
- Languages of Brazil
- Lingua Geral
- List of Spanish words of Indigenous American Indian origin

== Bibliography ==
- Campbell, Lyle (2000). American Indian Languages: The Historical Linguistics of Native America. Oxford University Press. pp. 199, 201. ISBN 978-0-19-534983-2.
- Gildea, Spike (1998). On Reconstructing Grammar: Comparative Cariban Morphosyntax. Oxford University Press. pp. 5, 53, 86, 88. doi:10.1093/oso/9780195109528.001.0001. ISBN 978-0-19-510952-8.
- van Gijn, Rik; Hammond, Jeremy (15 October 2016). Switch Reference 2.0. Typological Studies in Language. John Benjamins Publishing Company. pp. 15–16. doi:10.1075/tsl.114. ISBN 978-90-272-6677-4.
- Nikulin, Andrey; Carvalho, Fernando (2022). "A revised reconstruction of the Proto-Tupian vowel system". Boletim do Museu Paraense Emílio Goeldi. Ciências Humanas. 17 (2): e20210035. doi:10.1590/2178-2547-bgoeldi-2021-0035. ISSN 2178-2547.
- Nikulin, Andrey (2020). Proto-Macro-Jê: um estudo reconstrutivo (Doctoral dissertation). University of Brasília. hdl:10482/38893.
- O'Hagan, Zachary; Keith Bartolomei; Natalia Chousou-Polydouri; Emily Clem; Erin Donnelly; Lev Michael (October 20, 2014). A Computational-phylogenetic Classification of Tupí-Guaraní and its Geographical Spread (PDF). Language Variation and Change. Chicago.
- Rodrigues, Aryon Dall'Igna (2007). "As consoantes do Proto-Tupí". In Cabral, Ana Suelly Arruda Câmara; Rodrigues, Aryon Dall'Igna (eds.). Línguas e culturas Tupí. Vol. 1. Campinas: Curt Nimuendajú. pp. 167–203.
- Rodrigues, Aryon Dall'Igna (2005). "As vogais orais do Proto-Tupí". In Rodrigues, Aryon Dall'Igna; Cabral, Ana Suelly Arruda Câmara (eds.). Novos estudos sobre línguas indígenas. Brasília: Editora UnB. pp. 35–46.
- Rodrigues, Aryon Dall'Igna; Cabral, Ana Suelly Arruda Câmara (2012). "Tupían". In Grondona, Verónica; Campbell, Lyle (eds.). The Indigenous Languages of South America. The World of Linguistics. Vol. 2. Berlin: De Gruyter Mouton. pp. 495–574. doi:10.1515/9783110258035.495. ISBN 9783110255133.
- Rodrigues, Aryon Dall'Igna; Cabral, Ana Suelly Arruda Câmara (2006). "Investigando a origem e o desenvolvimento de orações dependentes nas famílias do tronco lingüístico Tupi" (PDF). Revista da Abralin. 5 (1–2). ISSN 2178-7603. Archived from the original (PDF) on 2016-03-03.
