= Munduruku language =

Tupian language of north-central Brazil

Munduruku
- Native to: Brazil
- Region: Tapajós river basin
- Ethnicity: 10,100 Munduruku (2002)
- Native speakers: 7,500 (2006)
- Language family: Tupian: Munduruku; Munduruku

Language codes
- ISO 639-3: myu
- Glottolog: mund1330
- ELP: Mundurukú
- Linguasphere: 88-CAA-a

Munduruku is a Tupi language spoken by 10,000 people in the Tapajós River basin in north central Brazil.

Gomes points out that Munduruku is one of the languages of the Tupian family and constitutes, together with Kuruaya, the Munduruku linguistic branch [...] The Portuguese language has made significant inroads among the Munduruku but most of the women and children are monolingual. Some loss of the Munduruku language is occurring among those who live in the area of the Madeira River and on the outskirts of the towns next to the Tapajós River; however the situation is not as bad as it seems, as even here the language of the majority is Munduruku and bilingualism arises only after Munduruku has already been acquired (around 10 years of age), usually as a result of learning Portuguese at school.

Those who live in the villages of the Tapajós River valley speak only Munduruku, even in the presence of non-indigenous people. There are elementary schools in almost all villages, and courses promoted by the Brazilian government have turned over education to the Mundurukú, who are starting to take control of their own formal education.

== Phonology ==
=== Phonemes ===
Consonants
| | | Bilabial | Alveolar | Palatal | Velar | Glottal |
|---|---|---|---|---|---|---|
| Nasal | | m | n | | ŋ | |
| Plosive/ Affricate | voiceless | p | t | tʃ | k | ʔ |
| Plosive/ Affricate | voiced | b | d | dʒ | | |
| Fricative | | | s | ʃ | | h |
| Approximant | | w | | j | | |
| Tap | | | ɾ | | | |

Modal vowels
| | Front | | Central | | Back | |
| | oral | nasal | oral | nasal | oral | nasal |
|---|---|---|---|---|---|---|
| Close | i | ĩ | | | | |
| Mid | ɛ | ɛ̃ | ə | ə̃ | o | õ |
| Open | | | a | ã | | |

Creaky vowels
| | Front | | Central | | Back | |
| | oral | nasal | oral | nasal | oral | nasal |
|---|---|---|---|---|---|---|
| Close | ḭ | ḭ̃ | | | | |
| Mid | ɛ̰ | ɛ̰̃ | ə̰ | ə̰̃ | o̰ | õ̰ |
| Open | | | a̰ | ã̰ | | |

Mundurukú makes a contrast between creaky and modal voice on vowels. Some minimal pairs are provided below.

- /wḭda̰/ 'jaguar' vs. /wida/ 'kind of clay'
- /ipa̰ɾa̰ɾa̰/ 's/he is sunburned' vs. /ipaɾaɾa/ 's/he is afraid/scared'

=== Phonotactics ===
The syllable in Munduruku is made up of an obligatory vocalic nucleus and one of four phonemic accents (three of pitch and one of laryngealization). It may also have an onset or coda. No consonant clusters are permitted. Thus, the permissible syllables are CV, CVC, V, and VC (with V being the most rare).

The onset in this language may be any one of the 16 consonant phonemes which contrast as to the manner and point of articulation: (1) voiceless stops /p, t, k, tʃ, k, ʔ/; (2) voiced stops /b, d dʒ/; (3) fricatives /s, ʃ, h/; (4) nasals /m, n, ŋ/; and (5) sonorants /w, j, r/.

The only segment not allowed in the coda is /tʃ/. CVj and CVw segments, and not CV.V ones, are considered CVC syllables for a variety of reasons; one is that it would require positing a new syllable pattern limited to CVu and CVi with no other vowels occurring in coda position. There is also a phonetic contrast between /i, u/ as vowel nuclei and /j, w/ as codas, the former being distinctly vocalic and the latter consonantal.

The syllabic nucleus is limited to only one vowel.

=== Tone ===
Tone is considered a feature of the entire syllable rather than of the nucleus only. One tone occurs with each syllable. Note that the functional load of tone is light—only some 40 lexical pairs with contrastive tones have been found, and few grammatical contrasts are marked by tone alone.

Mundurukú tone has many surface realizations; phonemically, there is a contrast between High and Low, illustrated by the minimal pairs below:

| Example | Tone | Gloss | Example | Tone | Gloss |
|---|---|---|---|---|---|
| /é/ | H | 'path' | /è/ | L | 'tobacco' |
| /wə̃́j/ | H | 'port' | /wə̃̀j/ | L | 'far' |
| /íhí/ | HH | 'winter' | /íhì/ | HL | 'monkey, sp.' |
| /òʔát/ | LH | 's/he fell' | /òʔàt/ | LL | 'I fell' |
| /ádʒódʒót/ | HHH | 'grandparent' | /àdʒòdʒòt/ | LLL | 'we (incl.) came' |

Creaky vowels do not contrast in tone in Munduruku: they always have low tone.

== Syntax ==
Munduruku is an OV language.

== Vocabulary ==
=== Numerals ===
Munduruku lacks words for numbers above 5.

== Bibliography ==
- Braun, Ilse; Crofts, Marjorie (1965). "Mundurukú Phonology". Anthropological Linguistics. 7 (7): 23–39. ISSN 0003-5483. JSTOR 30013071.
- Crofts, Marjorie (1973). Gramática mundurukú. Série Lingüística (in Portuguese). Vol. 2. Brasília: Summer Institute of Linguistics. hdl:11858/00-001M-0000-0012-962B-D.
- Crofts, Marjorie (1985). Aspectos da língua mundurukú (in Portuguese). Brasília, DF: Summer Institute of Linguistics. LCCN 85227429. OCLC 13331351.
- Gomes, Dioney Moreira (2006). Estudo morfológico e sintático da língua mundurukú (tupí) [Morphological and Syntactic Study of the Mundurukú Language (Tupí)] (Doctoral thesis) (in Portuguese). Universidade de Brasília. hdl:11858/00-001M-0000-0012-67FD-1.
- Lewis, M. Paul; Simons, Gary F.; Fennig, Charles D., eds. (2015). Ethnologue: Languages of the World (18th ed.). Dallas, Texas: SIL International. ISBN 978-1-55671-391-0.
- Picanço, Gessiane Lobato (2005). Mundurukú: Phonetics, phonology, synchrony, diachrony (PhD thesis). Vancouver: University of British Columbia. doi:10.14288/1.0092991.
- Picanço, Gessiane Lobato (2010). "A Reconstruction of Nasal Harmony in Proto-Mundurukú (Tupi)". International Journal of American Linguistics. 76 (4): 411–438. doi:10.1086/656313. ISSN 0020-7071. JSTOR 10.1086/656313.
- Pica, Pierre; Lemer, Cathy; Izard, Véronique; Dehaene, Stanislas (2004-10-15). "Exact and Approximate Arithmetic in an Amazonian Indigene Group" (PDF). Science. 306 (5695): 499–503. Bibcode:2004Sci...306..499P. doi:10.1126/science.1102085. ISSN 0036-8075. PMID 15486303.
- Strömer, Chrysostomus (1932). Die Sprache der Mundurukú: Wörterbuch, Grammatik und Texte eines Indianeridioms am Oberen Tapajoz, Amazonasgebiet. Anthropos Linguistische Bibliothek (in German). Vol. 11. St. Gabriel: Anthropos. ISBN 978-3-86290-064-0.
- Mendes Junior, Djalma Gomes (2007). Comparação fonológica do Kuruáya com o Mundurukú (in Portuguese).
- Martines, George Vergés (2007). Aspectos semânticos dos nomes clasificadores em Munduruku (in Portuguese).
