= Manitsauá language =

Extinct Tupian language of Brazil

Manitsawá
- Mantizula
- Native to: Brazil
- Region: Mato Grosso
- Extinct: early 20th century
- Language family: Tupian: Yuruna; Manitsawá

Language codes
- ISO 639-3: msp
- Glottolog: mari1442
- Linguasphere: 88-JAB-aa

Manitsawá (Mantizula) is an extinct Tupian language of the state of Mato Grosso, in the Amazon region of Brazil.

== Vocabulary ==
Manitsauá vocabulary
Manitsauá	English
amatá	breast
diadia	black
hat(i)	fire
hayadi	sun
huabiá	penis
huati	vagina, vulva
huibiá	scrotum
madigaú	moon
nuamatá	nipple
