= Yuruna languages =

Tupian language branch of Brazil

Yuruna
- Jurúna
- Geographic distribution: Xingu River and tributatires, Brazil
- Linguistic classification: Tupian: Yuruna
- Subdivisions: Yuruna; Xipaya; Maritsauá †

Language codes
- Glottolog: yuru1262

The Yuruna languages (or Jurúna languages) of Brazil form a branch of the Tupian language family.

They are Jurúna, Maritsauá, and Xipaya.
