= Karitiâna language =

Tupian language spoken in Brazil

Karitiâna
- Caritiana, Yjxa
- Native to: Brazil
- Region: Rondônia
- Ethnicity: Karitiâna
- Native speakers: 210 (2006)
- Language family: Tupian: Arikem; Karitiâna

Language codes
- ISO 639-3: ktn
- Glottolog: kari1311
- ELP: Karitiana
- Linguasphere: 88-FAA-aa

Karitiana, otherwise known as Caritiana or Yjxa, is a Tupian language spoken in the State of Rondônia, Brazil, by 210 out of 320 Karitiana people, or 400 according to Cláudio Karitiana, in the Karitiana reserve 95 kilometres south of Porto Velho. The language belongs to the Arikém language family from the Tupi stock. It is the only surviving language in the family after the other two members, Kabixiâna and Arikém, became extinct.

== History ==
Although the first Western contacts with the Karitiana people are believed to have begun in the 17th century, the first recorded contact dates to 1907 when a survey conducted by Cândido Rondon indicated that they were already working for Bolivian rubber tappers. Systematic contact between the Karitiana people and Caucasians, nevertheless began in the 1950s with the intervention of ISA and Roman Catholic Salesian missionaries. As a result of the missionaries' visit, a list of words and phrases were compiled, allowing Professor Aryon Rodrigues, who was working at the University of Campinas at the time, to classify the language as a member of the Arikém family by comparing the language to existing materials on the Arikém language.

Many of the Karitiana people are bilingual in Karitiana and Portuguese, and despite the population growth in recent years and the language's high level of transmission, the language is listed as vulnerable by UNESCO due to the low number of speakers and the proximity to the city of Porto Velho. A literacy project in the 1990s resulted in 24 students being made literate, and written documentation of the culture, as well as audio recordings were created. As of 2005, indigenous teachers have been holding lessons in the villages. However, the literacy project ended in 1997 due to a lack of permanent funding.

== Documentation ==
Some of the earliest works on the language date to the 1970s by missionary David Landin, who spent time in the Karitiana village between 1972 and 1977, through a partnership between FUNAI (Fundação Nacional do Índio) and SIL International (Summer Institute of Linguistics) (Landin, 2005). He has mainly studied syntax (1984), but has also compiled lexicon that has resulted in the creation of a Karitiana dictionary (2005). Another early researcher is Gloria Kindell, also from the SIL, who has analyzed phonological and syntactic aspects of Karitiana (1981).

The first substantial grammar of Karitiana, however, was published by Luciana Storto (1999), describing topics on the phonology, morphology and syntax, and since then she has published a number of papers on Karitana syntax (2003, 2008, 2012, 2013, 2014). Subsequently, a number of studies on the language has continued to be published, covering a wide array of topics. Ana Müller, for example has published papers on Karitiana semantics (2006, 2009, 2010, 2012). Ivan Rocha da Silva has produced a variety of works on Karitiana syntax (Rocha 2014), including two extensive descriptions on syntactical topics (2011, 2016). Ethnographically, Felipe Ferreira Vander Velden has documented a number of social aspects of the Karitiana people, specifically researching about the relations between indigenous peoples and animals. He has published a book about domestic animals among the Kartitiana (2012).

== Phonology ==
=== Vowels ===
	Front	Central	Back
High	i ĩ	ɨ ɨ̃	
Mid	e ẽ		o õ
Low		a ã	

Karitiana vowels can be distinguished by the features [high], [back], and [round], and can be short or long, oral or nasal.

=== Consonants ===
	Bilabial	Coronal	Palatal	Velar	Glottal
Nasal	m	n	ɲ	ŋ	
Plosive	p	t		k	
Fricative		s			h
Rhotic		ɾ			
Semivowel			j	w	

Karitiana also possesses [tʃ] and [ʔ] but, according to Luciana Storto (1999), the occurrence of [ʔ] is predictable, and [tʃ] is extremely rare, though it occurs in Karitiana's personal pronouns.

The nasals /m n ɲ/ are pre-oralized [ᵇm ᵈn ᶡɲ] if they are preceded by an oral vowel, and post-oralized [mᵇ nᵈ ɲᶡ] if they are followed by one. The velar nasal /ŋ/ is denasalized to [ɡ] before oral vowels in unstressed syllables, post-oralized to [ŋᶢ] before oral vowels in stressed syllables, and pre-oralized [ᶢŋ] after oral vowels. /h r j w/ are nasalized [h̃ r̃ w̃ ȷ̃] when surrounded by nasal vowels.

== Morphology ==
Everett lists six word classes for Karitiana. In general, Karitiana follows the general trend in Tupi languages of presenting little dependent-marking or nominal morphology, though it has a robust system of agglutinative verbal affixes. Valence-related verbal prefixes occur closer to the verb root than other prefixes and, according to Everett, the most crucial valency distinction in Karitiana is the distinction between semantically monovalent and polyvalent verbs as this plays an important role in verbal inflections and clausal constructions, such as the formation of imperative, interrogative and negative clauses, as well as in the establishment of grammatical relations. Karitiana displays a binary future/non-future tense suffix system and a number of aspect suffixes. It also possesses desiderative inflection, an optional evidentiality suffix, a verb-focus system among other constructions. Karitiana possesses a nominalizing suffix that is attached to verbs in order to derive nouns. In general, nouns serving as core arguments for a verb are left unmarked for case, but non-core arguments can receive allative and oblique case markers.

=== Pronouns ===
There are free pronouns and pronominal prefixes, the latter of which serves to cross-reference the absolutive nominal of a given clause, and also functions as possessors when attached to nouns.

Karitiana has no pronoun distinction is made between male vs. female (as "he" or "she" in English).

The third person pronoun i is the only free pronoun that can be used to express possession.

Personal pronouns
		Free pronouns		Pronominal prefixes	
		Singular	Plural	Singular	Plural
1st person	Exclusive	ɨ̃	ɨta	ɨ-	ɨta-
1st person	Inclusive	ɨ̃	ɨːtʃa	ɨ-	ɨj-
2nd person		ãn	aːtʃa	a-	aj-
3rd person		i	–	ø-	–

Examples of free pronouns and pronominal prefixes:

ɨ-ɲõŋõ
1S.GEN-arm
My arm

ɨj-hadni-pa
1P.GEN-speak-NOM
Our cellphone

a-soːjt
2S.GEN-wife
Your wife

i soːjt
3S.GEN wife
His wife

==== Demonstratives ====
Karitiana has at least six demonstrative pronouns.

Demonstrative	Meaning
ka	refers to manner
ho	proximal
onɨ̃	distal
ɲã	refers to things that are close and seated
hɨp	refers to things that are close and supine
hoːɾi	refers to things that are out of sight

mõɾ̃ãmõn ka
WH+ DEM.MAN
What is this? (something in hand)

mõɾ̃ãmõn ho
WH+ DEM.PROX
What is that? (something close)

mõɾ̃ãmõn onɨ̃
WH+ DEM.PROX
What is that (over there)

hoɾi naka-atɨka-t pikom ep okɨp
DEM.ONSEEN NSAP-be.t-NFUT wooly.monkey tree.on
There is a woolly monkey in some tree over there (Not sure which tree.)

=== Causativization ===
Karitiana expresses causation by the prefix m- or the periphrastic tɨpõŋ, inferring that one participant is causing another to act in a certain manner. The prefix m- is used to add an argument to intransitive verbs, and tɨpõŋ is used to add a third argument to a transitive verb, and the former agent receives the oblique suffix -tɨ.

ɨ̃n i-pɨtʔɨ-t
1S INT-eat-NFUT
I ate

ɨ̃n na-m-pɨtɨ-t i-tɨ
1S NSAP-CAUS-eat-NFUT 3-OBL
I fed him'/'I gave him food

ɨ̃n a-taka-mĩː-t tɨpõŋ i-tɨ
1S 2S.ABS-SAP-hit-NFUT cause(?) 3-OBL
I made you hit him

=== Nominalization ===
The suffix -pa can be attached to non-finite verbs, in general, resulting in a noun that is related to the given verb. The meaning of the resulting noun is quite flexible and it varies according to the context. For example:

taɾɨka + -pa $\rightarrow$ taɾɨkipa
walk {} NOM {} {'thing related to walking/going'}

In certain contexts taɾɨkipa can be used to refer to canoe, car, airplane, as well as a friend's house that one frequently visits, or make-up and nice clothing, as these are associated, for some Karitiana, to going out in the city.

Verbs associated with -pa can also be preceded by a noun in order to reduce the scope of the -pa nominal:

mɨhõɾõn + -pa $\rightarrow$ mɨhõɾõnpa
clean {} NOM {} {'thing related to cleaning'}

mɨhõɾõn + -pa $\rightarrow$ mɨhõɾõnpa
clean {} NOM {} {'thing related to cleaning'}

osop + mɨhõɾõn + -pa $\rightarrow$ {osop mɨhõɾõnpa}
hair {} clean {} NOM {} {'thing related to cleaning'}

In some cases, -pa can also be attached to nouns to derive other nouns. For instance, when attached to nouns representing animals, the result is the animal's habitat or a trail used by it.

== Syntax ==
=== Case and agreement ===
Karitiana displays an ergative pattern of agreement, where an intransitive verb agrees with its subject, and a transitive verb agrees with its direct object, as is shown in examples 1a) to 1f) below. This pattern surfaces in all matrix clauses and is evident from person agreement morphology on verbs, and is true for both declarative and non-declarative sentences.

Yn a-ta-oky-j an
1S 2S-DECL-kill/hurt-IRR 2S
'I will hurt you'

An y-ta-oky-t yn
2S 1S-DECL-kill/hurt-NFUT 1S
'You will hurt me'

Yjxa ø-na-ahee-t iso
1P 3-DECL-blow-NFUT fire
'We-INCL blew fire'

Y-ta-opiso-t yn
1S-DECL-listen-NFUT 1S
'I listened'

A-ta-opiso-t an
2S-DECL-listen-NFUT 2S
'You listened'

Aj-taka-tar-i ajxa
2P-DECL-leave-IRR 2P
'You-PL will leave'

ø-Naka-hỹrỹja-t i/taso
3-DECL-sing-NFUT 2S/man
'He/the man sang'

An exception is the object focus construction, where the transitive verb exceptionally agrees with the ergative argument as shown in examples 2a and 2b. This construction does not involve intransitivization; this exceptional agreement is a product of object focus morphology.

'Ep aj-ti-pasagngã-t ajxa
trees 2PL-OFC-count-NFUT 2PL
'Trees, you-PL are counting'

Sepa y-ti-m-'a ty-j̃a-t
basket 1PS-OFC-CAUS-do IPFV.sitting-NFUT
'A basket, I am weaving'

According to Everett many phenomena in Karitiana follow a nominative pattern generally due to the pragmatic status of arguments. He argues that the grammatical relations of Karitiana suggest a system where syntactic phenomena often tend to display nominative-accusative patterns, and morphological phenomena tend to display ergative-absolutive patterns.

== Semantics ==
=== Quantification ===
Noun phrases (NPs) in Karitiana surface as bare nouns, without any functional operator, such as inflection to mark number or definiteness. Bare nouns can refer to one or more entities, definite or indefinite, and these are determined by the context in which they occur.

Maria akam'at gooj
Maria naka-m-'a-t gooj
Maria DECL-CAUS-make-NFUT canoe
‘Maria built the/a/some canoe(s)’

Taso naka'yt boroja
taso naka-'y-t boroja
man DECL-eat-NFUT snake
‘A/the some man/men ate a/the/some snake(s)’

Karitiana does not require numeral classifiers, thus numerals receive the oblique suffix -t and are directly linked to common nouns. The numeral system consists of units from 1 to 5, and larger numbers are expressed with a combination of these units.

Yn naka'yt myhint pikom
yn naka-'y-t myhin-t pikom
1S DECL-eat-NFUT one-OBL monkey
‘I ate one monkey’

Yn naka'yt sypomp pikom
yn naka-'y-t sypom+t pikom
1S DECL-eat-NFUT two-OBL monkey
‘I ate two monkeys’

Karitiana makes a lexical distinction between mass and count nouns. Count nouns can be counted directly, while mass nouns require a system of measurement.

* Myhint ouro naakat i'orot
{} myhin-t ouro na-aka-t i-'ot-<o>t
{} three gold DECL-AUX-NFUT PART-fall-REDUP-NFUT
‘Three golds fell’

Myhint kilot ouro naakat i'orot
myhin-t kilo-t ouro na-aka-t i-'ot-<o>t
three kilogram-OBL gold DECL-AUX-NFUT PART-fall-REDUP-NFUT
‘One kilogram of gold fell’

* J̃onso nakaot sypomp ese
{} j̃onso naka-ot-Ø sypom+t ese
{} woman DECL-bring-NFUT two-OBL water
‘The woman brought two waters’

J̃onso nakaot sypomp bytypip ese
j̃onso naka-ot-Ø sypom+t byt-ypip ese
woman DECL-bring-NFUT two-OBL bowl-in water
‘The woman brought two bowls of water’

Quantifying expressions can behave like adverbs or nouns. The word si'ĩrimat is used to mean nobody or never, and the word kandat is used to express quantification of nouns and verbs.

Isemboko padni si'ĩrimat eremby
i-semboko padni si'ĩrimat eremby
3-get.wet NEG ever hammock
‘Hammocks never get wet’

Iaokooto padni si'ĩrimat y'it
i-a-okooto padni si'ĩrimat y-'it
3-PASS-bite NEG ever 1S-son
‘Nobody bit my son’ (lit. My son was never bitten)

Kandat nakahori dibm taso
kandat naka-hot-i dibm taso
a.lot DECL-go-FUT tomorrow man
‘Many men will go tomorrow’ (lit. Men will go a lot tomorrow)

Pyrykiidn j̃onso pytim'adn kandat tyym
pyry-kiid-n j̃onso pytim'adn kandat tyym
assert-exist-NFUT woman work a.lot SUB
‘There are many women that work a lot’

Universal quantification is conveyed by the expression (ta)akatyym, where -ta is a third person anaphora, aka is the verb to be, and tyym is the SUBordinate particle. This expression roughly means those who are. Anaphoric ta is used when the quantifying expression is not adjacent to the noun it modifies, and is not necessary when it is adjacent to the noun.

Taakatyym naponpon João sojxaaty kyn
ta-aka-tyym na-pon-pon-Ø João sojxaaty kyn
3ANAPH-be-SUB DECL-shoot-REDUP-NFUT João wild.boar at
‘João shot at every wild boar’ (lit. João shot at wild boar that be)

Taakatyym naponpon taso sojxaaty kyn
ta-aka-tyym na-pon-pon-Ø taso sojxaaty kyn
3ANAPH-be-SUB DECL-shoot-REDUP-NFUT taso wild.boar at
‘All the men shot at the boar’ (lit. Men that be shot at wild boar)

Sojxaaty akatyym naponpon João
sojxaaty aka-tyym na-pon-pon-Ø João
wild.boar be-SUB DECL-shot-REDUP-NFUT João
‘João shot at all the wild boars’ (lit. João shot at the wild boars that are)
