= Ramarama languages =

Family of languages

Ramarama
- Geographic distribution: Rondônia, Brazil
- Linguistic classification: Tupian: Purubora–Ramarama; Ramarama
- Subdivisions: Karo; Urumi

Language codes
- Glottolog: rama1257
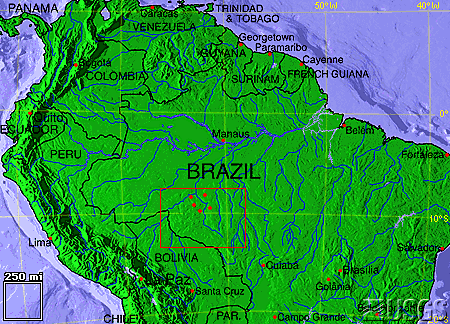
- The Ramarama languages (box)

The Ramarama languages of Rondônia, Brazil form a branch of the Tupian language family. They are Karo, or Ramarama, with 150 speakers, and the extinct Urumi.
