= Kayabí =

Indigenous people of Brazil

Total population
- 1,855 (2010)

Regions with significant populations
- Brazil (Mato Grosso)

Languages
- Kayabí

Religion
- traditional tribal religion

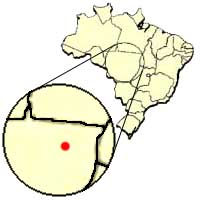
one location where the Kaiabi reside in Brazil

The Kayabí or Kaiabi are an Indigenous people of Brazil inhabiting the northern state of Mato Grosso. They primarily live in the Xingu Indigenous Park and the Indian Reservation of Apiaká-Kayabi south of Pará. There are approximately 1300 Kayabí living on the Xingu Indigenous Park. They are known by a number of names; Caiabi, Parua, Maquiri, Kawaiwete and many more romanizations of the word Kaiabi.

Though residing on a reservation with 14 other Indigenous groups, the Kayabi still remained very much heterogeneous. They maintained their traditional way of life, and practiced their customs unchanged for centuries. It was this longing for the preservation of culture and life that mandated the Kayabi left their native lands and seek shelter and protection. During colonial times Indigenous peoples had their villages disseminated, raided and even destroyed if located on resource rich lands. Many men were killed and women forced into slavery during these acts of ethnocide. Countless fell ill to diseases the Europeans brought with them, for example smallpox, measles, chicken pox, tuberculosis, yellow fever, and other forms of the flu virus.

== Name ==
They are known by a number of names; Caiabi, Parua, Maquiri, Kawaiwete and many more romanizations of the word Kaiabi.

== History ==
The Kaiabi people along with other Indigenous peoples occupied large areas within Brazil. In relatively self-reliant villages all along the coast of Brazil and mouth of the amazon, these people thrived as fisherman, hunters and farmers. The ever-increasing presence of Europeans systematically caused a cultural hemorrhage of the Kaiabi People.

In 1961 after centuries of forced contact and inhumane treatment at the hands of European settlers and companies, an area was finally allocated for the Indigenous peoples of Brazil who faced the same grievances as the Kaiabi. An Indigenous reserve comprising about 6.9 million acres of land that today houses about 5,500 inhabitants, including 1,000 Kaiabi, from 17 different clans; Parque Indígena do Xingu.

The Kaiabi People first began moving into Xingu Indigenous Park during the early 1950s. The Kaiabi People faced encroachment of their lands and culture by commercial companies, therefore they fled to the Xingu Indigenous Park. There were three distinct migrations; the first in the 1950s from the upper Teles Pires River area in the state of Mato Grosso, another in 1966 from the Peixes River area (a tributary of the Arinos River), lastly during the 1970s and the early 1990s other Kaiabi families migrated from the State of Pará located down the Teles Pires River.

As mentioned before the Kaiabi began moving to the Park not only to protect their culture but also to evade persecution from rubber tappers, loggers, farmers, miners and other Euro-Brazilians who forced them from their lands, raped their women, or murdered them. Presently, about 200 Kayabi still live in their traditional homelands outside of the Xingu Reserve, these stay only because of the ancestors who are buried on there. The Kaiabi fervently believe that spirits exist even after their bones have turned to dust. They believe that these spirits can be communicated with and sought after for blessings, protection etc. Therefore, as a form of respect some Kaiabi refuse to leave these lands but most importantly the bones of their ancestors.

== Language ==
Their language is the Kayabí Language. It is one of the Tupi-Guarani languages.

== Economy ==
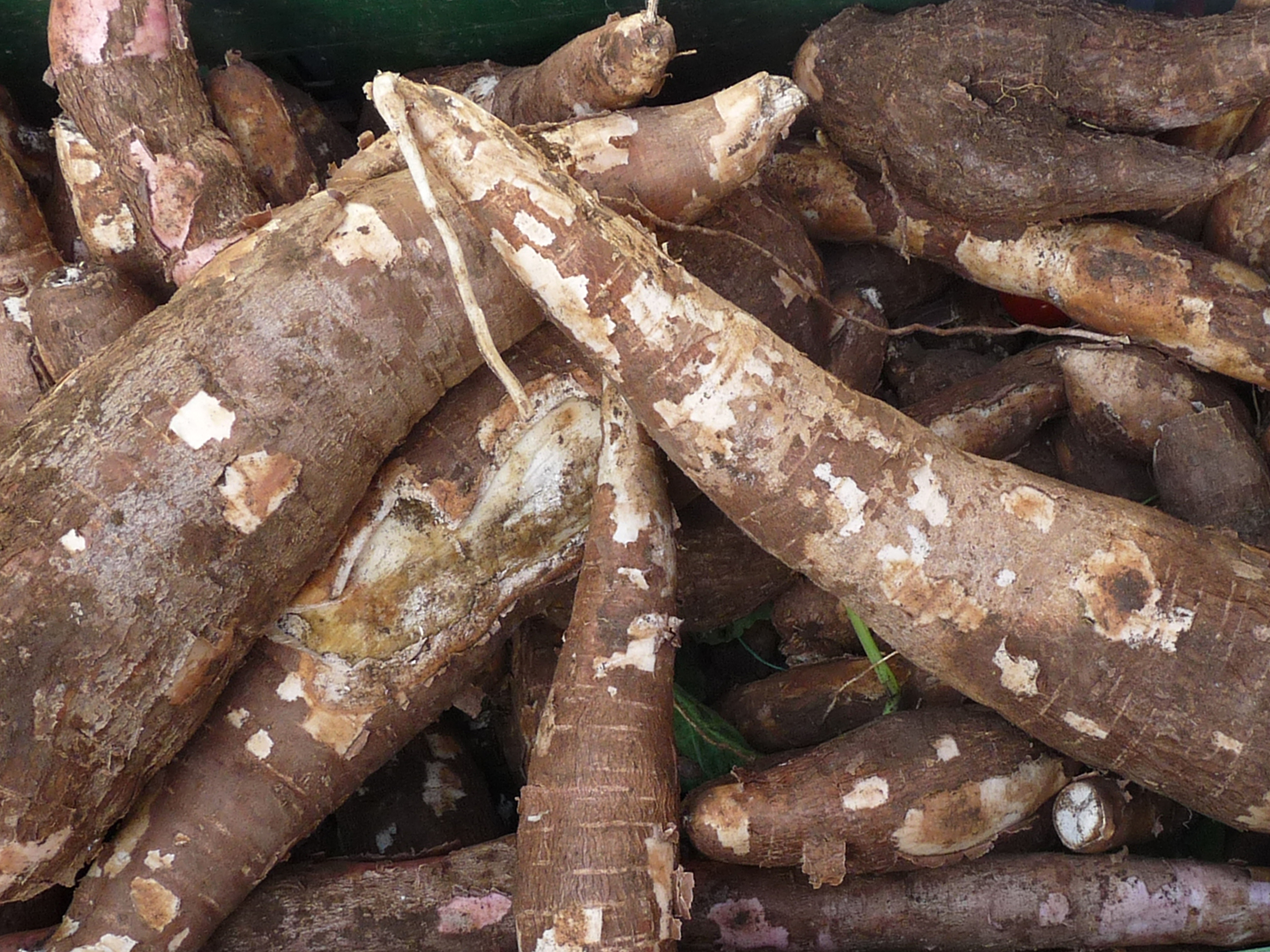
Cassava root; a main staple of the Kaiabi

Land for many cultures is a source of life, wealth and divination. For the Kaiabi people land is the embodiment of all three, to this day the Kaiabi maintains a strong connection to their lands. Though considered a "tradition" peoples their methods of agriculture are quite vast. Their horticulture is extremely diversified, containing dozens of varieties of domesticated plants and a fairly elaborate agricultural system. As a result of their agriculturally based society there are four main seasons throughout the year. They are the cutting down of shrubs and trees (May), clearing of the debris (June), burning of the cleared area (August) and finally planting in September and October. These practices are similar to what we know as slash-and-burn. Harvesting of crops is dependent on the method of cultivation employed.

The Kaiabi people have two basic types of cultivation fields or farms: namely, poly-variety manioc(cassava) fields and poly-cultural fields after the slash-and-burn technique. Planted almost exclusively in the first are the different varieties of manioc used for the production of flour, bread and porridges. Planted in the poly-cultural swiddens are various species demanding better soil types (areas of black earth): maize, cotton, peanut, potato, yam, banana, beans, sugarcane, pumpkin and watermelon and many other staples the Kaiabi depend on.

The dietary practices of the Kaiabi mirror that of their agriculture. Their dishes are organic, natural and diversifies greatly. Even today seafood and wild game are still important staples in their diet. A typical meal would consist of flour from the cassava root, which could be made into bread and ate along with a fish dish. Also juices from the pulp of fruits, corn, peanuts and many other products are consumed.

== Religion ==
Unlike western ideology that time is linear, many Indigenous people believe that time is cyclical. Which in turn connects the people who came before to those still living. However, because the presence of supernatural beings is not felt by every individual, a person who acts as an intermediary between humans and the supernatural world is needed. Within the Kayabi society there are numerous shamans, who fulfills the intercessory role. According to Tori McElroy an online journalist the role of a shaman includes "Going Around In Circles" in his article he states that a shaman understands the concept of The Circle of Life. In other words, we are born, we live and we die; some sooner than others but the process is still the same. Just as the seasons spring, summer, fall and winter represent different times of the harvest, so do they mirror our journey in life. A shaman is tasked with the great responsibility of understanding each stage and giving advise, helping, healing and teaching as needed for the common good of the community. This often means placing the needs of the society first, before your needs or the needs of your family.

It can be said that Shamans are protectors of the traditions that the Kaiabi hold dear. there is no question that Shamans are special and important members of society however they don't exactly participate in the normal everyday life activities of the community. It is believed that shamans gained the gift of divination through an encounter with a grave sickness, and with this event a link between the supernatural and human worlds is created.

== Culture ==
=== Cosmology ===
According to the Kaiabi the universe is divided up into overlapping segments. It is home to various powerful beings. Some of these beings take on the form of animals called "animal chiefs", the "anyang and mama'e" which according to the Kaiabi have the power to take the souls of humans. In the western point of view this deities are similar to Death. Also there are cultural heroes who are believed to have taught the Kaiabi their way of life. And finally, within the universe there are Gods and shamans of the sky. This cosmological tale is how the Kaiabi believe they came in existence, it is how they see themselves and understand their place within this world.

Every animal, and when they say animal that includes humans, possess an "ai'an" which means the soul. The Kaiabi believe that humans are not given souls at their births, but receive it as they are given their names. The naming process is a very important event in the life of a Kaiabi, their names reflect the community in which they live, one is given a name based on the day that his is born. and whether or not he is the first, second, third etc. child for his parents.

=== Naming Scheme ===
Names and the naming process are significant within the Kaiabi culture. Each Kaiabi individual acquires several names at their birth, and throughout their lifetime. These names represent a range of personal events or accomplishments such as a rise in status or life-altering personal experiences. Names can be taken from ancestors or occurrences within the community (such as market day, the one day of the week, or second day of the week) and many more. The child is responsible for making his or her name known to the rest of the society.

=== Art/Craft ===
The material culture of the Kaiabi people is extremely diverse and intricate. Their most notable self manufactured item is the sieve. There are different types of sieves such as the "apàs" and the basket which is woven and designed by the men of the village. The women engage in hammock and sling making. Which are woven by cotton grown and harvested in their own fields. Presently, the main items of produce are collars made from tucum palm, either smooth or designed with animal inspired figures, also manufactured by women.
