= Kuruaya language =

Moribund Tupian language of Brazil

Kuruáya
- Region: Brazil
- Ethnicity: 130 Kuruaya (2006)
- Native speakers: 1 (2020)
- Language family: Tupian: Munduruku; Kuruáya

Language codes
- ISO 639-3: kyr
- Glottolog: kuru1309
- ELP: Kuruaya
- Linguasphere: 88-CBA-aa

Kuruáya is a nearly extinct Tupian language of the state of Pará, in the Amazon region of Brazil. As of August 2020, there is only one speaker of Kuruáya, Odete Iawa, who is in her eighties or nineties or older.
