= Arikem languages =

Tupian language family of Brazil

Arikem
- Geographic distribution: Brazil
- Linguistic classification: Tupian: Arikem
- Subdivisions: Karitiâna; Arikem †

Language codes
- Glottolog: arik1263

The Arikem languages of Brazil form a branch of the Tupian language family. They are Karitiâna and the extinct Arikem.

== Varieties ==
Below is a list of Arikém language varieties listed by Loukotka (1968), including names of unattested varieties.

- Arikém / Uitáte / Ahôpovo / Ariquemes – spoken on the Ariquemes River and Jamari River, Rondônia.
- Caritiana – spoken on the Candeias River, Rondônia.
