= Kayabi language =

Tupian language spoken in Brazil

Kayabí
- Kawaiwete, Caiabi
- Native to: Brazil
- Region: northern Mato Grosso
- Ethnicity: 1,620 Kayabi (2006)
- Native speakers: 1,000 (2006)
- Language family: Tupian: Tupi–Guaraní; Kawahib; Kayabí

Language codes
- ISO 639-3: kyz
- Glottolog: kaya1329
- ELP: Kawaiwete
- Linguasphere: 88-AAE-a
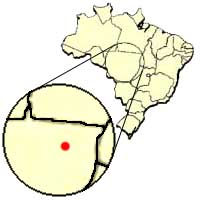
- Distribution of Kayabi in the Xingu Indigenous Park

Kayabí (Caiabi; also Kawaiwete) is a Tupian language spoken by the Kayabí people of Mato Grosso, Brazil. Although the Kayabi call themselves Kagwahiva, their language is not part of the Kagwahiva language.

It is spoken in the Xingu Indigenous Park and Apiaká-Kayabi Indigenous Territory.

== Phonology ==
=== Consonants ===
	Labial	Alveolar	Palatal	Velar	Labio- velar	Glottal
Plosive	p	t		k ɡ	kʷ	ʔ
Nasal	m	n		ŋ		
Fricative	f	s				
Tap		ɾ				
Approximant			j		w	

/f/ can also be heard as a bilabial fricative [ɸ].

=== Vowels ===
	Front	Central	Back
High	i ĩ	ɨ ɨ̃	u ũ
Mid	e ẽ		o õ
Low		a ã	
