= Reciprocal pronoun =

Pronoun that indicates a relationship which is reciprocal

A reciprocal pronoun is a pronoun that indicates a reciprocal relationship. A reciprocal pronoun can be used for one of the participants of a reciprocal construction, i.e. a clause in which two participants are in a mutual relationship. The reciprocal pronouns of English are one another and each other, and they form the category of anaphors along with reflexive pronouns (myself, yourselves, themselves, etc.).

== Defining properties ==
=== Semantics of reciprocal relation ===
Reflexive pronouns are used similarly to reciprocal pronouns in the sense that they typically refer back to the subject of the sentence.

(1) John and Mary like themselves.
(2) John and Mary like each other.

The main difference between reflexives, as in example (1), and reciprocal pronouns, as in example (2), is that reflexives are used when the subject acts upon itself, while reciprocals are used when members of a group perform the same action relative to one another. Reciprocal pronouns exist in many languages. They are associated with plural noun phrases and indicate a reciprocal relationship between the members of the plural noun phrase. This means that some member (x) of the plural subject is acting on another member (y) of the subject, and that member (y) is also acting on (x), and that both x and y are members of the group denoted by the antecedent subject.

Below are examples of reciprocal pronouns and how their relationship to their antecedents contrasts to cases of reflexive pronoun relationships, and regular transitive relationships, and how they behave in relation to direct object pronouns in the same situation. Let R denote a Relation, and let the variables (for example, (x, y) ) stand for the arguments introduced by R.

Logical form	Example	Pronominal form	Referential dependency	Scenario (set of girls, Anne and Betty)
R(x, y)	The girls saw her.	(regular) pronoun	x≠y (x and y are distinct)	A saw someone female, B saw someone female.
R(x, x)	The girls saw themselves (in the mirror).	reflexive pronoun	x=y (x and y are not distinct)	A saw A in the mirror, B saw B in the mirror.
R(x, y) AND (y, x)	The girls saw each other in the mirror.	reciprocal pronoun	R(x,y) AND R(y,x)	A saw B in the mirror, B saw A in the mirror.

Therefore, we can look at a reciprocal relationship using this notation, using the verb see as the relation: see(Anne, Betty) and see(Betty, Anne).

=== Syntax of reciprocals as anaphors ===
Within the theory of generative grammar, and within phrase-structure grammar, binding theory explains how anaphors share a relationship with their referents.

Binding Principle A of this theory states:

1. X binds Y if and only if X c-commands Y, and X and Y are coindexed,
2. Anaphors must be locally bound within the binding domain of the clause containing the DP determiner phrase.

In the traditional binding theory, the category of anaphor includes both reflexive and reciprocal pronouns of English, which is a problem, since they are distributed differently.

The differences in the distribution of reflexives and reciprocals are illustrated below using X-bar theory tree diagrams.

=== Distribution of reciprocals: Lebeaux (1983) ===
Although both reciprocal and reflexive pronouns are classified as anaphors, they differ in distribution. For example, reciprocal pronouns can appear in the subject position of noun phrases, whereas reflexives cannot.

(3) a.  John and Mary like each other's parents. 
    b. *John and Mary like themselves' parents.

(4) a.  All of the students would know if each other had the answers.
    b. *All of the students would know if themselves had the answers.

In example (4b) with the reflexive anaphor, the embedded clause's complementizer phrase (CP) beginning with the word "if", cannot introduce a subject noun phrase.

Although in many cases, either a reflexive or a reciprocal pronoun could appear in the same structural position, in some cases, the asymmetry occurs when a reciprocal may be bound to its antecedent, but a reflexive may not.

The following examples from Lebeaux (1983) show that in some sentences, either type of anaphor could be used:

(5) a. John and Mary like themselves.
    b. John and Mary like each other.

Both the reflexive pronoun in (5a) and the reciprocal pronoun in (5b) can be locally bound (its antecedent is in the same clause, the clause is the binding domain), which would follow binding theory's binding principle A: that an anaphor must be bound in its binding domain). A case in which we can see the differences in the distribution of reflexive and reciprocal pronouns is in the subject position of embedded clauses: reflexives cannot occur in this position (6a), but reciprocals can (6b).

(6) a. *John and Mary think that themselves will win.
    b.  John and Mary think that each other will win.

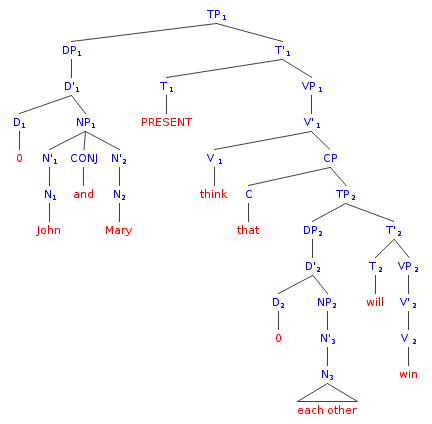
(6b) Syntax tree with reciprocal pronoun

As we can see in the X-bar theory tree diagram of (6b), the reciprocal pronoun is in the subject position of the embedded clause, which is introduced by complementizer "that". It is not possible for a reflexive pronoun to occur in this position as shown by the ungrammaticality of (6a).

In this case, the reciprocal pronoun is not necessarily the ideal construction, but the reflexive is not a possible grammatical sentence. This suggests that while reflexives require a proper binder, reciprocals may appear in positions that are not governed this way, and can even be in a different clause than the antecedent.

The differences can be summarized as follows:

- Reciprocals are subject to binding theory;
- Reflexives are subject to binding theory, and must be properly governed.

== Variation in the realization of reciprocals ==
Syntactically, reciprocals can be realized as free or bound pronouns, as NP arguments or as verbal affixes.

=== Free pronoun ===
==== Person-marked free pronoun ====
These have a similar pattern to personal pronouns, as they are morphemes independent from the verb (and not clitics, or inflection markers). They possess person features: the reciprocal pronoun surfaces differently when its antecedent is first-, second- or third-person. These are common in the Chadic language Hausa:

mun tsallàkē jūnan-mù
1PL.AUX jumped RECIP-1PL
'We jumped over one another.' (Evans 2008: 58 (26)

==== Person-unmarked free pronoun ====
Person-unmarked free pronouns occur in languages that do not have distinct forms for all persons. This is commonly found in German. Unlike person-marked pronouns, person-unmarked free pronouns cannot occur in contexts where the pronoun is modifying the noun (i.e. each other's parents), and in contexts where there is a non-subject antecedent (i.e. introduced them to one another).

Die beiden Angeklagten beschuldigten sich gegenseitig (einander) und ihre Nachbarn.
the both defendants accused RECIP mutually {} and their neighbours
'The two defendants accused each other as well as their neighbours.' (Evans 2008: 59 (28))

=== Bound pronoun ===
==== Pronominal affix ====
Reciprocal pronouns can be affixed to either the verb, or to the auxiliary base, as in Warlpiri:

Ngarrka-jarra-rlu ka-pala-nyanu paka-rni.
man-DU-ERG IPFV-3DU.SBJ-RECIP strike-NPST
'The (two) men are striking each other.' (Evans 2008: 60 (30))

==== Pronominal clitic ====
Reciprocal pronominal clitics are commonly found in the Romance languages. These are seen in French and Spanish as se and Italian si. In finite clauses, they are preverbal in French, Italian, and Spanish. In nonfinite clauses and infinitive constructions, the clitic follows the verb in Spanish and Italian, but not in French.

In the Australian language Wanyi, reciprocal pronominal clitics differentiate between person and number, and can attach to other elements, not restricted to attaching to just the verb.

Daba=bulangka kirriya-wiya-a muwa.ji-ni.
hit=3DU.REF woman-pair-ERG/LOC jealous-ERG/LOC
'Two women are hitting each other (i.e. fighting) being jealous.' (Evans 2008: 63 (34b))

=== NP argument ===
==== English each other versus each…the other ====
Examining the semantic relations of reciprocity, we see further differences within reciprocal relationships, such as those between each other and each...the other relations. In general, if it is possible to divide a set (a sentence) into subsets where each subset is an each…the other relationship, then the whole set of events can be described by an each other sentence. Each other constructions characterize an entire set of individuals (as indicated by the plural antecedent), but allow for some vagueness in their interpretation. In contrast, each...the other constructions characterize each member of a set. Therefore, we can see that each other does not force a strict distributional interpretation. If we separate each and other, we can get different interpretations.

(7) a. The men are hugging each other.
    b. Each of the men is hugging  the others.

In (7a) every member of the set the men must be in some reciprocal relationship of hugging at some unspecified point during the time frame of the hugging event. In (7b), we infer that each of the men hugged every other man in the group of men who participated in the hugging event.

In examining the scope of reciprocal pronouns, we can see that in English, the antecedent must be plural and must receive at least a (weakly) distributed interpretation. In viewing each other as one pronoun, each is not assigned scope as a quantifier, thus allowing for a weaker distribution. The distributivity of the above example (7b) is not enforced down to the level of all individuals, as opposed to (7a), in which each as a separate entity and a quantifier enforces strict distributivity.

==== English each other versus one another ====
The other reciprocal pronoun in English is one another. It can be treated exactly the same way as each other. The only difference between the two is the number of antecedent nouns it can encompass. Each other can be used to demonstrate a relationship or action between two subjects, whereas one another can be used to demonstrate a relationship or action between two or more subjects.

(8) a.  There are two men, they hugged each other.
    b. *There are three men, they hugged each other.
    c.  There are three men, they hugged one another.

(9) a. *John, Mary, and Paul see each other.
    b.  John, Mary and Paul see one another.

==== Dutch elkaar versus mekaar ====
The reciprocal pronouns in Dutch are elkaar and mekaar. While elkaar is a single morpheme that is equivalent to the English reciprocal pronoun each other, mekaar is equivalent to the English reciprocal pronoun one another. The difference between the two Dutch reciprocal pronouns is in terms of their use and frequency of use. Mekaar is used less often, mainly in colloquial speech and in children's speech. Similar to English, Dutch elkaar requires the antecedent to be in the same clause:

Jan en Marijke slaan elkaar.
Jan and Marijke hit RECIP
'Jan and Marijke hit each other.'

== Chichewa: verbal affix ==
In English, the reciprocal each other is a noun phrase that takes an argument position of a syntactic predicate, whereas in Chichewa, the reciprocal is an intransitive verbal affix -an. However, the meaning of the reciprocal is the same in both languages. The reciprocals each other and -an both require a group antecedent. The English example in (11a) is interpreted relative to members of the group denoted by the reciprocal antecedent the boys. The same holds of the Chichewa example in (11b): the Chichewa reciprocal likewise requires a group antecedent.

(11) a. The boys are hitting each other.

Mbidzi zi-ku-meny-an-a.
zebras SM-TAM-hit-RECP-FV
'The zebras are hitting each other.'

== Russian ==
In Russian language, the expression "each other" is directly translated with "друг друга" "drug druga".

== See also ==
- Reciprocal construction
- Syntax
