= Arikem language =

Extinct Tupian language of Brazil

Arikem
- Ariquewme
- Ahopovo
- Native to: Brazil
- Region: Rondônia
- Extinct: 1930s
- Language family: Tupian: Arikem; Arikem

Language codes
- ISO 639-3: ait
- Glottolog: arik1264
- Linguasphere: 88-FBA-aa

Arikem is an extinct Tupian language of the state of Rondônia, in the Amazon region of Brazil, formerly spoken by the Arikem people. It had many foreign influences, and was once incorrectly classified as Chapacuran. The Arikem called themselves Ahopovo; the name "Arikem" comes from the Urupa language.

== Vocabulary ==
=== Rondon & Faria (1948) ===
Below is a vocabulary of the Arikem language, taken from the Rondon Commission's vocabularies.

Arikem vocabulary
| Gloss | Arikem |
|---|---|
| head | ó |
| tooth | nhóiôn |
| ear | uruçáua |
| hand | pú |
| water | exê |
| fire | xombí |
| stone | ixó |
| woman | oxepára |
| tapir | irú |
| maize | guió |
