= Urumi language =

Extinct Tupian language of Brazil

Urumi
- Native to: Brazil
- Region: Rondônia
- Extinct: after 1913
- Language family: Tupian: Ramarama; Urumi

Language codes
- ISO 639-3: uru
- Glottolog: urum1250
- Linguasphere: 88-DAA-ab

Urumi is an extinct Tupian language of the state of Rondônia, in the Amazon region of Brazil. It was documented by the Rondon Commission.

== Vocabulary ==
=== Numerals ===
Urumi numerals
Numeral	Urumi
1	Uenacaveu
2	lchirangue
3	Itamaiun (?) Itamanin (?)
4	Itajanire (?) Itajanin (?)
5	ltamamo
6	Icarobüte
7	ltaguto
8	ltagobin
9	Icaúnhé
10	Copongé
