= Apapocuva =

Agricultural Tupian tribe of the Chiripá group of southern Brazil

The Apapocúva (Apapokuva), also known as the Nandeva, are an agricultural Tupian tribe of the Chiripá group of southern Brazil, living in the state of São Paulo. Population: 500. They speak the Chiripa language.
