= Reciprocal construction =

Sentence with two or more simultaneous agents and patients

A reciprocal construction (abbreviated RECP) is a grammatical pattern in which each of the participants occupies both the role of agent and patient with respect to the other. An example is the English sentence John and Mary criticized each other: John criticized Mary, and Mary criticized John. Reciprocal constructions can be said to express mutual relationships.

Many languages, such as Semitic languages, Altaic languages or Bantu languages, have special reciprocal affixes in verbs. For example, Turkish reciprocal constructions which might also have slightly different meanings than the verbs they originate from, have the suffix -iş (-ış, -uş or -üş depending on the vowel harmony):

infinitive form	English	reciprocal form	English
tanımak	to know	tanışmak	to know each other
sevmek	to love	sevişmek	to make love
bulmak	to find	buluşmak	to meet each other
öpmek	to kiss	öpüşmek	to kiss each other

Other languages, including English, use reciprocal pronouns such as "each other" to indicate a mutual relation. Latin uses the preposition inter and its reflexive pronoun inter se (between themselves) when the verb is third person. Most Indo-European languages do not have special reciprocal affixes on verbs, and mutual relations are expressed through reflexive constructions or other mechanisms. For example, Russian reciprocal constructions have the suffix -sja (-ся, 'self'), which also has reflexive and passive interpretations.

== See also ==
- Reciprocal pronoun
- Reflexive verb
