= Mawé language =

Tupian language spoken in Brazil

Mawé
- Sateré
- Native to: Brazil
- Region: Amazonas
- Ethnicity: (undated figure of 7,000 Mawé people)
- Native speakers: 9,200 (2008)
- Language family: Tupian: Mawé

Official status
- Official language in: Brazil (Amazonas)

Language codes
- ISO 639-3: mav
- Glottolog: sate1243
- ELP: Mawé
- Linguasphere: 88-BAA-a

The Mawé language of Brazil, also known as Sateré (Mabue), is one of the Tupian languages. It is spoken by 7,000 Mawé people, many of them monolingual.

== Phonology ==
=== Consonants ===
	Labial	Alveolar	Palatal	Velar	Glottal
Plosive	p	t		k	ʔ
Nasal	m	n		ŋ	
Fricative		s			h
Tap		ɾ			
Approximant	w		j		

=== Vowels ===
	Front	Central	Back
High	i ĩ iː	ɨ ɨː	u ũ uː
Mid	e ẽ eː		o
Low		a ã aː	
