= Munduruku languages =

Mundurukú
- Geographic distribution: Brazil
- Linguistic classification: Tupian: Mundurukú
- Proto-language: Proto-Mundurukú
- Subdivisions: Munduruku; Kuruáya

Language codes
- Glottolog: mund1329

The Mundurukú languages of Brazil form a branch of the Tupian language family. They are Munduruku and the extinct Kuruáya.

== Proto-language ==
Some Proto-Mundurukú reconstructions by Picanço (2005) are as follows.

English gloss	Proto-Mundurukú
wild cat	**sipɔrɔ
macaw, sp.	**sipaLa
It burned.	**o-si-pik
bird	**oasɨ̃
manioc	**masɨk
babaçu	**kosɨ
fish, sp.	**isɨe
snake	**pɨy
leaf	**tɨp / **Lɨp
sling	**tobɨy / **Lobɨy
my cultivated garden	**o-kɨʔ
an old lady	**abɨt
the day after tomorrow	**kɨyaCe
to go	**Cɨ / **Dɨ
my name	**o-bɨtet
It's cold.	**i-Cɨk
Who?	**abɨ
my finger/hand	**o-bɨʔ
It's smoked.	**i-pɨrɨk
piquia tree	**ʃaʔip
fire/firewood	**Laʃa
I slept.	**oʃet
ant, sp.	**wiʃaʔ
fish, sp.	**Laʃew/oy
chief	**toʃaw
louse	**kip
child	**bɨkit
mosquito	**tʃik
be hot	**takjVp
