= Awetí language =

Endangered Tupian language spoken in Brazil

Awetí
- Auetö
- Awytyza ti’ingku
- Pronunciation: [awɨˈtɨʐa tʃĩˈʔĩŋku]
- Native to: Brazil
- Region: Xingu Indigenous Park, Mato Grosso
- Ethnicity: Aweti people
- Native speakers: 170 (2011)
- Language family: Tupian: Awetí

Language codes
- ISO 639-3: awe
- Glottolog: awet1244
- ELP: Awetí
- Linguasphere: 88-IAA-aa

The Awetí or Aweti language is one of the Tupian languages of Central Brazil. Spoken by the indigenous Aweti people that live along the Upper Xingu River, the language is in danger of becoming extinct with a declining 150 living speakers.

== Sociolinguistic situation ==
In 2002 there was a major shift in the Xingu tribe. A group of Aweti people separated from the main village and built their own. Because the family spoke both Aweti and Kamaiura it lessened the amount of Aweti speakers in the main village and it continued to decrease the amount of Aweti speakers in the new village as they began to communicate in Kamaiura only. Because of this many Aweti people only speak Kamaiura today. Most Aweti people are multilingual. Portuguese is the main language of Brazil, so a lot of Aweti people also speak Portuguese, especially the younger generation, since that is what is spoken at school.

== Name of the language ==
The language can also be found under the forms Awety, Awetö, Aueto, Aueti, Auiti, Auití, Auetö, and similar variants.

The name of the language originates from the ethnonym [aˈwɨtɨ], by which the Awetí are known among neighboring groups. They call themselves [awɨˈtɨʐa], with the Awetí collective suffix -za, and refer to their own language as [awɨˈtɨʐa tʃĩˈʔĩŋku], Awytyza ti’ingku (language of the Awetí).

In the writings of early German explorers, the name appears as “Auetö” or “Auetö́.” In these forms, the first [ɨ], which is unstressed in Awetí, was represented as ⟨e⟩, possibly because of its resemblance to the schwa [ə], a common sound in German. The second [ɨ] was written as ⟨ö⟩, a letter that represents the sounds [œ] and [ø] in German, which also somewhat resemble [ɨ].

The ⟨u⟩ was later replaced with ⟨w⟩, in accordance with the rules for representing indigenous names established by the Brazilian Anthropology Association (ABA). The ⟨ö⟩, which is not used in Portuguese, was replaced by ⟨i⟩, and less frequently by ⟨o⟩, or sometimes even by ⟨e⟩ or ⟨y⟩.

Today, the most common designation for the group and their language is Awetí or Aweti, with the latter more often used in Portuguese. In English, the preferred spelling includes an acute accent on the final ⟨i⟩, again following ABA norms, to encourage stress on the last syllable, which reflects how the name is pronounced in Portuguese, including by the Awetí themselves when speaking Portuguese.

Several different spellings of the people and language can be found in the literature. They differ in having one or several of the above changes applied or not applied: ⟨u⟩–⟨w⟩, ⟨ö⟩–⟨i⟩–⟨e⟩–⟨y⟩, graphical accent or not, sometimes also the ⟨e⟩ [middle syllable] is substituted by ⟨i⟩. In particular in older and non-Brazilian literature, one finds, for instance: Awetö, Aueto, Aueti, Auiti, rarely also Auetê or even Auety, etc. Sometimes (notably in the "Ethnologue") the Awetí are confused with other central Brazilian groups such as the Arauine and Arauite, both extinct in the beginning of the 20th century.

== Phonology ==
=== Consonants ===
| | Labial | Alveolar | Retroflex | Palatal | Velar | Glottal |
|---|---|---|---|---|---|---|
| Nasal | m | n | | | ŋ | |
| Stop | p | t | | | k | ʔ |
| Affricate | | t͡s | | | | |
| Fricative | | | ʐ | | ɣ | (h) |
| Tap/Flap | | ɾ | | | | |
| Approximant | | l | | j | w | |

/p, k/ may also be lenited as [β, ɣ] in intervocalic positions.

Aweti does not contain voiced stops, however the language does have stress.

=== Vowels ===
| | front | central | back |
|---|---|---|---|
| close | i ĩ | ɨ ɨ̃ | u ũ |
| mid | e ẽ | | o õ |
| open | | a ã | |

Sounds /e, a, o/ and /ẽ, ã, õ/ may also be heard as [ɛ, ə, ɔ], [ɛ̃, ə̃, ɔ̃].

== Lexicality ==
Subordination plays a big role in Aweti speech and text. Nominal modification and predicate complementation are used through subordinatory phrases.
