= Xipaya language =

Endangered Tupian language of Brazil

Xipaya
- Region: Brazil
- Native speakers: 1 (2024)
- Language family: Tupian: Yurúna; Xipaya

Language codes
- ISO 639-3: xiy
- Glottolog: xipa1240
- ELP: Xipaya
- Linguasphere: 88-CBA-ab
- 88-JAA-ab

Xipaya (or Shipaja or Xipaia) is an endangered language spoken in the Pará region of Brazil. It is one of the approximately 70 Tupian languages of South America. At last count, Xipaya was only spoken by one elderly woman, Maria Xipaya, in Altamira, Pará. It is closely related to the Yuruna language.

== Phonology ==
Consonants of Xipaya
	Bilabial	Alveolar	Post-alveolar	Palatal	Velar	Labial–velar	Glottal
Plosive	b p	d t			k		
Nasal	m	n					
Sibilant fricative		z s	ʃ				
Non-sibilant fricative							h
Approximant				j		w	
Lateral approximant		l					

Vowels of Xipaya
	Front	Central	Back
Close	i ĩ	ɨ ɨ̃	u ũ
Close-mid	e		
Open	a ã		
