= Purubora language =

Endangered Tupian language of Brazil

Puruborá
- Native to: Brazil
- Region: Rondônia
- Ethnicity: 243 Puruborá (2014)
- Native speakers: 2 (2015)
- Language family: Tupian: Purubora–Ramarama; Puruborá

Language codes
- ISO 639-3: pur
- Glottolog: puru1264
- ELP: Puruborá
- Linguasphere: 88-HAA-aa

The Puruborá language of Brazil is a Tupian language. It is spoken in the Brazilian state of Rondônia, in Costa Marques and around the headwaters of the Rio São Miguel tributary of the right bank of the Guaporé. It is nearly extinct, with only two speakers reported in 2015 and 243 Puruborá people reported in 2014.

== Phonology ==
=== Consonants ===
		Labial	Alveolar	Palatal	Velar	Glottal
Plosive	voiceless	p	t		k	ʔ
Plosive	voiced	b	d			
Plosive	prenasal	ᵐb	ⁿd			
Plosive	implosive	ɓ	ɗ			
Nasal		m	n			
Fricative	voiceless			ʃ		h
Fricative	voiced			ʒ		
Tap			ɾ			
Approximant		w		j		

- /j/ has an allophone of [ɲ] when before or in between nasal vowels.
- [ŋ] is an allophone of /n/ when before /k/, or is also an allophone of /k/ when after nasal vowels in word-final position.
- /w/ may also be heard as [β] when before high vowels or in free variation with [w].
- Stops /t, d/ are also heard as palatalized [tʲ, dʲ] when before /i/.

=== Vowels ===
	Front	Central	Back
Close	i ĩ	ɨ ɨ̃	u ũ
Mid	ẽ	ə ə̃	o õ
Open-mid	ɛ		(ɔ)
Open		a ã	

[ɔ] may also be heard as an allophone of /o/.

== Vocabulary ==
Loukotka (1968) lists the following basic vocabulary items.

gloss	Puruborá
one	múm
two	wewáb
three	bokód-wewáb
head	azyá
ear	zapetó
tooth	inká
hand	wapitái
woman	bagoyá
water	zereré
fire	ndamizyá
stone	muruá
maize	zyiá
tapir	taní
