= Tupian languages =

Indigenous language family in South America

Tupian
- Geographic distribution: Brazil, Bolivia, Paraguay, Uruguay, North-east Argentina, Southern Colombia, Northern Peru
- Ethnicity: Guaranís and Tupi people
- Native speakers: 6.5 million
- Linguistic classification: Je-Tupi-Carib?: Tupian
- Proto-language: Proto-Tupian
- Subdivisions: Tupi–Guarani; Arikem; Awetï; Mawé; Mondé; Mundurukú; Puruborá–Ramarama; Tuparí; Yurúna

Language codes
- ISO 639-2 / 5: tup
- Glottolog: tupi1275
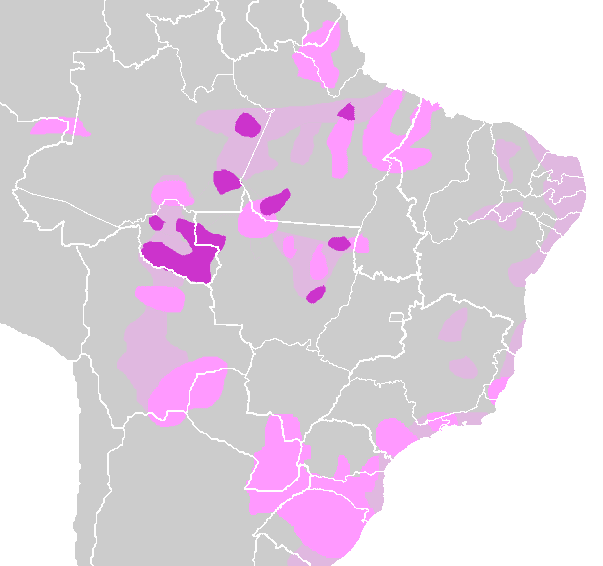
- Tupi–Guarani (medium pink), other Tupian (violet), and probable range c. 1500 (pink-grey)

The Tupi or Tupian language family comprises some 70 languages spoken in South America, of which the best known are Tupi proper and Guarani.

== Homeland ==
Rodrigues (2007) considers the Proto-Tupian urheimat to be somewhere between the Guaporé and Aripuanã rivers, in the Madeira River basin. Much of this area corresponds to the modern-day state of Rondônia, Brazil. Five of the ten Tupian branches are found in this area, as well as some Tupi–Guarani languages (especially Kawahíb), making it the probable urheimat of these languages and maybe of its speaking peoples. Rodrigues believes the Proto-Tupian language dates back to around 3,000 BC.

== Language contact ==
Tupian languages have extensively influenced many language families in South America. Jolkesky (2016) notes that there are lexical similarities with the Arawa, Bora-Muinane, Guato, Irantxe, Jivaro, Karib, Kayuvava, Mura-Matanawi, Taruma, Trumai, Yanomami, Harakmbet, Katukina-Katawixi, Arawak, Bororo, Karaja, Macro-Mataguayo-Guaykuru, Takana, Nadahup, and Puinave-Kak language families due to contact.

== History, members and classification ==
Approximately 3,000 years ago, Tupian-speaking peoples began expanding from southwestern Amazonia, with speakers of the Tupi–Guarani languages later spreading to other parts of South America. In southern Brazil, the expansion of Tupi-Guarani groups, particularly the Guarani, displaced or confined earlier inhabitants, including speakers of Macro-Jê languages, from parts of the Atlantic coast and river valleys to more inland and upland areas.

When the Portuguese arrived in Brazil, they found that wherever they went along the vast coast of South America, most of the indigenous peoples spoke similar languages. Jesuit missionaries utilized these similarities, systematizing common standards then named línguas gerais ("general languages"), which were spoken in that region until the 19th century. The best known and most widely spoken of these languages was Old Tupi, a modern descendant of which is still used today by indigenous peoples around the Rio Negro region, where it is known as Nheengatu ([ɲɛʔẽŋaˈtu]), or the "good language". However, the Tupi family also comprises other languages.

In the neighbouring Spanish colonies, Guarani, another Tupian language closely related to Old Tupi, had a similar history, but managed to resist the spread of Spanish more successfully than Tupi resisted Portuguese. Today, Guarani has seven million speakers, and is one of the official languages of Paraguay. The Tupian family also includes several other languages with fewer speakers. These share irregular morphology with the Je and Carib families, and Rodrigues connects them all as a Je–Tupi–Carib family.

=== Rodrigues & Cabral (2012) ===
Rodrigues & Cabral (2012) list ten branches of Tupian, which cluster into Western Tupian and Eastern Tupian. Within Western and Eastern Tupian, the most divergent branches are listed first, followed by the core branches.

- Tupian
  - Western Tupian
    - Arikém (2 languages)
    - Tuparí (6 languages)
    - Mondé (6 languages)
    - Puruborá
    - Ramaráma (Rondônia) (2 languages)
  - Eastern Tupian
    - Yurúna (Jurúna) (3 languages)
    - Mundurukú (2 languages)
    - Mawé
    - Awetï
    - Tupi–Guarani (50 languages: Tupí [extinct], Guaraní (5 million speakers), etc.)

Meira and Drude (2015) posit a branch uniting Mawé and Aweti with Tupi-Guarani, also known as Maweti-Guarani. Purubora may form a branch together with Ramarama.

=== Jolkesky (2016) ===
Internal classification by Jolkesky (2016):

(† = extinct)

- Tupi family
  - Arikem
    - Arikem †
    - Karitiana
  - Monde
    - Paiter
    - Monde, Nuclear
      - Monde
      - Cinta-Larga-Zoro
        - Arua
        - Cinta-Larga
        - Gavião; Zoro
  - Ramarama-Purubora
    - Purubora
    - Ramarema: Karo; Urumi
  - Tupari
    - Makurap
    - Tupari, Nuclear
      - Sakurabiat-Akuntsu
        - Akuntsu
        - Sakurabiat
      - Kepkiriwat †
      - Tupari
      - Wayoro
  - Tupi, Nuclear
    - Juruna
      - Juruna
      - Manitsawa †
      - Shipaya
    - Munduruku
      - Kuruaya
      - Munduruku
    - Mawe-Aweti-Tupi-Guarani
      - Satere-Mawe
      - Aweti-Tupi-Guarani
        - Aweti
        - Tupi-Guarani (see)

=== Galucio et al. (2015) ===
Galucio et al. (2015) give the following phylogenetic tree of Tupian, based on a computational phylogenetic analysis.

- Tupian
  - Western (40.6% probability)
    - Karo; Puruborá
    - Mondé
      - Suruí
      - Nuclear Mondé
        - Salamãy
        - Aruá; Gavião, Zoró
  - Eastern (40.6% probability)
    - Arikém
      - Karitiána
    - Tuparí
      - Makuráp
      - Nuclear Tuparí
        - Akuntsú, Mekéns
        - Wayoró, Tuparí
    - Mundurukú
      - Mundurukú
      - Kuruáya
    - Jurúna
      - Jurúna
      - Xipáya
    - Mawetí–Guaraní
      - Mawé
      - Awetí–Guaraní
        - Awetí
        - Tupí–Guaraní
          - Parintintín
          - Tapirapé; Urubú-Ka'apór, Paraguayan Guaraní

== See also ==
- Apapocuva
- Indigenous languages of the Americas
- Languages of Brazil
- Língua Geral
- List of Spanish words of Indigenous American Indian origin
