= Candeias =

Candeias may refer to:

== Places in Brazil ==
- Candeias, Bahia, municipality in the state of Bahia
- Candeias, Minas Gerais, municipality in the state of Minas Gerais
- Candeias do Jamari, municipality in the state of Rondônia

== People with the surname ==
- Daniel Candeias, Portuguese footballer
- Hermenegildo Candeias (1934–2023), Portuguese Olympic gymnast

== Other uses ==
- Grupo Candeias, Capoeira group
- Candeias River, river of Rondônia, Brazil

== See also ==
- Preto de Candeias River, river of Rondônia, Brazil
