= Bom Futuro National Forest =

National forest in Rondônia, Brazil

- Floresta Nacional do Bom Futuro
- IUCN category VI (protected area with sustainable use of natural resources)
- Location within Brazil
- Coordinates: 9.437438°S 63.836414°W
- Area: 97,357 hectares (240,570 acres)
- Designation: National forest
- Created: 21 June 1988
- Administrator: Chico Mendes Institute for Biodiversity Conservation

The Bom Futuro National Forest (Portuguese: Floresta Nacional do Bom Futuro) is a national forest in the state of Rondônia, Brazil. The forest has been subject to a massive invasion of loggers, ranchers and farmers.

== Location ==
The Bom Futuro National Forest is divided between the municipalities of Buritis and Porto Velho, Rondônia. It has an area of 97,357 hectares (240,570 acres). It adjoins the Rio Pardo Environmental Protection Area to the south, the Jaci Paraná Extractive Reserve to the southwest and the Karitiana Indigenous Territory to the west. The forest would be included in the proposed Western Amazon Ecological Corridor, connecting it to neighboring conservation units.

The forest holds the sources of tributaries of the Jamari River via the Candeias River, and of the Jaci Paraná River via the Rio Branco. The forest was relatively intact in 1995. The original vegetation was mainly open submontane rainforest and dense submontane rainforest, with savanna/rainforest contact, open alluvial rainforest and pioneer alluvial formations.

== Land invasion ==
From 2000 an invasion began first of loggers, then of squatters and land speculators, supported by local politicians. The urban settlement of Rio Pardo developed inside the forest, with more than ten sawmills and with associations to promote allocation of land to farmers and ranchers. The Brazilian Institute of Environment and Renewable Natural Resources (IBAMA) attempted to expel the invaders on at least two occasions, but was unsuccessful in part due to lack of funding from the headquarters of the agency.

By 2003 some sawmills had been closed, but Rio Pardo was now a normal settlement with shops, a gas station, hotel, telephones and other public services. According to Imazon by 2007 about 78,800 hectares (195,000 acres) of the forest had been cleared, or 32% of the total area, at an annual rate of 4.34% deforestation from 2002 to 2007. In April 2007 IBAMA listed 236 ranchers operating illegally in the forest, with about 18,600 cattle.

== Legislative history ==
The Bom Futuro National Forest was created by federal decree 96.188 of 21 June 1988 with an estimated area of 280,000 hectares (690,000 acres). It is administered by the Chico Mendes Institute for Biodiversity Conservation (ICMBio). It is classed as IUCN protected area category VI (protected area with sustainable use of natural resources). The objective is to support sustainable multiple use of forest resources, and scientific research with emphasis on methods for sustainable exploitation of native forests.

On 15 July 2009 a working group was created with the objective of solving the social and environmental problems caused by the illegal occupation of the forest. Ordnance 3109 of 29 September 2009 authorized use of the national public security forces to support IBAMA in curbing deforestation. Law 12249 of 11 June 2010 amended the limits of the forest, reducing its area from 280,000 hectares (690,000 acres) to about 97,357 hectares (240,570 acres). The road linking the settlement of Rio Pardo to BR-364 was excluded, as was an area of 31,300 hectares (77,000 acres) that had previously overlapped with the Karitiana Indigenous Territory.. Law 2894 created a program to compensate families relocated from the forest. Ordnance 138 of 15 December 2014 created the consultative council for the forest.

== Sources ==
- Ayres, José Márcio; Da Fonseca, Gustavo A. B.; Rylands, Anthony B.; Queiroz, Helder L.; Pinto, Luiz Paulo; Masterson, Donald; Cavalcanti, Roberto B. (2005), Os Corredores Ecológicos das Florestas Tropicais do Brasil (PDF) (in Portuguese), Sociedade Civil Mamirauá, archived from the original (PDF) on 2016-07-31
- Flona Bom Futuro (in Portuguese), ICMBio: Chico Mendes Institute for Biodiversity Conservation
- FLONA do Bom Futuro (in Portuguese), ISA: Instituto Socioambiental
- Unidade de Conservação: Floresta Nacional de Bom Futuro (in Portuguese), MMA: Ministério do Meio Ambiente
