= Parecis =

Parecis or Parecís may refer to:

- Parecis, Rondônia, a municipality in Brazil
- Parecis Plateau, a plateau in Brazil
- Parecis River, a river in Mato Grosso, Brazil
- Parecís language or Paresi, an Arawakan language of Brazil

== See also ==
- Pareci (disambiguation)
- Paresis, a medical condition
