= Ji-Paraná River =

Ji-Paraná River Machado River
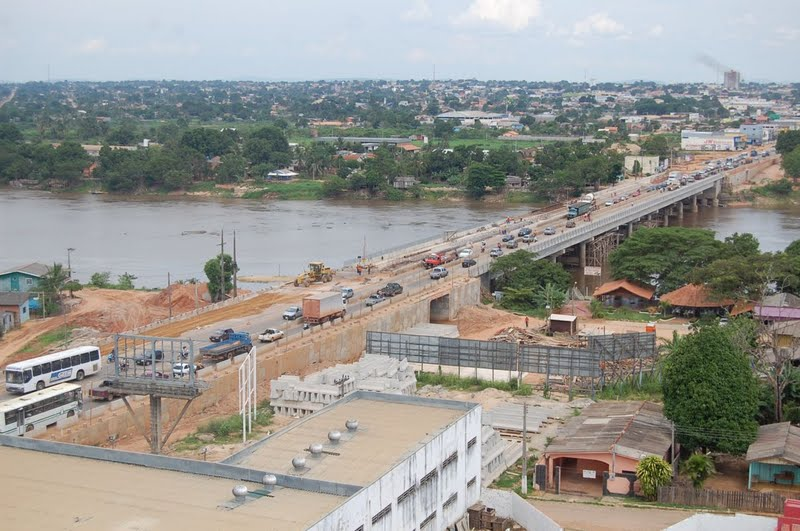
- Bridge (BR-364 highway) over the river in Ji-Paraná city

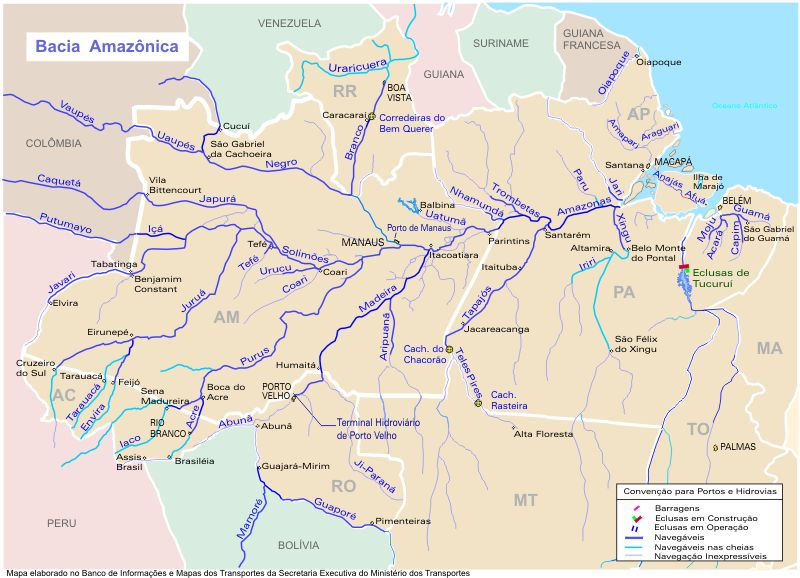
- Location of the mouth of the Ji-Paraná River in the Amazonas watershed

Location
- Country: Brazil

Physical characteristics
- Source
  - location: Confluence of Pimenta Bueno and Comemoração, Parecis plateau, Rondônia, Brazil
  - elevation: 173 m (568 ft)
- Mouth: Madeira River
  - location: Rondônia, Brazil
  - coordinates: 8°02′55″S 62°53′51″W
  - elevation: 43 m (141 ft)
- Length: 820 km (510 mi)
- Basin size: 76,127 km^{2} (29,393 mi^{2})
- Discharge
  - location: Confluence of Madeira, Rondônia
  - average: 2,100 m^{3}/s (74,000 cu ft/s)
  - minimum: 596 m^{3}/s (21,000 cu ft/s)
  - maximum: 4,360 m^{3}/s (154,000 cu ft/s)

Basin features
- Progression: Madeira → Amazon → Atlantic Ocean
- River system: Amazon
- Tributaries
  - left: Pimenta Bueno, Jaru, Rolim de Moura, Muqui, Urupá, Machadinho, Juruazinho, Preto
  - right: Comemoração, São João

The Ji-Paraná River (Machado River), sometimes spelled Jiparaná, is a river in Rondônia state in western Brazil. It is a tributary of the Madeira River in the Amazon Basin. For much of its length it runs roughly parallel with the northeastern state border of Rondônia. The city of Ji-Paraná is divided by the river.

Part of the river's basin is covered by the 221,218 hectares (546,640 acres) Jacundá National Forest, a sustainable use conservation unit. Part of the basin is in the 346,861 hectares (857,110 acres) Jaru Biological Reserve, a fully protected conservation unit created in 1984. The river forms the southern boundary in Rondônia of the Campos Amazônicos National Park, a 961,318 hectares (2,375,470 acres) protected area created in 2006 that holds an unusual enclave of cerrado vegetation in the Amazon rainforest.

== See also ==
- List of rivers of Rondônia
