= Guaporé Biological Reserve =

- Reserva Biológica do Guaporé
- IUCN category Ia (strict nature reserve)
- Location within Brazil
- Nearest city: Cacoal, Rondônia
- Coordinates: 12.426°S 62.889°W
- Area: 615,771 hectares (1,521,600 acres)
- Created: 20 September 1982
- Designated: biological reserve
- Administrator: ICMBio

Ramsar Wetland
- Designated: 22 March 2017
- Reference no.: 2297

Guaporé Biological Reserve (Portuguese: Reserva Biológica do Guaporé is a biological reserve in the state of Rondônia, Brazil, on the border with Bolivia.

== Location ==
The reserve of 615,771 hectares (1,521,600 acres) in the Amazon biome was created by decree 87,587 on 20 September 1982. The reserve is managed by the Chico Mendes Institute for Biodiversity Conservation. It lies in the municipalities of Alta Floresta d'Oeste and São Francisco do Guaporé in the state of Rondônia. Altitude is from 132 to 495 metres (433 to 1,624 ft). Annual rainfall is 2,100 millimetres (83 in). Temperatures range from 15 to 33 °C (59 to 91 °F) with an average of 25 °C (77 °F).

== Hydrology ==
The reserve lies in the Guaporé Depression, an extensive pediplain with permanent wetlands and areas subject to periodic flooding by the rivers Guaporé, São Miguel, Branco and Massaco. The rivers are in the basin of the Madeira River, a tributary of the Amazon River. They have their origins in the southern foothills of the Chapada dos Parecis. In this area the Guaporé River forms the boundary between Brazil and Bolivia. The Guaporé and São Miguel rivers form the north west, west and south west borders and are of great importance as natural barriers against the encroachment of loggers and illegal farmers.

The Guaporé and its tributaries, the São Miguel, Branco, São Simão, Massaco and Colorado, begin to rise in October or November, fed by rainstorms, and continue to be high until March, when there is a significant reduction in water levels in the following months. Some sections of the Guaporé and its tributaries hold large floating colonies of Eichhornia (water hyacinth) species, which sometimes clog the rivers and prevent boat traffic.

== Vegetation ==
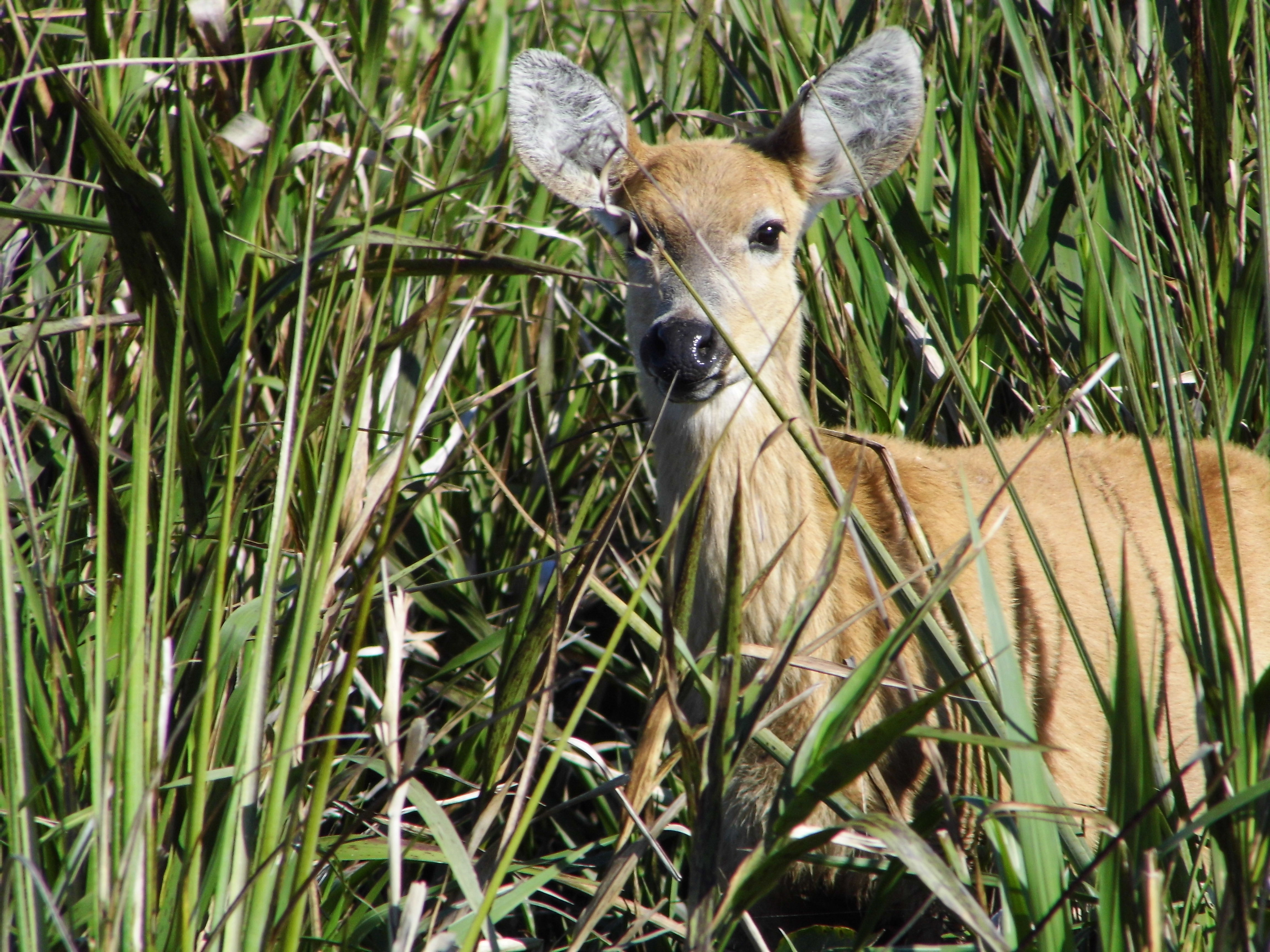
Marsh deer

The vegetation is mainly dense forest apart from Chapada dos Parecis and parts of the Serra dos Pacáas Novos. There is great diversity of flora in the reserve, which is in the transition area between the Cerrado and Amazon biomes, and also has species characteristic of the Pantanal. Landscapes include open canopy alluvial forest in areas subject to flooding and open canopy submontane forest in areas with elevations of 100 to 600 metres (330 to 1,970 ft). The well-spaced tree forming the upper layer do not exceed 30 metres (98 ft) in height and let light through to the dense understory, which includes many representatives of the Rubiaceae, Melastomataceae and Piperaceae families. Common tree species include Attalea speciosa, Euterpe precatoria Euterpe oleracea, Leopoldinia piassaba, Bertholletia excelsa and Hevea brasiliensis.

There are scattered areas of dense canopy Atlantic alluvial rain forest with emergent evergreens reaching 46 metres (151 ft) in height. This type of vegetation includes significant numbers of palm trees and vines. Common species in these areas include Manilkara amazonica, Apuleia molaris, Brosimum ovatifolium, Aspidosperma album and Vochysia guianensis. The Buriti Pioneer River Formation is dominated by the Mauritia flexuosa (buriti palm). It is the last example of this type of vegetation in Rondonia, and covers an area of about 24 square kilometres (9.3 sq mi). It is a delicate environment that provides a unique habitat for macaws that nest in the palms trees and marsh deer that breed in the environment.

== Conservation ==
The Biological Reserve is a "strict nature reserve" under IUCN protected area category Ia. The purpose is to fully preserve the biota and other natural attributes without human interference.. Specifically it was created to protect a representative sample of the transition ecosystem between the Amazon Forest and the Cerrado, as well as samples of aquatic ecosystems of rivers, lakes, fields and flooded forests, while protecting threatened or endangered species.. Protected species are marsh deer (Blastocerus dichotomus), jaguar (Panthera onca) and giant otter (Pteronura brasiliensis). The reserve would be included in the proposed Western Amazon Ecological Corridor.

== Sources ==
- Ayres, José Márcio; Da Fonseca, Gustavo A. B.; Rylands, Anthony B.; Queiroz, Helder L.; Pinto, Luiz Paulo; Masterson, Donald; Cavalcanti, Roberto B. (2005), Os Corredores Ecológicos das Florestas Tropicais do Brasil (PDF) (in Portuguese), Sociedade Civil Mamirauá, archived from the original (PDF) on 2016-07-31
- Reserva Biológica do Guaporé (in Portuguese), Chico Mendes Institute for Biodiversity Conservation
- "Reserva Biológica do Guaporé", ViaRural (in Portuguese), archived from the original on April 23, 2016
- Triana, Elisa (29 May 2009), "Strict Nature Reserves in Brazil", The Encyclopedia of Earth
- Unidade de Conservação: Reserva Biológica do Guaporé (in Portuguese), MMA: Ministério do Meio Ambiente
