= Pacaás Novos National Park =

National park in Rondônia, Brazil

- Parque Nacional de Pacaás Novo
- IUCN category II (national park)
- Location within Brazil
- Location: Rondônia, Brazil
- Nearest city: Guajará-Mirim, Rondônia
- Coordinates: 11°10′S 63°26′W
- Area: 708,664 hectares (1,751,150 acres).
- Designation: National park
- Established: 21 September 1979
- Governing body: ICMBio

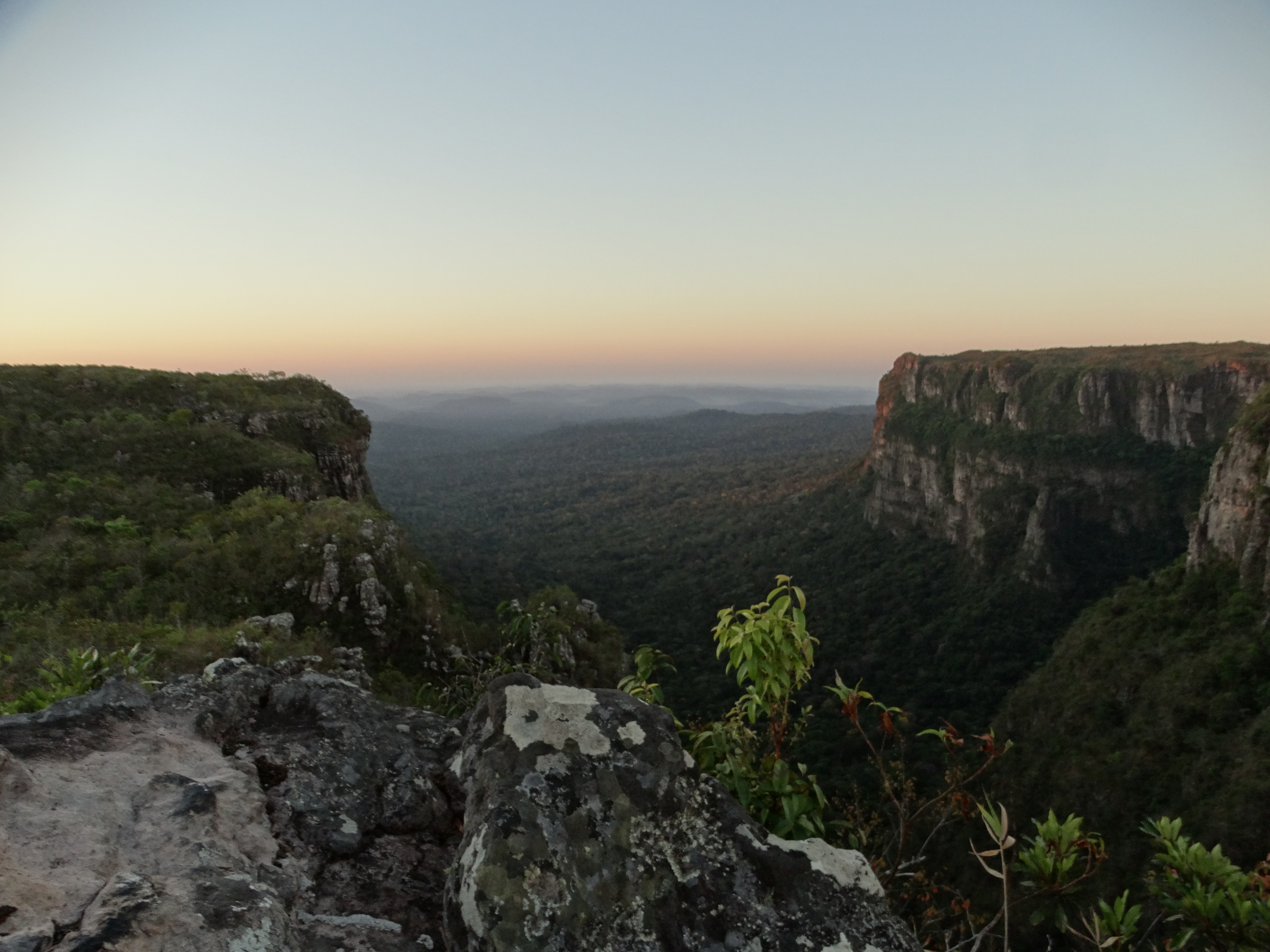
Pacaás Novos National Park

Pacaás Novos National Park (Portuguese: Parque Nacional de Pacaás Novos) is a national park in the state of Rondônia, Brazil. The park contains a mountain range by the same name.

== Location ==
The park is in the Amazon biome. It covers an area of 708,664 hectares (1,751,150 acres). It was established by decree 84.019 of 21 September 1979, and is administered by the Chico Mendes Institute for Biodiversity Conservation. The park covers parts of the municipalities of Alvorada d'Oeste, Campo Novo de Rondônia, Governador Jorge Teixeira, Guajará-Mirim, Mirante da Serra and Nova Mamoré in the state of Rondônia.

The park takes its name from the Pacaás Novos River, which rises in the Pacaás Novos mountains in the west of the park and flows southwest via the Rio Pacaás Novos Extractive Reserve to join the Mamoré River just south of Guajará-Mirim. To the west the park adjoins the Guajará-Mirim State Park.

Annual rainfall averages 764 millimetres (30.1 in). Temperatures range from 5 to 37 °C (41 to 99 °F) with an average of 25 °C (77 °F). Altitudes ranges from 100 to 1,230 metres (330 to 4,040 ft). The Pico Tracoá is the highest point in park and in the state at 1,230 metres (4,040 ft).

== Conservation ==
The park is classed as IUCN protected area category II (national park). The objectives are to preserve a representative sample of the transition between the Cerrado and the Amazon rainforest, to protect about 2,000 springs of three major river basins, to contribute to the integrity of the Rondônia Center Mosaic, to protect species of fauna and flora and endangered plant species endemic to the family Podocarpaceae, and to preserve the scenic beauty of the region. The park would be included in the proposed Western Amazon Ecological Corridor. Protected species in the park include the black-shouldered opossum (Caluromysiops irrupta).

== Sources ==
- Ayres, José Márcio; Da Fonseca, Gustavo A. B.; Rylands, Anthony B.; Queiroz, Helder L.; Pinto, Luiz Paulo; Masterson, Donald; Cavalcanti, Roberto B. (2005), Os Corredores Ecológicos das Florestas Tropicais do Brasil (PDF) (in Portuguese), Sociedade Civil Mamirauá, archived from the original (PDF) on 2016-07-31
- PARNA Pacaás Novos (in Portuguese), ISA: Instituto Socioambiental
- Parque Nacional de Pacaás Novos (in Portuguese), Chico Mendes Institute for Biodiversity Conservation, archived from the original on 2019-08-26
- Unidade de Conservação: Parque Nacional de Pacaás Novos (in Portuguese), MMA: Ministério do Meio Ambiente
