= Jaci Paraná Extractive Reserve =

Extractive reserve in the state of Rondônia, Brazil

- Reserva Extrativista Jaci Paraná
- IUCN category VI (protected area with sustainable use of natural resources)
- Location within Brazil
- Nearest city: Porto Velho, Rondônia
- Coordinates: 9.779774°S 64.208827°W
- Area: 197,364 hectares (487,700 acres)
- Designation: Extractive reserve
- Created: 17 January 1996
- Administrator: Secretaria de Estado do Desenvolvimento Ambiental

The Jaci Paraná Extractive Reserve (Portuguese: Reserva Extrativista Jaci Paraná) is an Extractive reserve in the state of Rondônia, Brazil. The traditional population is engaged in sustainable use of natural forest resources. It has been subject to illegal invasions by loggers and farmers. In 2014, an attempt was made to revoke the reserve.

== Location ==
The Jaci Paraná Extractive Reserve is divided between the municipalities of Buritis (21.29%) Nova Mamoré (12.98%) and Porto Velho (65.73%) in the state of Rondônia. It has an area of 197,364 hectares (487,700 acres). The Jaci Paraná River forms its western boundary. Altitudes range from 100 to 250 metres (330 to 820 ft) above sea level. The reserve adjoins the Rio Pardo Environmental Protection Area to the east and the Bom Futuro National Forest to the northeast, separated from these two units by the Rio Branco, a tributary of the Jaci Paraná River. The reserve would be included in the proposed Western Amazon Ecological Corridor, connecting it to neighboring conservation units.

== Economy ==
The reserve is in an area of rubber concessions, generically called the Jaci Paraná concessions, that had been used for more than a century. It is federally owned land. The traditional residents mainly collect native fruits such as cupuaçu, tucumã, açaí and bacuri, collect Brazil nuts and extract rubber. Most of the people practice hunting and fishing to some extent, and some agriculture. The Jaci-Paraná Rubber Tappers Association represents the residents in managing the reserve.

The reserve has suffered from invasion by loggers and squatters, and large amounts of timber have been illegally harvested. According to Imazon, between 2002 and 2007 the rate of deforestation in the reserve was 3.74%, second only to the Bom Futuro National Forest at 4.34%. By July 2007, 37,500 hectares (93,000 acres), or 20% of the total area, had been deforested.

== History ==
=== Formation and later changes ===
The Jaci Paraná Extractive Reserve was created by state governor decree 7.335 of 17 January 1996 with an area of about 205,000 hectares (510,000 acres) as a territorial space for sustainable use and conservation of renewable natural resources. The reserve is classed as IUCN protected area category VI (protected area with sustainable use of natural resources). Law 692 of 27 December 1996 altered the limits of the reserve, which now covered 191,324 hectares (472,770 acres). The State Department of Environmental Development (SEDAM) was to work with the Rondônia Institute of Land and Colonization (ITERON) to implement and manage the reserve. The deliberative council was created on 19 September 2001.

Federal act 105 of 30 June 2004 gave preliminary approval for use of 112,839 hectares (278,830 acres) of federal property, part of the Gleba Capitão Silvio, for implementation of the reserve. State law 633 changed the limits of the reserve to exclude the area occupied by the Serra dos Três Irmãos Ecological Station, Rio Madeira Environmental Protection Area and Rio Vermelho State Forest. It also excluded areas used for the Santo Antônio Hydroelectric Dam. The revised area of the reserve would be 197,364 hectares (487,700 acres).

=== Attempted revocation ===
By 2014 there were about 200 illegal cattle ranches in the reserve, with over 44,000 cattle. On 16 January 2014, owners of cattle in the reserve were given 40 days notice to remove their cattle. In response, state legislative decree 506 of 11 February 2014 revoked decree 7.335 that had created the reserve. The decree to revoke the reserve, and decrees that also revoked the Rio Madeira Environmental Protection Area, Rio Madeira B State Forest and Rio Vermelho State Forest, were opposed by the traditional populations but supported by loggers, ranchers and farmers. Defending the decree, Deputy Ribamar Araújo (PT) said that the only development model that worked for Rondônia was for forest to give way to agriculture and livestock. The decree was supported by 15 of the 16 deputies who attended the session.

The Amazon Working Group, with more than 600 organizations representing farmers, rubber tappers, Indians, maroons, environmental organizations and human rights groups, published an open letter denouncing the state legislative decree. An injunction of 14 April 2014 by the state prosecutor suspended the decree. The state prosecutor noted that the constitution of Brazil gave government and society the duty to protect an ecologically balanced environment. It seemed that the area was being rapidly degraded, which justified fast and efficient measures. The case was tried by the court of Rondônia, which upheld the decision of the state prosecutor on 2 May 2016. The judgement also upheld revocation of decrees that had revoked the Rio Madeira Environmental Protection Area and the Rio Madeira B and Rio Vermelho state forests.

== Sources ==
- Ayres, José Márcio; Da Fonseca, Gustavo A. B.; Rylands, Anthony B.; Queiroz, Helder L.; Pinto, Luiz Paulo; Masterson, Donald; Cavalcanti, Roberto B. (2005), Os Corredores Ecológicos das Florestas Tropicais do Brasil (PDF) (in Portuguese), Sociedade Civil Mamirauá, archived from the original (PDF) on 2016-07-31
- "Fim da Reserva Jaci-Paraná: atraso em Rondônia", Rede Sustentabilidade (in Portuguese), 10 March 2014, archived from the original on 2016-10-30
- "Justiça nega pedido de permanência a produtores rurais na Resex Jaci-Paraná", Amazonia da Gente (in Portuguese), 3 March 2014, archived from the original on 2016-10-30
- "Justiça suspende revogação de Unidades de Conservação em Rondônia", ((o))eco (in Portuguese), 11 May 2016
- Raupp de Matos, Valdir; Almeida, José de, júnior (January 1996), Decreto nº 7335, de 17 de Janeiro de 1996. DOE nº 3432, de 19 de Janeiro de 1996 (PDF) (in Portuguese)
- RESEX Jaci Paraná (in Portuguese), ISA: Instituto Socioambiental
- RESEX Jaci-Paraná (in Portuguese), WWF, archived from the original on 2016-10-30
