= Rio Ouro Preto Biological Reserve =

Biological reserve in Rondônia, Brazil

- Reserva Biológica do Rio Ouro Preto
- IUCN category Ia (strict nature reserve)
- Location within Brazil
- Nearest city: Guajará-Mirim, Rondônia
- Coordinates: 10°54′24″S 64°39′14″W
- Area: 46,438 hectares (114,750 acres)
- Designation: Biological reserve
- Created: 28 March 1990
- Administrator: Secretaria de Estado do Desenvolvimento Ambiental

The Rio Ouro Preto Biological Reserve (Portuguese: Reserva Biológica do Rio Ouro Preto) is a biological reserve in the state of Rondônia, Brazil.

== Location ==
The Rio Ouro Preto Biological Reserve is in the municipality of Guajará-Mirim, Rondônia. It has an area of 46,438 hectares (114,750 acres). The reserve has no inhabitants. It is east of the town of Guajará-Mirim on the Bolivian border. The Ouro Preto River, after which it is named, runs through the Rio Ouro Preto Extractive Reserve to the north. The Rio Ouro Preto Biological Reserve runs along a line of low hills that separate the Rio Ouro Preto Extractive Reserve from the Rio Pacaás Novos Extractive Reserve to the south.

The reserve is in the Pacaás Novos River basin. It is in the pediplain of the centre of western Brazil, with altitudes from 100 to 300 metres (330 to 980 ft) above sea level, in the Amazon biome. Soils include quartz sand, red-yellow podzols and rocky outcrops. The vegetation of the reserve is almost intact. It includes open submontane rainforest (54.82%), dense montane Savana of the Pacaás Novos (16.58%), rainforest-savanna transition (14.52%) and arboreal savanna (5.21%).

== History ==
The Rio Ouro Preto Biological Reserve was created by decree 4.580 of 28 March 1990 with an area of about 46,438 hectares (114,750 acres), administered by the Rondônia Secretariat of State of the Environment (SEMARO). An act of 30 June 2004 gave preliminary approval for assignment of an area of 46,438 hectares (114,750 acres), part of the 1,934,900 hectares (4,781,000 acres) Gleba Samauma, for implementation of the biological reserve. The act included a caveat that the armed forces and federal police had freedom of transit and access to undertake their duties of national security and public law enforcement, including installation of infrastructure such as access roads. The word "State" was added to the unit's title, as "Rio Ouro Preto State Biological Reserve".

== Sources ==
- Maicon Nascimento Araujo (9 February 2011), "Reserva Estadual Rio Ouro Preto- RO", Porto Velho & Sustentabilidade (in Portuguese)
- REBIO do Rio Ouro Preto (in Portuguese), ISA: Instituto Socioambiental
- "Reserva Biológica Rio Ouro Preto", RondoniaRural.com (in Portuguese)
