= Guajará-Mirim State Park =

State park in Rondônia, Brazil

- Parque Estadual de Guajará-Mirim
- IUCN category II (national park)
- Location within Brazil
- Nearest city: Nova Mamoré, Rondônia
- Coordinates: 10.538°S 64.455°W
- Area: 216,568 hectares (535,150 acres).
- Designation: State park
- Created: 23 March 1990
- Administrator: Secretaria de Estado do Desenvolvimento Ambiental

The Guajará-Mirim State Park (Portuguese: Parque Estadual de Guajará-Mirim) is a state park in the state of Rondônia, Brazil. It protects an area of savanna forest and transition into rainforest. It is in an area where there is great pressure from loggers and ranchers. A road was illegally cut through the park, apparently by loggers supported by local politicians. This received federal approval after the fact, since it provides access to areas otherwise cut off by flooding of the Madeira River.

== Location ==
The Guajará-Mirim State Park is divided between the Rondônia municipalities of Nova Mamoré (97.67%) and Guajará-Mirim (2.33%). It has an area of 216,568 hectares (535,150 acres). The BR-421 Federal highway forms part of the northern boundary of the park. To the southwest it adjoins the Rio Ouro Preto Extractive Reserve. To the east it adjoins the Pacaás Novos National Park. There are two support bases on the banks of the Formoso River that are used by researchers and inspection teams. A road crosses the park and areas along the Corrente stream have been deforested, but there are no inhabitants. The conservation unit is supported by the Amazon Region Protected Areas Program. Although much of the park is protected, the surrounding areas of Campo Novo de Rondônia and Buritis are under great pressure.

== Environment ==
The park covers parts of the Guaporé plateau and the southern Amazon depression, with altitudes of 100 to 500 metres (330 to 1,640 ft). The park holds tributaries of the Jaci Paraná River basin. Soils include red-yellow podzols, rocky outcrops, lithic soils and quartz sands. Vegetation is 60% savanna and 12% savanna-rainforest contact. There are estimated to be about 500 species of birds, including some that are threatened elsewhere by hunting. Between 40 and 50 species of amphibians have been recorded, similar to other Amazon regions.

== History ==
The Guajará-Mirim State Park was created by decree 4.575 of 23 March 1990 with an area of about 258,813 hectares (639,540 acres) under the administration of the Instituto Estadual de Florestas of Rondônia. The limits were revised by law 700 of 27 December 1996, with the area reduced to 207,186 hectares (511,970 acres). Clear land titles had been proved for the 53,601 hectares (132,450 acres) that was lost. The limits were again revised by law 1.146 of 12 December 2002, with the area expanded to 216,567 hectares (535,150 acres). The 2002 law excluded 4,906 hectares (12,120 acres) of the northern tip of the park to make way for the federal highway BR-421, which had been opened illegally by ranchers and loggers, but compensated by adding 14,325 hectares (35,400 acres) in the southeast of the park.

A federal injunction in August 2004 required that the responsible agencies prevent acts of environmental degradation in the park. Despite this, an irregular opening of a 14 kilometres (8.7 mi) road from BR-421 was allowed to split the park from east to west and thus segmented the Guaporé-Mamoré ecological corridor. The road was built beside the park headquarters, where the State Environmental Development Secretariat (SEDAM) personnel are installed. Apparently it was funded by loggers supported by senior state politicians. The bridges of that section of BR-421 were built from castanheira wood, and a report from the Brazilian Institute of Environment and Renewable Natural Resources showed that wood had been stolen along the route.

The two cities of Guajará-Mirim and Nova Mamoré were isolated in February 2014 because the BR-425 highway had been flooded by the Igarapé das Araras, a tributary of the Madeira River. President Dilma Rousseff visited the state and supported work to open the road through the park. The road was opened in April 2014 after receiving authorisation from the federal court. The road connecting the municipalities of Buritis and Campo Novo to Nova Mamoré and Guajará-Mirim cut off the northern 10% of the park. Control points were established at the two road entrances, and vehicle traffic between 6:00 p.m. and 6:00 a.m was prohibited, mainly to protect animals crossing the road at night.

In August 2014 it was reported that the Associação de Defesa Etnoambiental Kanindé was to implement a management plan. The Kanindé environmentalist Ivaneide Bandeira noted that the opening of the park road had increased pressure on the park and had been used to transport stolen cars. The plan was to be prepared by involved people, including the environmentalists, park management and local residents. After defining the process, Kanindé would start a full survey of the park's fauna and flora, physical characteristics, socioeconomic factors and so on. In May 2015 deputy Lazinho da Fetagro spoke in the state assembly against the invasion of the state park. He called on the state government and SEDAM to stop the invasion, which was not by landless workers. He said tracks had already been made into the forest and it was clear that logging would soon begin. In January 2016 SEDAM and Kanindé reviewed the protection plan that had been in place since the park was created.

== Sources ==
- Deputado denuncia invasão de Parque Estadual de Guajará Mirim (in Portuguese), A Crítica de Rondônia, 28 May 2015
- "Estrada aberta em Parque Estadual de RO é liberada para o tráfego", G1 Globo (in Portuguese), 9 April 2014
- Full list: PAs supported by ARPA, ARPA
- Parque Estadual Guajará - Mirim (in Portuguese), Via Rural, archived from the original on August 6, 2016
- PES de Guajará-Mirim (in Portuguese), ISA: Instituto Socioambiental
- SEDAM e Kanindé fazem revisão do Plano de proteção do Parque Estadual de Guajará-Mirim (in Portuguese), 2 February 2016
- Vanessa Moura (25 August 2014), "Em Rondônia, Parque Estadual de Guajará-Mirim receberá Plano de Manejo", portalamazonia.com (in Portuguese), archived from the original on 17 August 2016
