= Jamari River =

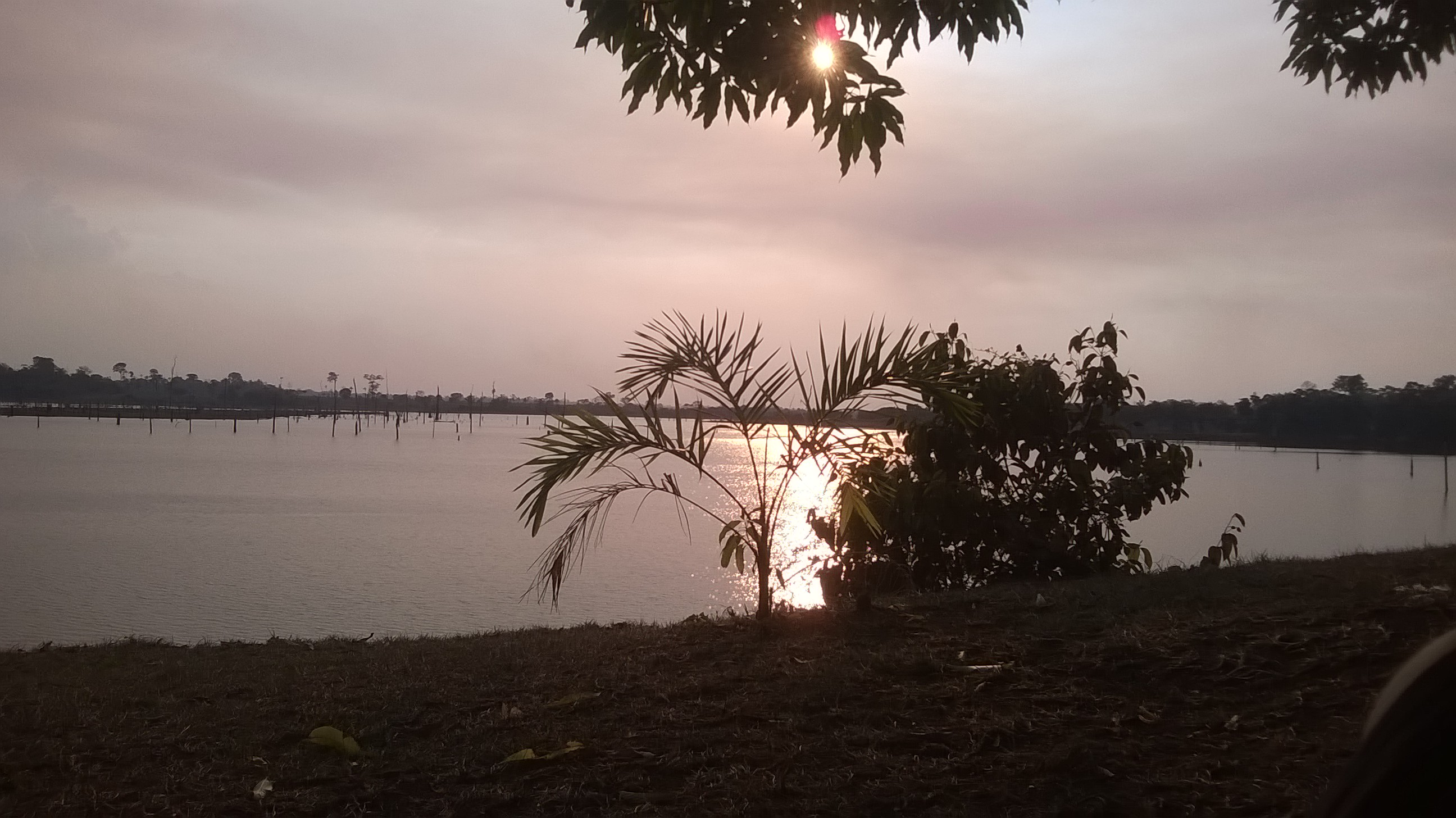
- Jamary river near Itapuã do Oeste.

Location
- Country: Brazil
- State: Rondônia
- City: Itapuã do Oeste

Physical characteristics
- Source: Pacaás Novos mountain range
  - location: Campo Novo de Rondonia, Rondônia, Brazil
  - coordinates: 11°06′00″S 63°19′00″W
  - elevation: 460 m (1,510 ft)
- Mouth: Madeira River
  - location: Porto Velho, Rondônia, Brazil
- Length: 400 km (250 mi)

Basin features
- Tributaries
  - left: Candeias River; Verde River (Jamari River)
  - right: Preto do Crespo River; Guaiamã River; Branco River (Jamari River)

Jamari River (Brazil)

The Jamari River is a river of Rondônia state in western Brazil.

Part of the river's watershed is covered by the 221,218 hectares (546,640 acres) Jacundá National Forest, a sustainable use conservation unit. The Jamari river is dammed by the Samuel Hydroelectric Dam near Porto Velho, which forms a reservoir that covers 56,000 hectares (140,000 acres). The Samuel Ecological Station was established in compensation for the environmental impact. The ecological station extends to the east of the dam and protects part of the Jamari river basin.

== See also ==
- List of rivers of Rondônia
