= Urupá River =

Location
- Country: Brazil

Physical characteristics
- Source
  - location: Pacaás Novos National Park, Rondônia state
- Mouth
  - location: Ji-Paraná
  - coordinates: 10°53′23″S 61°56′50″W

The Urupá River is a river of Rondônia state in western Brazil. It is a left tributary of the Ji-Paraná River.

Its source is in the Pacaás Novos National Park.

== See also ==
- List of rivers of Rondônia
