= Melgaço =

Melgaço may refer to:

- Melgaço, Portugal, a municipality in Portugal
- Melgaço, Pará, a municipality in Pará, Brazil
- Barão de Melgaço, a municipality in Mato Grosso, Brazil
- Barão de Melgaço River in western Brazil
