= List of rivers of Rondônia =

List of rivers in Rondônia (Brazilian State).

The list is arranged by drainage basin, with respective tributaries indented under each larger stream's name and ordered from downstream to upstream. Rondônia is located entirely within the Amazon Basin.

== By Drainage Basin ==
- Amazon River (Pará, Amazonas)
  - Tapajós River (Amazonas)
    - Juruena River (Mato Grosso)
      - Iquê River
  - Madeira River
    - Aripuanã River (Amazonas)
      - Roosevelt River
        - Capitão Cardoso River
          - Tenente Marques River
        - Da Dúvida River
    - Ji-Paraná River (Machado River)
      - Preto River
        - Miriti River
        - Jacundá River
      - Juruazinho River
        - Juruá River
      - Machadinho River
        - Belém River
      - São João River
      - Anari River
      - Jaru River
      - Urupá River
      - Muqui River
        - Palha River
        - Lacerda de Almeida River
        - Acangapiranga River
      - Rolim de Moura River
      - Comemoração River
      - Pimenta Bueno River
        - Uimeerê River
        - São Pedro River
        - Do Ouro River
        - Tanaru River
    - Jamari River
      - Verde River
      - Candeias River
        - Preto de Candeias River
        - Das Garças River
      - Preto do Crespo River
      - Branco River
      - Guaiamã River
        - Quatro Cachoeiras River
        - Pardo River
      - Alto Jamari River
    - Caracol River
    - Jaciparaná River
      - São Francisco River
      - Branco River
      - Formoso River
    - Caripunás River
    - Lourenço River
    - Cutia River
      - Mutumparaná River
    - Abunã River
      - Vermelho River
    - Mamoré River
      - Pacaás Novos River
        - Ouro Preto River
        - Novo River
        - Negro River
      - Sotério River
      - Guaporé River
        - Cautário River
        - São Domingos River
        - Cantarinho River
        - São Miguel River
          - São Francisco River
          - Cabixi River
        - Branco River
        - São Simão River
        - Colorado River
        - Mequéns River
        - Verde River
          - São João River
            - Mequéns River
        - Corumbiara River
        - Escondido River
        - Branco River (Cabixi River)
  - Purus River (Amazonas)
    - Ipixuna River

== Alphabetically ==
- Abunã River
- Acangapiranga River
- Alto Jamari River
- Anari River
- Barão de Melgaço River
- Belém River
- Branco River (Cabixi River)
- Branco River
- Branco River
- Branco River
- Cabixi River
- Candeias River
- Cantarinho River
- Capitão Cardoso River
- Caracol River
- Caripunás River
- Cautário River
- Colorado River
- Comemoração River
- Corumbiara River
- Cutia River
- Da Dúvida River
- Escondido River
- Formoso River
- Das Garças River
- Guaiamã River
- Guaporé River
- Iquê River
- Ipixuna River
- Jaciparaná River
- Jacundá River
- Jamari River
- Jaru River
- Ji-Paraná River (Machado River)
- Juruá River
- Juruazinho River
- Lacerda de Almeida River
- Lourenço River
- Machadinho River
- Madeira River
- Mamoré River
- Mequéns River
- Mequéns River
- Miriti River
- Muqui River
- Mutumparaná River
- Negro River
- Novo River
- Do Ouro River
- Ouro Preto River
- Pacaás Novos River
- Palha River
- Pardo River
- Pimenta Bueno River
- Preto de Candeias River
- Preto do Crespo River
- Preto River
- Quatro Cachoeiras River
- Rolim de Moura River
- Roosevelt River
- São Domingos River
- São Francisco River
- São Francisco River
- São João River
- São João River
- São Miguel River
- São Pedro River
- São Simão River
- Sotério River
- Tanaru River
- Tenente Marques River
- Uimeerê River
- Urupá River
- Verde River
- Verde River
- Vermelho River
