= Samuel Hydroelectric Dam =

- Satellite image. Deforestation (light colour fishbone patterns) is clearly visible

- Location within Brazil
- Official name: Usina Hidrelétrica Samuel
- Country: Brazil
- Location: Rondônia
- Coordinates: 8.751663°S 63.454669°W
- Purpose: Hydroelectric power generation
- Status: Active
- Construction began: April 1982
- Opening date: 24 July 1989
- Owner: Eletrobras Eletronorte

Reservoir
- Active capacity: 3,200,000,000 cubic metres (1.1×10^{11} cu ft)
- Surface area: 560 square kilometres (220 sq mi)
- Maximum length: 40 kilometres (25 mi)
- Maximum width: 20 kilometres (12 mi)
- Normal elevation: 97 metres (318 ft)

Power Station
- Operator: Eletrobras Eletronorte
- Installed capacity: 216 MW
- Capacity factor: 85 MW assured output

The Samuel Hydroelectric Dam (Portuguese: Usina Hidrelétrica Samuel) is a 216 MW hydroelectric dam near Porto Velho, Rondônia, Brazil. The project was controversial since it had a major environmental impact and during operations released more greenhouse gases than a comparable oil-fuelled plant.

== Reservoir ==
The Samuel dam impounds the Jamari River, a right tributary of the Madeira River. It is about 50 kilometres (31 mi) from Porto Velho. The Jamari River originates in the Pacaás Novos Mountains to the south at an altitude of about 500 metres (1,600 ft). The catchment area is just 15,280 square kilometres (5,900 sq mi), or 24 times the area of the reservoir. The river delivers an annual flow of 366 cubic metres (12,900 cu ft) per second.

The dam contains a volume of 3,200,000,000 cubic metres (1.1×10^{11} cu ft) and covers 560 square kilometres (220 sq mi) at normal maximum level of 97 metres (318 ft) above sea level. The main reservoir is 25 kilometres (16 mi) long by 15 to 20 kilometres (9.3 to 12.4 mi) wide, and extends further to the south for another 15 kilometres (9.3 mi) with a width of 3 to 1 kilometre (1.86 to 0.62 mi). Since the terrain is relatively flat, 57 kilometres (35 mi) of dikes were built along the right and left banks to hold the water.

== Construction ==
Construction began towards the end of a period of military dictatorship, during the abertura transition to democracy. The governor of the federal territory of Rondônia was the army colonel Jorge Teixeira. Teixerira was a strong promoter of development in Rondônia. The hydroelectric project was linked to the 1982 POLONOROESTE project funded by the World Bank that rebuilt and paved the BR-364 highway and opened Rondônia to a flood of migrants from the state of Paraná. The road project caused a surge of deforestation and had a large impact on the indigenous people. In 1987 the World Bank President, Barber Conable, called the road project "a sobering example of an environmentally sound effort which went wrong."

Construction started in April 1982. 238 farming families were relocated. A 1981 World Bank report noted that a large amount of fine timber would have to be removed. This could easily be done using the nearby paved road from Ariquemes to Porto Velho, then via Manaus and Santarém to the overseas markets. The report recommended that the IBDF take an inventory and develop a marketing strategy as soon as possible. The first of five turbines was installed on 24 July 1989 and the last on 2 August 1996. The installed capacity is 216 MW. Cost excluding transmission was US$965 million. With an area / capacity ratio of 2.59 km2/MW the dam compares poorly to most other hydroelectric power plants in the Amazon Region other than Curuá-Una at 2.60 and Balbina at 9.44.

== Operations ==
By 1990, a year after starting operation, the power station provided 36% of Rondônia's electricity. This had risen to 58% by 1996. The number of households in the state with electricity rose from 40,419 in 1983 to 132,157 in 1990. The Samuel power plant was initially designed to supply the cities of Guajará-Mirim, Ariquemes, Ji-Paraná, Pimenta Bueno, Vilhena, Abunã and the capital, Porto Velho. On 20 November 2002 Rio Branco, the capital of Acre, was connected to the plant.

In 2009 the Samuel plant delivered 910,889 MWh to the Acre-Rondônia grid, a monthly average of 103.98 MW. The assured output of the plant is about 85 MW, but the higher amount was made possible by unusually high rainfall and availability of all five generating units. As of 2016 electricity was being delivered from the plant to 90% of the municipalities of Rondônia. Eletrobras Eletronorte also operates the 90 MW Rio Madeira thermal power plant. When independent producers are included Eletrobras Eletronorte has a total installed capacity of 403 MW.

In September 2015 the 11th Annual Fishing Tournament was held on the reservoir, attended by fishermen from Rondônia, Acre and Mato Grosso states. More than R$30,000 in prizes were awarded. On 18 March 2016 a large group of protesters blocked the BR-364 highway in Candeias do Jamari. They were demanding a meeting with the state government and city council to address compensation that had not yet been paid to families affected by the Samuel hydroelectric plant.

== Environmental impact ==
Efforts were made to save land animals when the reservoir started filling. The value of the well-publicized $US30 million rescue operation was questionable, since relatively small numbers of the total animal population were rescued. These were released at the lake edge where they caused critical overpopulation. To compensate for the loss of forest by flooding the 56,000 hectares (140,000 acres) reservoir Eletronorte created the 21,000 hectares (52,000 acres) Samuel Ecological Station to the east of the reservoir's embankment about 26 kilometres (16 mi) from the dam. On 29 December 1997 the station's limits were extended to an area of 71,061 hectares (175,600 acres). The Ecological Station covers a large part of the reservoir, and extends to the east.

Almost all of the reservoir area was covered in tropical forest before the dam was built. Although not required by law, Eletronorte conducted a series of environmental studies, but these were later criticized for lack of depth and objectivity. It has been noted that the region was undergoing rapid deforestation when the dam was built, so the area now covered by the dam would probably otherwise be covered by degraded cattle pasture, as is the case in neighbouring areas. However, an exception to the Brazilian law prohibiting export of logs was created for Samuel, and this caused a boom in illegal logging throughout the western Amazon basin. Satellite images from 1984 and 2011 show a dramatic expansion of deforestation in the areas to the north, west and south of the dam.

The dam emits more greenhouse gas than an oil-fuelled power plant with the same capacity would emit. In 1990 the reservoir emitted 11.6 times more greenhouse gases than an oil-burning plant would have given off making the same amount of energy. This has since declined to a stable level of 2.6 times higher than the fossil fuel alternative.

The reservoir methylated mercury present in the soil, contaminating fish. Fish populations were studied before and after the dam was built. They showed a drop in diversity, but an increase in the populations of species that included Cichla sp. (tucunare), Schizodon fasciatus (aracu comum), Hypophthalmus marginatus (mapará) and Serrasalmus rhombeus (piranha preta). The reservoir is now used intensively for fishing, which in the past had been confined to the mouth of the river, causing concerns about sustainability.

== Sources ==
- "Atingidos por usina hidrelétrica de Samuel fecham BR-364 em Rondônia", Giro Central (in Portuguese), 18 March 2016
- Browder, John O.; Godfrey, Brian J. (1997), Rainforest Cities: Urbanization, Development, and Globalization of the Brazilian Amazon, Columbia University Press, ISBN 978-0-231-10655-9
- Eletrobras Eletronorte, "Estação Ecológica de Samuel", Unidade de Conservação (in Portuguese), archived from the original on 2016-06-13
- Fearnside, Philip M. (January 2005), "Brazil's Samuel Dam: lessons for hydroelectric development policy and the environment in Amazonia.", Environ Manage, 35 (1), National Institute for Research in the Amazon: 1–19, doi:10.1007/s00267-004-0100-3, PMID 15984060, S2CID 25498848
- Fearnside, Philip M. (22 March 2004), A HIDRELÉTRICA DE SAMUEL: LIÇÕES PARA AS POLÍTICAS DE DESENVOLVIMENTO ENERGÉTICO E AMBIENTAL NA AMAZÔNIA, Instituto Nacional de Pesquisas da Amazônia (INPA)
- Laubenbacher Sampaio, Lilian (24–25 April 2013), The gathered best practices (lato-sensu) regarding the installation of large hydropower enterprises in the Amazon rainforest region (PDF), Tolyatti
- Lemos de Sá, Rosa Maria (1995), Effects of the Samuel Hydroelectric Dam on mammal and bird communities in a heterogeneous Amazonian lowland forest, Gainesville, FL.: University of Florida, George A. Smathers Libraries
- Projects Department (30 October 1981), Report No. 3512b-BR, World Bank
- Robson Damasceno (29 July 2015), ESTAÇÃO ECOLÓGICA SAMUEL - REUNIÃO DEBATE CRIAÇÃO DO CONSELHO, Rondonia Secretaria de Estado do Desenvolvimento Ambiental, archived from the original on 17 June 2016
- Rondônia (in Portuguese), Eletrobras Eletronorte
- Samuel Estação Ecológica (in Portuguese), ISA: Instituto Socioambiental
- Santos, Geraldo Mendes dos (1995), "Impacts of the Samuel Hydroelectric Dam on the Fish Communities of the Jamari River, in Rondônia, Brazil", Acta Amazonica, 25 (3–4), Manaus, ISSN 1809-4392
- Silvius, Kirsten M.; Bodmer, Richard E.; Fragoso, Jos M. V. (2012-05-29), People in Nature: Wildlife Conservation in South and Central America, Columbia University Press, ISBN 978-0-231-50208-5
- "Torneio de Pesca Amadora no Lago da Usina Hidrelétrica Samuel chega a sua 11ª Edição", O Melhor de Rondônia (in Portuguese), 26 September 2015
- "Usina Hidrelétrica Samuel registrou maior recorde de geração de energia em 2009", Rondoniaovivo.com, 26 January 2010
