= Tenente Marques River =

Coordinates: 11°07′S 59°59′W

- Location within Brazil

Location
- Country: Brazil

Physical characteristics
- Source
  - location: Rondônia state
- Mouth
  - location: Capitão Cardoso River

The Tenente Marques River is a river of Rondônia and Mato Grosso states in western Brazil.

It was initially known as the Ananaz River, which was named by Cândido Rondon after a pineapple field that had encountered while exploring the area, but was later named after the explorer Tenente Marques after his death.

== See also ==
- List of rivers of Rondônia
- List of rivers of Mato Grosso
