= Samauma =

Samauma (in Brazil, or samahuma in Peru) may refer to:

- Ceiba pentandra
- Ceiba samauma
- Samaúma (or sumaúma), the fibre obtained from the fruit of the above tree species

== See also ==
- Gleba Samaúma in Guajará-Mirim municipality, western Rondônia, Brazil
