= Rio Vermelho State Forest =

State forest in Rondônia, Brazil

- Floresta Estadual de Rendimento Sustentado Rio Vermelho
- IUCN category VI (protected area with sustainable use of natural resources)
- Location within Brazil
- Nearest city: Porto Velho, Rondônia
- Coordinates: 9°27′13″S 64°59′56″W
- Designation: State forest
- Created: 1990

The Rio Vermelho State Forest (Portuguese: Floresta Estadual de Rendimento Sustentado Rio Vermelho) is a state forest in the state of Rondônia, Brazil. There are two parts, designated "A" and "B", originally with about 190,000 hectares (470,000 acres) in total. Both were later reduced in size, with parts allocated to other conservation units. The status of the forest has been the subject of extended negotiations between the state and the federal government related to the Jirau hydroelectric plant and the illegal occupation of the Bom Futuro National Forest. It was incorporated in the Mapinguari National Park in 2010, but that has been appealed.

== Early history ==
The Rio Vermelho "A" State Forest was created by state decree in 1990 with an area of 38,680 hectares (95,600 acres). The forest was not demarcated and no management plan was created. Part of it was incorporated into the Serra dos Três Irmãos Ecological Station. The Rio Vermelho "B" State Forest was created by state decree in 1990 with 152,000 hectares (380,000 acres). It was to have been a pilot project for forest management under the World Bank's PLANAFLORO program. However, only 31,570 hectares (78,000 acres) were demarcated in 1995 to receive World Bank funds. In 1996 some of the remaining area was included in the Mujica Nava Ecological Station. A large part of the state forest was converted into agricultural zones. The Rio Vermelho state forests were on land that is still owned by the federal government, and has never been transferred to the state.

== Jirau hydroelectric plant negotiations ==
In June 2009 the state of Rondônia and the federal government agreed to break up the 272,000 hectares (670,000 acres) Bom Futuro National Forest into three parts: a 70,000 hectares (170,000 acres) environmental protection area, a 70,000 hectares (170,000 acres) state forest and a 132,000 hectares (330,000 acres) federal protected area to be run by the federal Chico Mendes Institute for Biodiversity Conservation (ICMBio). This would recognize the de facto occupation of much of the national park by squatters. The state would also transfer the Rio Vermelho A and B state forest and the Serra dos Três Irmãos and Mujica Nava ecological stations to the federal union to create a fully protected federal unit of 180,000 hectares (440,000 acres). The deal was related to the state agreeing to allow the Jirau hydroelectric plant to proceed.

State governor decree 14405 of 16 July 2009 established a special commission to study the social and environmental impacts of the uncontrolled occupation of the Bom Futuro National Forest, to monitor the process of releasing land from the national forest, and to study the transfer of the Rio Vermelho forest and the ecological stations to ICMBio. In August 2009 the Federal Public Ministry and the Public Ministry of the State of Rondonia asked the Federal Court set aside the agreement. They argued that the agreement was purely political, and would cause further environmental damage.

Federal law 12.249 of 2010 altered the boundaries of forest areas in Rondônia. The Bom Futuro National Forest was reduced in size from 280,000 to 97,000 hectares (690,000 to 240,000 acres), with the excluded areas transferred to the state of Rondônia. In return, the state government would withdraw objections to environmental licensing of the Jirau hydroelectric plant, which would flood 400 to 1,000 hectares (990 to 2,470 acres) of the Rio Vermelho forest. The Rio Vermelho A and B State Forest and the Serra dos Três Irmãos and Mujica Nava ecological stations, totalling about 180,000 hectares (440,000 acres) would be transferred to ICMBio. The boundaries of the Mapinguari National Park were modified by law 12249 of 11 June 2010 which added about 180,900 hectares (447,000 acres) but excluded the area that would be flooded by the Jirau Dam to create the reservoir for the Jirau Hydroelectric Power Plant.

In July 2013 the Attorney General again challenged this law on the basis of unconstitutionality. On 16 January 2014 owners of cattle in the Jaci Paraná Extractive Reserve were given 40 days notice to remove their cattle. In response, state legislative decree 506 of 11 February 2014 revoked the reserve. This decree, and decrees that also revoked the Rio Madeira Environmental Protection Area, Rio Madeira B State Forest and Rio Vermelho State Forest, were opposed by the traditional populations but supported by loggers, ranchers and farmers. An injunction of 14 April 2014 by the state prosecutor suspended the decree. The case was tried by the court of Rondônia, which upheld the decision of the state prosecutor on 2 May 2016. The judgement also upheld revocation of decrees that had revoked the Rio Madeira Environmental Protection Area and the Rio Madeira B and Rio Vermelho state forests.

== Sources ==
- Dennis Barbosa (22 August 2009), "MP entra com ação contra acordo sobre floresta nacional devastada em RO", G1 Globo
- Ivo Narciso Cassol (16 July 2009), Decreto n° 14405 de 16 Julho de 2009 (PDF) (in Portuguese)
- "Justiça suspende revogação de Unidades de Conservação em Rondônia", ((o))eco (in Portuguese), 11 May 2016
- PARNA Mapinguari (in Portuguese), ISA: Instituto Socioambiental
- PGR questiona alteração de áreas florestais em Rondônia (in Portuguese), STF: Supremo Tribunal Federal, 15 July 2013
- RESEX Jaci Paraná (in Portuguese), ISA: Instituto Socioambiental
- Telma Monteiro (14 June 2009), Troca Indecente (in Portuguese)
