= Belém River =

Belém River may refer to:

- Belém River (Paraná), in Brazil
- Belém River (Rondônia), in Brazil
