= Mujica Nava Ecological Station =

- Estação Ecológica Antônio Mujica Nava
- IUCN category Ia (strict nature reserve)
- Location within Brazil
- Nearest city: Porto Velho, Rondônia
- Coordinates: 9°26′20″S 64°57′58″W
- Area: 18,281 hectares (45,170 acres)
- Designation: Ecological station
- Created: 7 November 1996
- Administrator: SEDAM

The Mujica Nava Ecological Station (Portuguese: Estação Ecológica Antônio Mujica Nava is (or was) an ecological station in the state of Rondônia, Brazil. In 2010 it was incorporated into the Mapinguari National Park, but this decision was later challenged.

== Location ==
The Mujica Nava Ecological Station (ESEC) is in the municipality of Porto Velho, Rondônia, and was created with an area of 18,280.85 hectares (45,173.0 acres). It adjoins the border with the state of Amazonas and the Serra dos Três Irmãos Ecological Station. It is drained by tributaries of the Madeira River. Altitudes range from 100 to 200 metres (330 to 660 ft). It has similar fauna and flora to the neighboring Serra dos Três Irmãos ESEC. The ESEC is almost entirely covered by open submontane rainforest.

== History ==
The Antônio Mujica Nava Ecological Station was created by state governor decree 7635 of 7 November 1996 to be administered by SEDAM, the State Secretariat for Environmental Development. Some of the Rio Vermelho State Forest was included in the Mujica Nava Ecological Station. It is classed as IUCN protected area category Ia (strict nature reserve).

The boundaries of the Mapinguari National Park were modified by law 12249 of 11 June 2010 which added about 180,900 hectares (447,000 acres) but excluded the area that would be flooded by the Jirau Dam to create the reservoir for the Jirau Hydroelectric Power Plant. The added land had formerly been state conservation units, the Rio Vermelho State Forest (A and B), the Antônio Mugica Nava Ecological Station and part of the Serra dos Três Irmãos Ecological Station. Law 12249 was challenged in July 2013 by the federal Attorney General on the basis of unconstitutionality. This was followed by moves by the state legislature to annul creation of the state conservation units, which were in turn overturned.

== Sources ==
- EE Antônio Mujica Nava (in Portuguese), WWF
- "Estação Ecológica Estadual Antônio Mujica Nava- RO", Porto Velho & Sustentabilidade (in Portuguese), 11 September 2011
- "Justiça suspende revogação de Unidades de Conservação em Rondônia", ((o))eco (in Portuguese), 11 May 2016
- PARNA Mapinguari (in Portuguese), ISA: Instituto Socioambiental
- PGR questiona alteração de áreas florestais em Rondônia (in Portuguese), STF: Supremo Tribunal Federal, 15 July 2013
- Raupp de Matos, Valdir; Almeida, José, junior (7 November 1996), Decreto n.º 7635 de 07 de Novembro de 1996 (in Portuguese)
- RESEX Jaci Paraná (in Portuguese), ISA: Instituto Socioambiental
- Telma Monteiro (14 June 2009), Troca Indecente (in Portuguese)
