= Rio Verde (Jamari River tributary) =

- Rio Verde (Jamari River tributary) (Brazil)

Location
- Country: Brazil

Physical characteristics
- Source
  - location: Rondônia state
  - coordinates: 8.521333°S 63.456135°W

Basin features
- River system: Jamari River

The Rio Verde (Portuguese for "green river") is a river of Rondônia state in western Brazil. It is a tributary of the Jamari River.

Part of the river's watershed is covered by the 221,218 hectares (546,640 acres) Jacundá National Forest, a sustainable use conservation unit.

== See also ==
- List of rivers of Rondônia
