= Caracol River (Rondônia) =

Location
- Country: Brazil

Physical characteristics
- Source
  - location: Rondônia state
- Mouth
  - coordinates: 9°11′S 64°23′W

The Caracol River is a river of Rondônia state in western Brazil.

== See also ==
- List of rivers of Rondônia
