= Jacundá National Forest =

National forest in Rondônia, Brazil

- Floresta Nacional de Jacundá
- IUCN category VI (protected area with sustainable use of natural resources)
- Location within Brazil
- Nearest city: Porto Velho, Rondônia Brazil
- Coordinates: 8.409°S 63.027°W
- Area: 221,218 hectares (546,640 acres)
- Designation: National forest
- Created: 1 December 2004
- Administrator: ICMBio

The Jacundá National Forest (Portuguese: Floresta Nacional de Jacundá) is a sustainable-use national forest in the state of Rondônia, Brazil.

== Location ==
The Jacundá National Forest is in the Amazonia biome and covers 221,218 hectares (546,640 acres). The forest covers parts of the municipalities of Candeias do Jamari and Porto Velho in the state of Rondônia. The Samuel Ecological Station, a state-managed unit, lies to the south of the forest. Altitude ranges from 100 to 150 metres (330 to 490 ft). The terrain is mainly the floodplains of the large and small rivers, surrounded by fluvial terraces. The forest is bordered by the Madeira River and its right-bank tributaries the Jamari and the Ji-Paraná or Machado River. The Jacundá, Miriti, Preto and Verde rivers are fed by springs in the forest.

Temperatures range from 18 to 32 °C (64 to 90 °F) with an average of 26 °C (79 °F). Average annual rainfall is 2,250 millimetres (89 in). There are three dominant vegetation types including at least 285 tree species in 55 botanical families. Most of the area is covered by open rainforest, with smaller areas of dense rainforest and savannah, the last of which have little commercial value. Migratory birds include black-tailed tityra (Tityra cayana), nacunda nighthawk (Chordeiles nacunda), band-rumped swift (Chaetura spinicaudus), fork-tailed flycatcher (Tyrannus savana), solitary sandpiper (Tringa solitaria), vermilion flycatcher (Pyrocephalus rubinus) and purple martin (Progne subis).

== Conservation ==
The Jacundá National Forest was created on 1 December 2004 and is managed by the federal Chico Mendes Institute for Biodiversity Conservation (ICMBio). It is classed as IUCN protected area category VI (protected area with sustainable use of natural resources). The purpose is to allow sustainable use of forest resources and scientific research, with emphasis on sustainable exploitation of native forests. The 2009 annual plan authorized using 112,000 hectares (280,000 acres) for forestry.

The Cuniã-Jacundá Integrated Management (GICJ: Gestão Integrada Cuniã-Jacundá) is a proposed management organization that would take responsibility for three federal conservation units in Rondônia, the Cuniã Ecological Station, Jacunda National Forest and Lago do Cuniã extractive reserve. All three are managed by ICMBio and have complementary objectives in maintaining a total of 408,000 hectares (1,010,000 acres) of Amazon biome and its transition to savannah.

== Sources ==
- Denis Helena Rivas, "Gestão Integrada Cuniã", PPBIO/CENBAM (in Portuguese)
- Floresta Nacional de Jacundá (in Portuguese), Chico Mendes Institute for Biodiversity Conservation, archived from the original on August 11, 2016
- Floresta Nacional de Jacundá (in Portuguese), Serviço Florestal Brasileiro, archived from the original on 2016-06-24
- Robson Damasceno (29 July 2015), ESTAÇÃO ECOLÓGICA SAMUEL - REUNIÃO DEBATE CRIAÇÃO DO CONSELHO, Rondonia Secretaria de Estado do Desenvolvimento Ambiental, archived from the original on 17 June 2016
- Unidade de Conservação: Floresta Nacional de Jacundá (in Portuguese), MMA: Ministério do Meio Ambiente
