= São Miguel River (Rondônia) =

Location
- Country: Brazil

Physical characteristics
- Source
  - location: Rondônia state
- Mouth
  - coordinates: 12°30′S 63°33′W

The São Miguel River is a river of Rondônia state in western Brazil. It is a tributary of the Guaporé River.

== See also ==
- List of rivers of Rondônia
