= Rio Ouro Preto Extractive Reserve =

Extractive reserve in Rondônia, Brazil

- Reserva Extrativista Rio Ouro Preto
- IUCN category VI (protected area with sustainable use of natural resources)
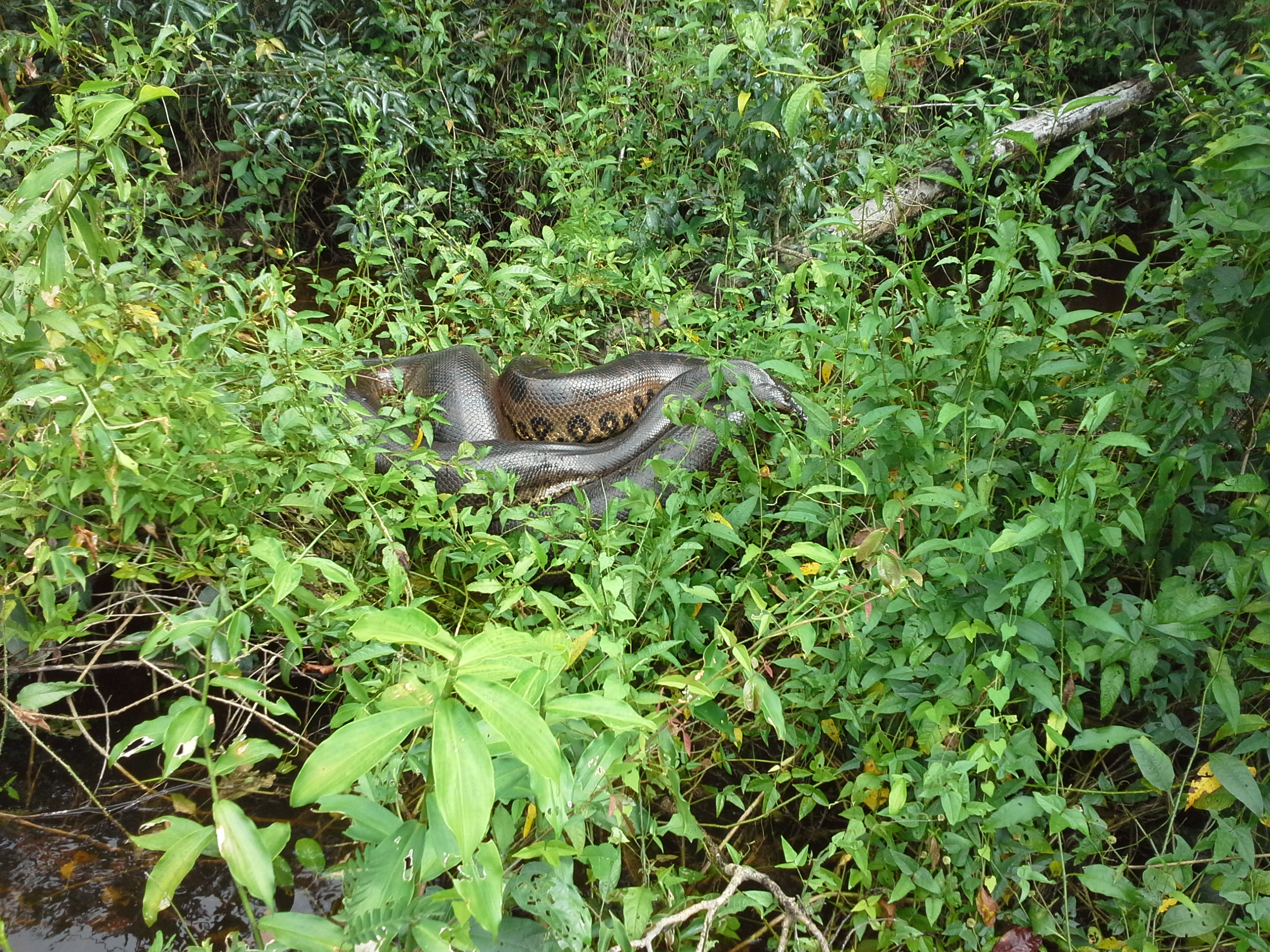
- Green anaconda about 6 metres (20 ft), in the Rio Ouro Preto Extractive Reserve

- Location within Brazil
- Location: Rondônia, Brazil
- Coordinates: 10°45′27″S 64°41′49″W
- Area: 204,631.55 hectares (505,655.6 acres)
- Designation: Extractive reserve
- Administrator: Chico Mendes Institute for Biodiversity Conservation

The Rio Ouro Preto Extractive Reserve (Portuguese: Reserva Extrativista Rio Ouro Preto) is an extractive reserve in the state of Rondônia, Brazil. Created in 1990, it was one of the first such reserves in Brazil. The residents extract rubber, nuts and other products in the dry season and farm or work outside the reserve in the rainy season, when large areas are flooded. Houses are built on stilts to avoid flooding and discourage animals from entering.

== Location ==
The Rio Ouro Preto Extractive Reserve is divided between the municipalities of Guajará-Mirim (73.45%) and Nova Mamoré (26.55%) in Rondônia. It has an area of 204,631.55 hectares (505,655.6 acres). The BR-421 federal highway runs east from the town of Guajará-Mirim on the Bolivian border, and enters the north part of the reserve.

The reserve occupies the basin of the Ouro Preto River between two parallel east-west ranges of hills. It extends westward along the course of the Ouro Preto to where it joins the Pacaás Novos River, which forms the western boundary of the reserve. Altitudes range from 147 to 235 metres (482 to 771 ft) above sea level.

The reserve is part of the largest block of environmentally protected land in the state, and forms a buffer between the cleared and farmed areas and the strictly protected forest areas. The Guajará-Mirim State Park lies to the north of the eastern part of the extractive reserve, the Rio Ouro Preto Biological Reserve lies in the hills to the south of the eastern part, and the Rio Pacaás Novos Extractive Reserve lies to the south of the western part.

== History ==
The Rio Ouro Preto Extractive Reserve was created by decree 99.166 of 13 March 1990. It is administered by the federal Chico Mendes Institute for Biodiversity Conservation (ICMBio). The reserve is classified as IUCN protected area category VI (protected area with sustainable use of natural resources). The extractive reserve is used by the traditional populations who live by extraction of forest products as well as subsistence agriculture and small-scale animal husbandry, It protects their livelihood and culture while ensuring sustainable use of the natural resources. The Rio Ouro Preto reserve was one of the first four such units to be created in Brazil.

On 5 September 2003 the Instituto Nacional de Colonização e Reforma Agrária recognised that the reserve had the capacity for 109 families with access to PRONAF support. This was adjusted more than once, rising to 178 families on 16 October 2006. The deliberative council was created on 22 November 2006. In December 2010 the Association of Rubber Tappers and Agro-Extractivists was recognised as controlling the reserve. The usage plan was approved on 19 February 2013, and the management plan was approved on 20 August 2014. The conservation unit is supported by the Amazon Region Protected Areas Program.

== Environment ==
The reserve has varied relief with many springs, rivers and bayous. Average annual rainfall is 2,200 millimetres (87 in). The Ouro Preto water levels vary by over 3 metres (9.8 ft) between the lowest level in September-October and the highest level in the middle of the rainy season in March. In the rainy season the river spills over its banks and floods the forest with dark water due to suspended organic matter. In the dry season it retreats between its banks and takes a greenish color. Navigation by larger vessels become difficult.

Temperatures range from 21 to 32 °C (70 to 90 °F) with an average of 25 °C (77 °F). Vegetation includes open forest, open forest with palms, pioneer dry land and flooded forest and open arboreal savanna. Most of the soils have low agricultural potential apart from some areas of rich black earth that were created by pre-colonial indigenous farmers. There is great biodiversity, with the greatest number of bird species in the state. The most economically valuable plants species are the Itaúba, Maçaranduba, Sorva, Caucho, Copaiba, Seringueira and Castanheira.

== Economy ==
The reserve is home to about 500 people. Houses are built on stilts, both to protect against flooding and to prevent entry of animals. The walls and floors are made of paxiúba (Socratea exorrhiza) palms and the roofs are thatched. Rubber extraction provides half the monthly income of each family. Agriculture is the next most valuable activity, followed by animal husbandry, hunting and fishing.

Rubber is collected and processed in the summer months from July to December, mainly from the Hevea brasiliensis and the Hevea benthamiana. Brazil nuts are mainly collected from December to February. There are few areas of unflooded land near the rubber allotments, but these are planted with maize, rice, beans and other crops. Some families have "rubber paths" in one place and a winter residence in another, with a garden. Others move to the cities, mainly Guajará-Mirim, for temporary jobs in the summer.

== Sources ==
- Full list: PAs supported by ARPA, ARPA
- Resex Rio Ouro Preto (in Portuguese), Chico Mendes Institute for Biodiversity Conservation
- RESEX do Rio Ouro Preto (in Portuguese), ISA: Instituto Socioambiental
- Unidade de Conservação: Reserva Extrativista Rio Ouro Preto (in Portuguese), MMA: Ministério do Meio Ambiente
