= Alta Floresta d'Oeste =

Municipality in Rondônia, Brazil

- Municipality
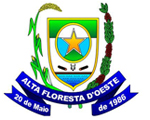
- Flag Coat of arms

- Location in Rondônia state

- Location in Brazil
- Coordinates: 11°58′5″S 61°57′15″W
- Country: Brazil
- Region: North
- State: Rondônia

Area
  - Total: 7,067 km^{2} (2,729 sq mi)

Population (2020)
  - Total: 22,728
  - Density: 3.216/km^{2} (8.330/sq mi)
- Time zone: UTC−4 (AMT)

Alta Floresta d'Oeste (Brazilian Portuguese: [ˈawtɐ floˈɾɛstɐ doˈɛstʃi]) is a municipality located in the Brazilian state of Rondônia. Its population was 22,728 (2020) and its area is 7,067 km^{2}.

It holds part of the 615,771 hectares (1,521,600 acres) Guaporé Biological Reserve, a strictly protected conservation unit.

== See also ==
- List of municipalities in Rondônia
