= Samuel Ecological Station =

Ecological Station

- Estação Ecológica Samuel
- IUCN category Ia (strict nature reserve)
- Location within Brazil
- Nearest city: Porto Velho, Rondônia
- Coordinates: 8°55′30″S 63°03′00″W
- Area: 71,161 hectares (175,840 acres)
- Designation: Ecological station
- Created: 1989
- Administrator: State Department of Environmental Development

The Samuel Ecological Station (Portuguese: Estação Ecológica Samuel) is a strictly protected ecological station in the state of Rondônia, Brazil. It contains a tract of Amazon rainforest that extends east from the reservoir formed by the Samuel Hydroelectric Dam.

== Location ==
The Samuel State Ecological Station is in the northern portion of the state of Rondonia. It covers part of the Jamari River basin and a large part of the reservoir of the Samuel Hydroelectric Dam. The conservation unit extends the east from this reservoir. It is bounded to the north by the Jequitibá Forestry Settlement Project (Projeto de Assentamento Florestal), to the north and east by the Jacundá National Forest and to the south by the Jamari National Forest. The unit lies in the municipalities of Candeias do Jamari (76%) and Itapuã do Oeste (24%).

== Environment ==
The Samuel State Ecological Station lies in the lower plateau of the western Amazonia, with altitudes from 70 to 200 metres (230 to 660 ft) above sea level. The conservation unit is completely covered with open rainforest of the Amazon biome. The unit has diverse flora, with up to 200 species of trees per hectare. Palm trees dominate the upper strata of poorly drained areas. There are typical lowland forests in the flooded areas and along streams adapted to flood periods of up to eight months.

== Conservation ==
The Samuel Ecological Station was created as a form of compensation for the environmental impact of the Eletronorte's Samuel hydroelectric project, whose reservoir covers 56,000 hectares (140,000 acres). The ecological station was created by decree on 18 July 1989 with an area of 20,865 hectares (51,560 acres). On 29 December 1997 the station's limits were defined with an area of 71,061 hectares (175,600 acres).

The station has been threatened by illegal logging. The Rondonia Environmental agency Secretaria de Estado do Desenvolvimento Ambiental (SEDAM) signed an agreement with Eletronorte in 2013 for mutual cooperation in protection and conservation actions for the Samuel station, without transfer of funds. On 2015 an advisory council was formed with members from government and non-government institutions of the Candeias do Jamari and Itapuã d'Oeste municipalities, Vila Nova Samuel and the Jequitibá PAF farmers association.

== Sources ==
- Amazon Biome: protected areas: Coordinated audit, Brasília: Federal Court of Accounts of Brazil, 2014
- Eletrobras Eletronorte, "Estação Ecológica de Samuel", Unidade de Conservação (in Portuguese), archived from the original on 2016-06-13
- Estação Ecológica Samuel (in Portuguese), Via Rural, archived from the original on May 30, 2016
- "Polícia Ambiental evita danos a Estação Ecológica Samuel", Rondoniaovivo.com (in Portuguese), 17 January 2008
- Robson Damasceno (29 July 2015), ESTAÇÃO ECOLÓGICA SAMUEL - REUNIÃO DEBATE CRIAÇÃO DO CONSELHO, Rondonia Secretaria de Estado do Desenvolvimento Ambiental, archived from the original on 17 June 2016
- Samuel Estação Ecológica (in Portuguese), ISA: Instituto Socioambiental
