= Tanaru River =

Coordinates: 12°29′43″S 61°02′51″W

Location
- Country: Brazil

Physical characteristics
- Source
  - location: Rondônia state

The Tanaru River is a river in the Rondônia state in western Brazil.

== See also ==
- List of rivers of Rondônia
- Tanaru Indigenous Territory
