= São Simão River =

River in Rondônia, Brazil

Location
- Country: Brazil

Physical characteristics
- Source
  - location: Rondônia state
- Mouth
  - coordinates: 12°39′S 63°5′W

The São Simão River is a river of Rondônia state in western Brazil.

== See also ==
- List of rivers of Rondônia
