= Formoso River (Rondônia) =

- Location within Brazil
- Native name: Rio Formoso (Portuguese)

Location
- Country: Brazil

Physical characteristics
- Source
  - location: Rondônia state
- Mouth
  - coordinates: 9.895884°S 64.318890°W

Basin features
- River system: Jaci Paraná River

The Formoso River (Portuguese: Rio Formoso) is a river of Rondônia state in western Brazil. It is a tributary of the Jaci Paraná River.

In its upper reaches the Formoso River defines the western boundary of the Guajará-Mirim State Park. The park has two support bases on the banks of the Formoso River that are used by researchers and inspection teams.

== See also ==
- List of rivers of Rondônia

== Sources ==
- PES de Guajará-Mirim (in Portuguese), ISA: Instituto Socioambiental
