= Pacaás Novos River =

- Location within Brazil
- Native name: Rio Pacaás Novos (Portuguese)

Location
- Country: Brazil

Physical characteristics
- Source
  - location: Rondônia state
  - coordinates: 10.848682°S 63.632671°W
- Mouth
  - coordinates: 10.858306°S 65.277607°W

Basin features
- River system: Mamoré River
- Tributaries
  - right: Ouro Preto River

The Pacaás Novos River (Portuguese: Rio Pacaás Novos) is a river of Rondônia state in western Brazil. It is a tributary of the Mamoré River, which it joins from the right just above Guajará-Mirim.

The Pacaás Novos River rises in the mountains in the west of the Pacaás Novos National Park and flows west from there through the Rio Pacaás Novos Extractive Reserve. The Ouro Preto River, a right tributary that flows from the east through the Rio Ouro Preto Extractive Reserve, joins the Pacaás Novos River on the west boundary of the reserve, which is defined by this section of the Pacaás Novos.

== See also ==
- List of rivers of Rondônia

== Sources ==
- PARNA Pacaás Novos (in Portuguese), ISA: Instituto Socioambiental
- RESEX do Rio Ouro Preto (in Portuguese), ISA: Instituto Socioambiental
