= Cutia River =

Location
- Country: Brazil
- State: Rondônia

Physical characteristics
- Mouth: Mutumparaná River
  - coordinates: 9°42′S 64°59′W
- Length: 65 km (40 mi)

The Cutia River is a river in Rondônia, western Brazil. It is approximately 65 km (40 mi) long and flows from south to north into the Mutumparaná River.

== See also ==
- List of rivers of Rondônia
