= Nova Mamoré =

Municipality in Rondônia, Brazil

- Municipality
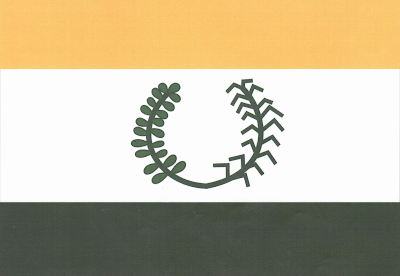
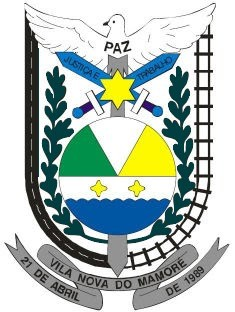
- Flag Coat of arms

- Location in Rondônia state

- Location in Brazil
- Coordinates: 10°24′7″S 65°19′36″W
- Country: Brazil
- Region: North
- State: Rondônia

Area
  - Total: 10,072 km^{2} (3,889 sq mi)

Population (2020)
  - Total: 31,392
  - Density: 3.1168/km^{2} (8.0724/sq mi)
- Time zone: UTC−4 (AMT)

Nova Mamoré is a municipality located in the Brazilian state of Rondônia. In 2020, the population of Nova Mamoré was 31,392. Its area is 10,072 km^{2}.

== Economy ==
The economy of Nova Mamoré is based on mainly agriculture and wood. Its main agriculture comes from the chestnut, cupuaçu, acerola, açaí, guava, mango and pineapple plants. There are approximately 325,000 cattle in Nova Mamoré. In the 1970s and 1980s, the town produced a large amount of gold, but the main mineral source now is water. There are around 27 factories, most of them producing timber.

== Reserves ==
There are three protected areas for indigenous groups in the municipality: Terras Indígenas Igarapé Ribeirão, Reserva dos Karipunas and Terras Indígenas Laje Ninety-five percent of the area of Parque Estadual Guajará-Mirim ("Guajará-Mirim State Park") is located within Nova Mamoré; the remainder is in neighboring Guajará-Mirim. Nova Mamoré contains 27% of the 204,632-hectare (505,660-acre) Rio Ouro Preto Extractive Reserve, created in 1990. The municipality contains 13% of the 197,364-hectare (487,700-acre) Jaci Paraná Extractive Reserve, created in 1996.

== See also ==
- List of municipalities in Rondônia

== Sources ==
- RESEX do Rio Ouro Preto (in Portuguese), ISA: Instituto Socioambiental
