= Western Amazon Ecological Corridor =

Proposed ecological corridor in Brazil

- Corredor Oeste da Amazônia
- Location within Brazil
- Coordinates: 10.467°S 69.155°W
- Area: 27,242,700 hectares (67,318,000 acres)
- Designation: Ecological corridor

The Western Amazon Ecological Corridor (Portuguese: Corredor Oeste da Amazônia) is a proposed ecological corridor connecting conservation units and indigenous territories in the southwest of the Amazon rainforest of Brazil.

== Background ==
The first version of the Ecological Corridors of Tropical Forests of Brazil proposal was developed by a group of consultants at the request of the Brazilian Ministry of the Environment and presented in the first half of 1997. Seven major corridors were proposed: the Central Amazon Ecological Corridor, Northern Amazon Ecological Corridor, South Amazon Ecological Corridor, South Amazon Ecotones Ecological Corridor, Western Amazon Ecological Corridor, Central Atlantic Forest Ecological Corridor and Serra do Mar Ecological Corridor. These corresponded to about 25% of the rainforests of Brazil. Priority was given to the Central Amazon Corridor and the Central Atlantic Forest Corridor, which would test and develop the concepts for use with the subsequent corridors.

== Proposed scope ==
The Western Amazon Ecological Corridor was one of five Amazon region corridors identified. It included six priority areas in four main Amazon ecoregions, and was identified as relatively stable, globally relevant and of the highest priority on a regional scale. The corridor would have an area of 27,242,700 hectares (67,318,000 acres). The proposed corridor comprised almost all of the state of Acre, covering about 7,600,000 hectares (19,000,000 acres). It also covered more than half of the state of Rondônia, and a small part of the state of Amazonas.

Conservation units in the proposal included the Serra do Divisor National Park, Alto Tarauacá Extractive Reserve, Alto Juruá Extractive Reserve, Macauã National Forest, Chico Mendes Extractive Reserve, Jaci Paraná Extractive Reserve, Bom Futuro National Forest, Pacaás Novos National Park, Guaporé Biological Reserve and Corumbiara State Park. As of 2010 the proposed corridor would contain 30 indigenous territories and 19 conservation units in Acre along the border with Peru, covering 45.66% of the state of Acre.

== Sources ==
- Arruda, Moacir Bueno; Nogueira de Sá, Luís Fernando S. (2003), Corredores Ecológicos: Uma abordagem integradora de ecossistemas no Brasil (PDF) (in Portuguese), Brasília: IBAMA
- Ayres, José Márcio; Da Fonseca, Gustavo A. B.; Rylands, Anthony B.; Queiroz, Helder L.; Pinto, Luiz Paulo; Masterson, Donald; Cavalcanti, Roberto B. (2005), Os Corredores Ecológicos das Florestas Tropicais do Brasil (PDF) (in Portuguese), Sociedade Civil Mamirauá, archived from the original (PDF) on 2016-07-31
- Corredores Ecológicos na Mata Atlântica (in Portuguese), RBMA: Atlantic Forest Biosphere Reserve
- Marinho Miranda, Guilherme; Mello Sant'Anna, Fernanda (May 2010), Corredores de desenvolvimento e conservação no Acre: as escalas de planejamento do global ao local (in Portuguese), Buenos Aires: Universidad de Buenos Aires
- O Corredor Central Da Mata Atlãntica (PDF) (in Portuguese), MMA: Ministry of the Environment (Brazil), archived from the original (PDF) on 2016-03-03
