= Preto de Candeias River =

Location
- Country: Brazil

Physical characteristics
- Source
  - location: Rondônia state
- Mouth
  - coordinates: 8°49′S 63°42′W

The Preto de Candeias River is a river of Rondônia state in western Brazil.

== See also ==
- List of rivers of Rondônia
