= Pimenta Bueno River =

Coordinates: 11°39′23″S 61°12′48″W

- Location within Brazil

Location
- Country: Brazil

Physical characteristics
- Source
  - location: Rondônia state

The Pimenta Bueno River is a river of Rondônia state in western Brazil.

== See also ==
- List of rivers of Rondônia
