= Pareci =

Pareci may refer to:

- Another term for Persian; see Persian (disambiguation)
- Pareci people, a name for various Native American tribes in Mato Grosso, Brazil; see list of indigenous peoples of Brazil
