= Candeias, Minas Gerais =

Town and municipality in Minas Gerais, Brazil

Coordinates: 20.7669°S 45.2758°W

- Municipality
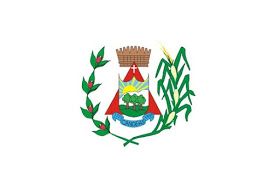
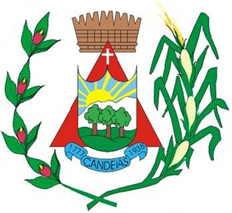
- Flag Coat of arms
- Interactive map of Candeias, Minas Gerais
- Country: Brazil
- State: Minas Gerais
- Region: Southeast
- Time zone: UTC−3 (BRT)

Location of Candeias

Candeias is a municipality in the state of Minas Gerais in the Southeast region of Brazil.

As of 2020, the estimated population was 14,888.

== See also ==
- List of municipalities in Minas Gerais
