= Candeias do Jamari =

- Municipality
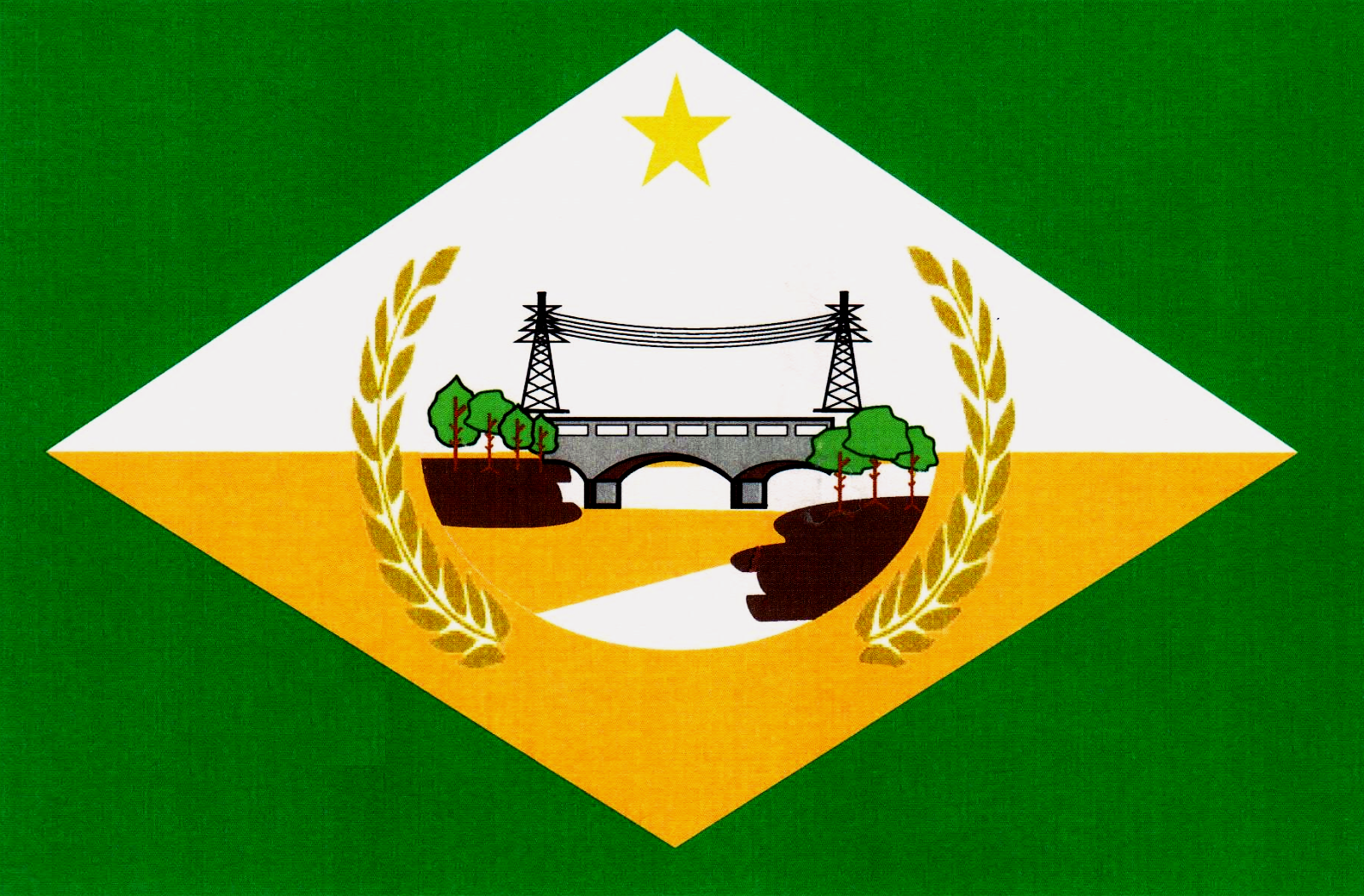
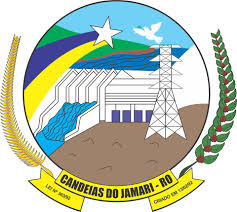
- Flag Coat of arms

- Location within Brazil
- Coordinates: 8.792°S 63.697°W
- Country: Brazil
- State: Rondônia
- Municipality: Candeias do Jamari

Population (2020)
  - Total: 27,388
- Time zone: UTC−4 (AMT)

Candeias do Jamari is a municipality located in the Brazilian state of Rondônia. Its population was 27,388 in 2020 and its area is 6,844 km^{2} (2,642 sq mi).

The municipality contains 76% of the fully protected 71,161-hectare (175,840-acre) Samuel Ecological Station. It also contains part of the 221,218-hectare (546,640-acre) Jacundá National Forest, a sustainable use conservation unit.

== See also ==
- List of municipalities in Rondônia
