= Machadinho River =

- Location within Brazil
- Native name: Rio Machadinho (Portuguese)

Location
- Country: Brazil

Physical characteristics
- Mouth
  - location: Jiparaná River, Campos Amazônicos National Park
  - coordinates: 9.027549°S 61.795104°W

Basin features
- River system: Jiparaná River

The Machadinho River (Portuguese: Rio Machadinho) is a river of Rondônia state in western Brazil, a tributary of the Jiparaná River.

The river runs along the western boundary of the 537 hectares (1,330 acres) Seringueira Extractive Reserve, one of a number of small sustainable use units in the region whose primary product is rubber.

== See also ==
- List of rivers of Rondônia
