= Parecis, Rondônia =

Municipality in Rondônia, Brazil

Parecis
- Municipality
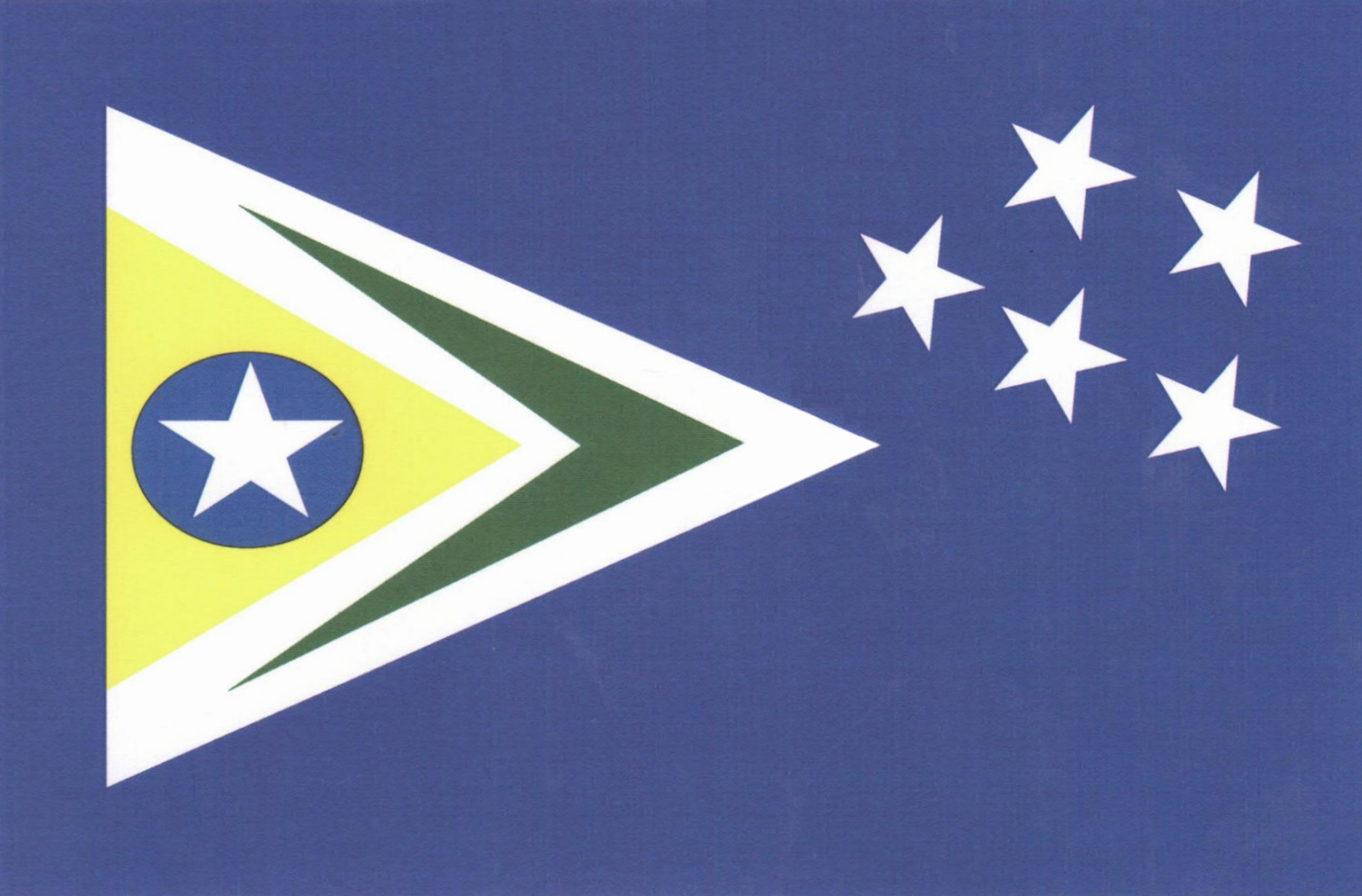
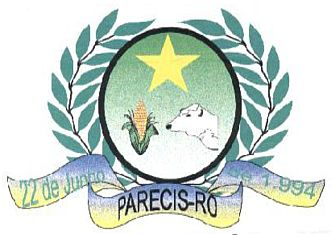
- Flag Coat of arms

- Location in Rondônia state

- Location in Brazil
- Coordinates: 12°11′46″S 61°36′5″W
- Country: Brazil
- Region: North
- State: Rondônia

Area
  - Total: 2,549 km^{2} (984 sq mi)

Population (2020)
  - Total: 6,198
  - Density: 2.432/km^{2} (6.298/sq mi)
- Time zone: UTC−4 (AMT)

Parecis is a municipality located in the Brazilian state of Rondônia. Its population was 6,198 (2020) and its area is 2,549 km^{2}.

== See also ==
- Parecis Plateau
- List of municipalities in Rondônia
