= Jaru River =

Coordinates: 10°04′03″S 61°58′24″W

Location
- Country: Brazil

Physical characteristics
- Source
  - location: Rondônia state

The Jaru River is a river of Rondônia state in western Brazil.

== See also ==
- List of rivers of Rondônia
