= Itapuã do Oeste =

- Municipality
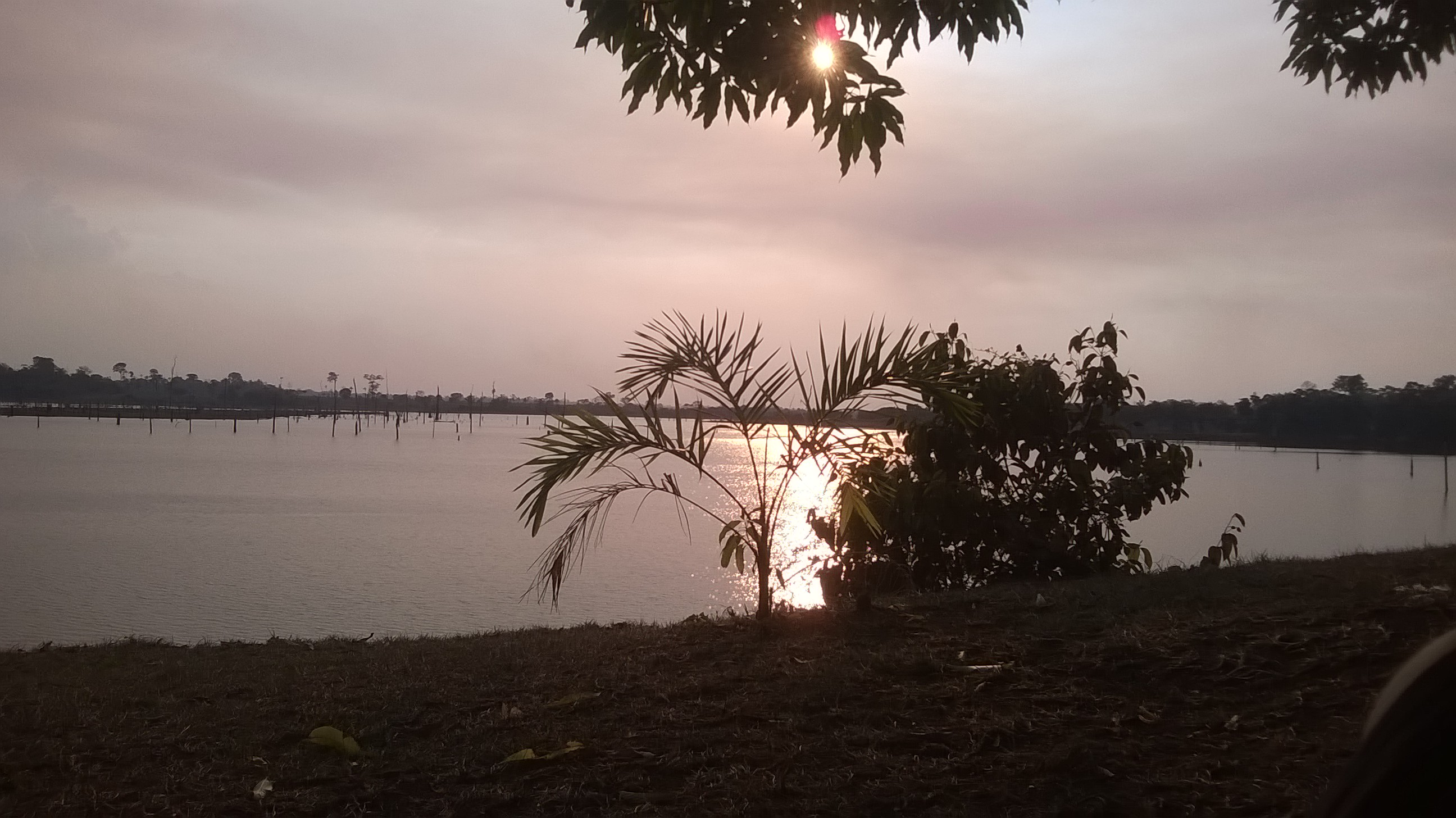

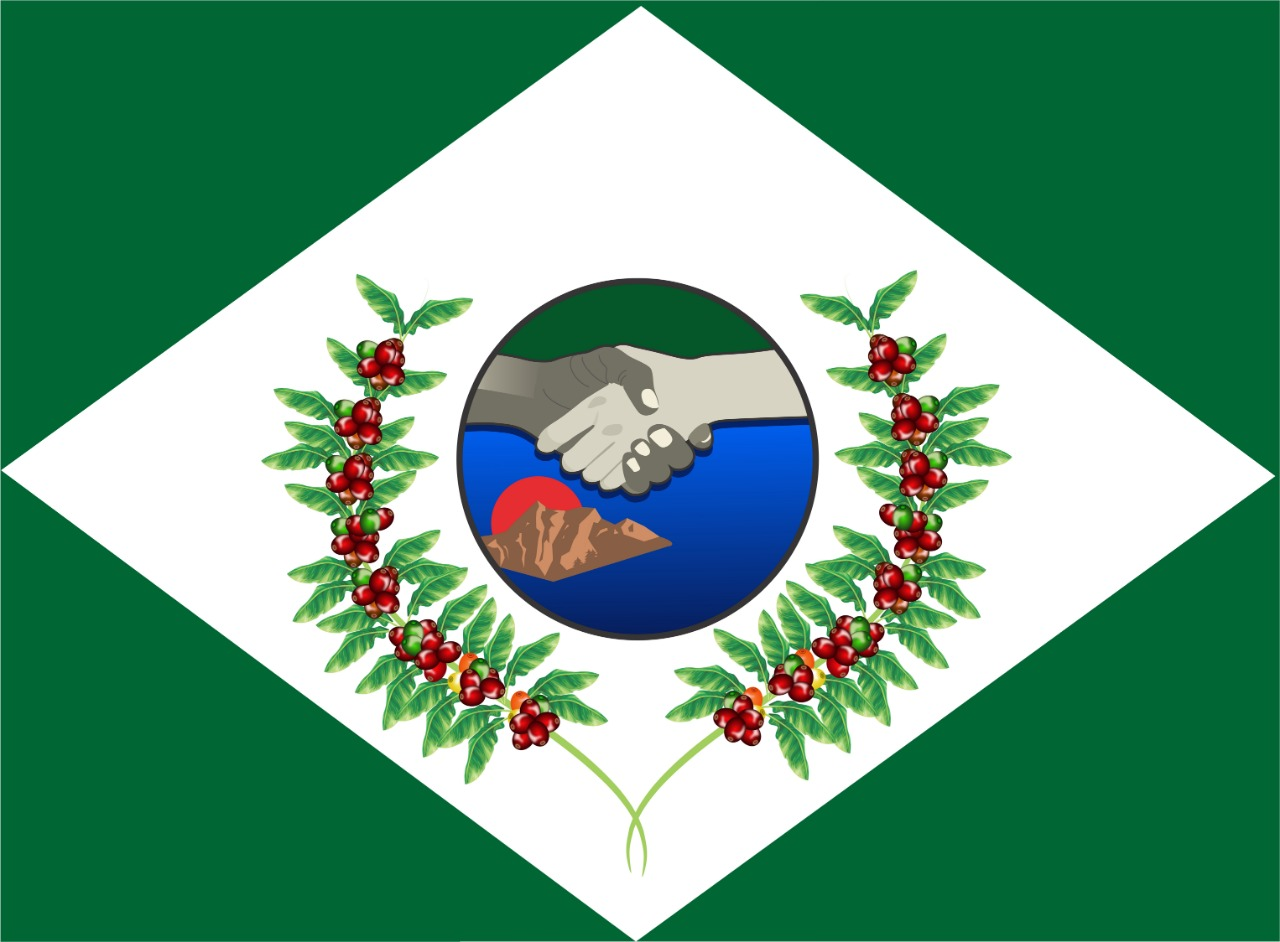
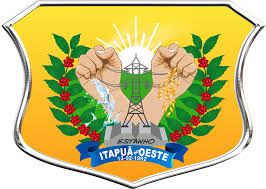
- Flag Coat of arms

- Location within Brazil
- Coordinates: 9.185°S 63.186°W
- Country: Brazil
- State: Rondônia
- Municipality: Itapuã do Oeste

Population (2020)
  - Total: 10,641
- Time zone: UTC−4 (AMT)

Itapuã do Oeste is a municipality located in the Brazilian state of Rondônia. Its population was 10,641 (2020) and its area is 4,081 km^{2}.

The municipality contains 24% of the fully protected 71,161-hectare (175,840-acre) Samuel Ecological Station.

== See also ==
- List of municipalities in Rondônia
