= Capitão Cardoso River =

- Location within Brazil
- Native name: Rio Capitão Cardoso (Portuguese)

Location
- Country: Brazil

Physical characteristics
- Source
  - location: Rondônia state
- Mouth
  - coordinates: 10.989190°S 60.459043°W
- Basin size: 10 000 km2

Basin features
- River system: Roosevelt River

The Capitão Cardoso River is a river forming part of the border between Rondônia and Mato Grosso states in western Brazil. It is a tributary of the Roosevelt River.

== Hydrology ==
The river's watershed is a sub-basin of the Roosevelt River and its headwaters are located in an indigenous reserve near Chapada dos Parecis.

== See also ==
- List of rivers of Rondônia
- List of rivers of Mato Grosso
