= Grupo Candeias =

Grupo Candeias de Capoeira is an international Capoeira group, has its headquarters located in Goiânia, Goiás, Brazil and is presided over by the Mestre Suíno.

== History ==
Grupo Candeias was founded at the SESC Club in the university sector in 1977 in Goiânia, Goias, Brazil.

In that time the group was called Grupo de Capoeira Anglo Regional and the first groups teacher was Carlos Antonio (Carlinhos Chuchu). In the year 1978 Mestre Passarinho took on the group changing the name to Grupo de Capoeira São Bento Pequeno. Two years later, he decided to leave the SESC in Goiânia bringing Grupo São Bento Pequeno and part of the student body with him, in the same year Mestre Suíno took on the group that was left, using the name Grupo de Capoeira Anglo Regional temporarily until he could create a new name for the group.

The group grew very fast, and some of the teachers were founding other groups of their own, and due to this the Anglo Regional became an association with a high number of followers and because of that there were a lot of "problems" going on, and questions about how to get all the groups together as one.

Then in 1991 they had a contest to change the name of the group, so all of them could follow the same graduation system, same philosophy and most importantly the same name. Since 1992 all of them started to use only one name, Grupo Candeias de Capoeira.

Grupo Candeias is considered one of the most expressive groups of capoeira with over ten thousand students. Nowadays you can find Grupo Candeias in most of Brazil, USA, Chile, Peru, Ecuador, Argentina, France, Spain, United Kingdom, France, Portugal, Italy, Bolivia, Colombia, the Czech Republic, Germany, Belgium and Ireland.

The current challenge of the Candeias Group is to grow always contemporary, without losing identity.

The President of the Group is Mr. Elto Pereira de Brito, Master Suíno, who runs it together with the Board of Masters.

== Mestres ==
Currently, the Candeias Group of Capoeira has 50 masters:

- Mestre Suíno
- Mestre Sarará
- Mestre Michelinha
- Mestre Abimael
- Mestre Janaína
- Mestre Vivian
- Mestre Dendê
- Mestre Jair
- Mestre Piau
- Mestre Cabeça
- Mestre Xoroquinho
- Mestre Xeréu
- Mestre Babuíno
- Mestre Tiziu
- Mestre Dr. Decanio
- Mestre Barrão
- Mestre Passarinho
- Mestre Tourinho
- Mestre Soneca
- Mestre Gueroba
- Mestre Senzala
- Mestre Lula
- Mestre Santiago
- Mestre Iúna
- Mestre Besouro
- Mestre Saci
- Mestre Fiapo
- Mestre Saúva
- Mestre Mola
- Mestre Sazuki
- Mestre Biliu
- Mestre Rap
- Mestre Executivo
- Mestre Javali
- Mestre Grosso
- Mestre Rikki
- Mestre Nico
- Mestre Canchan
- Mestre Fabrício
- Mestre Molejo
- Mestre Tucano
- Mestre Lorena
- Mestre Golias
- Mestre Irmãozinho
- Mestre Caixi
- Mestre Carlinhos
- Mestre Stanly
- Mestre Paula
- Mestre Thiaguinho
- Mestre Pantanal
- Mestre Gaúcho
- Mestre Xerox
- Mestre Pele
- Mestre Açai
