= Jaci Paraná River =

- Location within Brazil
- Native name: Rio Jaci Paraná (Portuguese)

Location
- Country: Brazil

Physical characteristics
- Source
  - location: Rondônia state
- Mouth
  - coordinates: 9.215724°S 64.385614°W

Basin features
- River system: Madeira River
- Tributaries
  - left: Formoso River
  - right: Branco River

The Jaci Paraná River (Portuguese: Rio Jaci Paraná) is a river of Rondônia state in western Brazil. It is a tributary of the Madeira River, which it joins at Jaci Paraná in the municipality of Porto Velho, Rondônia

Tributaries of the Jaci Paraná river basin rise in the 216,568 hectares (535,150 acres) Guajará-Mirim State Park, created in 1990. The river forms the western boundary of the 197,364 hectares (487,700 acres) Jaci Paraná Extractive Reserve, created in 1996.

== See also ==
- List of rivers of Rondônia

== Sources ==
- PES de Guajará-Mirim (in Portuguese), ISA: Instituto Socioambiental
