= Imazon =

Imazon – Amazon Institute of People and the Environment
- Imazon – Instituto do Homem e Meio Ambiente da Amazônia
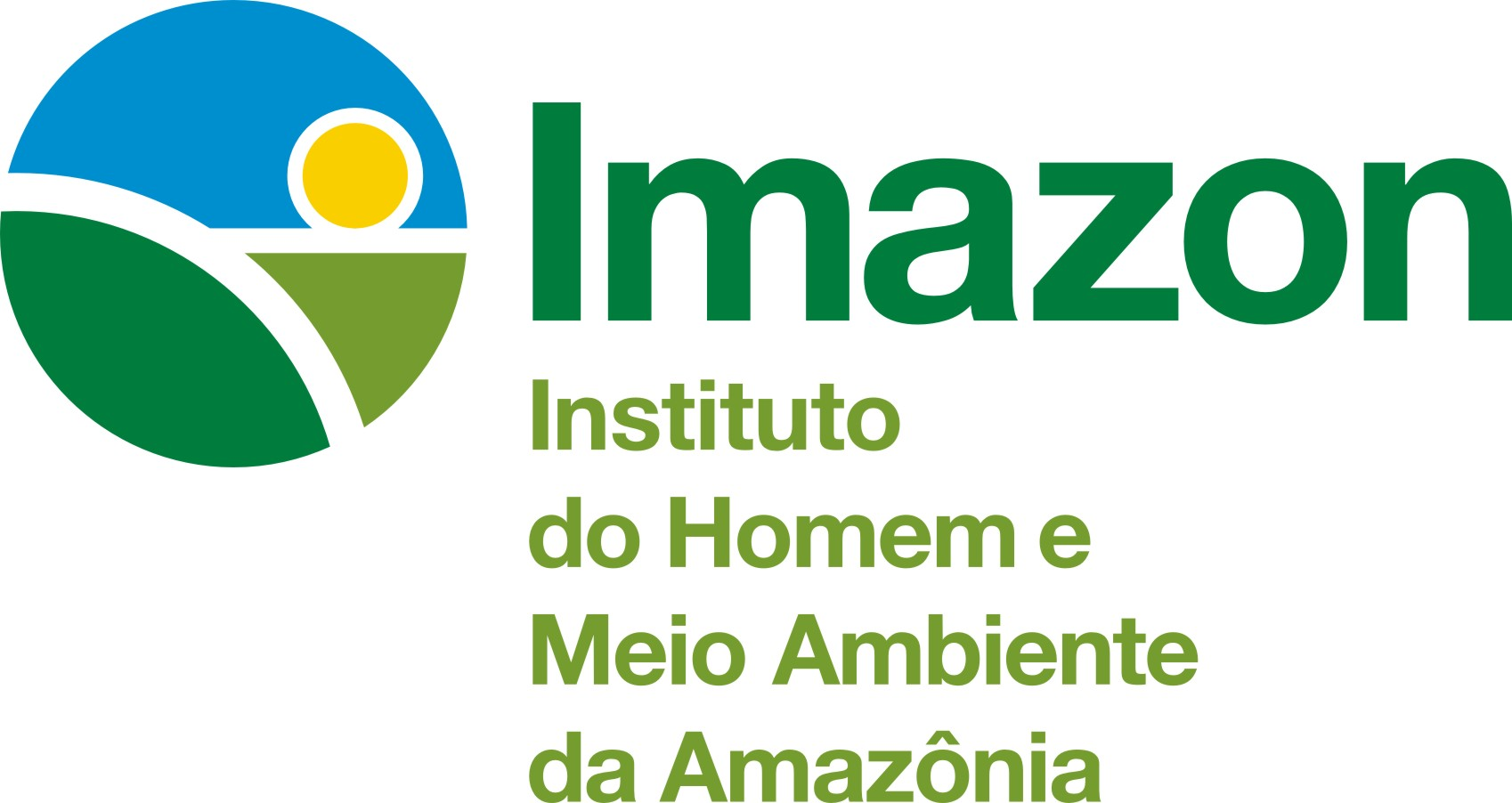

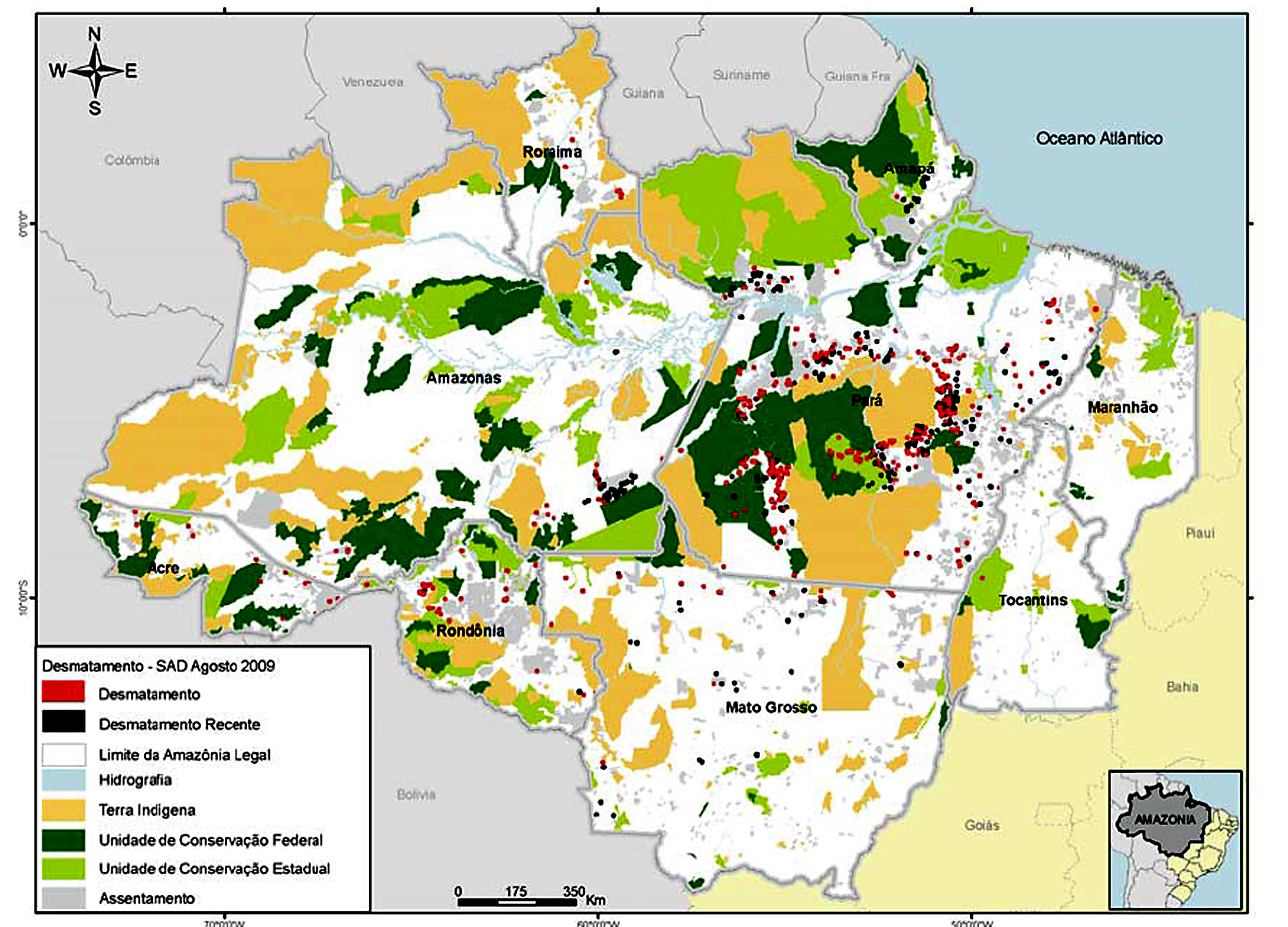
- Brazilian Amazon deforestation map in August, 2009 (Source: Imazon)
- Formation: July 10, 1990; 36 years ago
- Type: NGO
- Legal status: Active
- Headquarters: Belém, Pará, Brazil
- Location: Amazonia
- Region served: Brazil
- Fields: Conservation
- Official language: Portuguese, English
- Website: imazon.org.br

Imazon (Amazon Institute of People and the Environment, Portuguese: Instituto do Homem e Meio Ambiente da Amazônia) is a non-profit organisation based in Belém, Pará, Brazil, that is dedicated to conserving the Amazon rainforest. It has published many reports on aspects of conserving the Amazon environment, has had a significant impact on environmental policy in Brazil, and has developed tools through which deforestation may be viewed online.

== Organization ==
Imazon was founded on 10 July 1990 at the initiative of the American ecologist Christopher Uhl, then a visiting researcher at the Brazilian Agricultural Research Corporation (Embrapa), with Adalberto Veríssimo, David McGrath and Paulo Barreto with the mission of promoting sustainable development in the Brazilian Amazon. The institute is supported by national and international donors, and partners with public, private and non-governmental organisations. Imazon is designated by the Brazil Ministry of Justice as a Civil Society Organization of Public Interest (Oscip). In 2015 the International Center for Climate Governance has ranked Imazon 53rd worldwide among independent centres of strategic studies on economics and climate change policy.

== Work ==
Imazon's programs cover environmental monitoring, sustainability, economics, law, policy and climate change. Imazon is respected for their research in fields such as rehabilitation of deforested area and the micro-economics of forestry, agriculture and ranching in the east of the Amazon region. In the field, Imazon personnel have worked with loggers to show ways to harvest timber that cause lower environmental impact. The institute has been asked to work with the Ministry of Environment and other government organisations in preparing policy documents. As of 2016 Imazon had published over 300 technical papers, 150 articles on technical and public policy topics, and 111 books.

In 2006 the institute developed the Deforestation Alert System to monitor and disseminate information on deforestation in the Amazon. Imazon developed algorithms to detect areas of deforestation, and Vizzuality worked with Imazon and the Google Earth Engine to create a web tool that lets users view and annotate the results of the algorithms. Imazon partnered with the World Resources Institute (WRI) in developing the Global Forest Watch platform for monitoring the world's forests in real time. In December 2009 Google demonstrated the cloud-based "Earth Engine", using the Sistema de Alerta de Deforestation (SAD) from Imazon and the CLASlite system from the Carnegie Institution for Science to let users quickly visualise forest changes.

== Sources ==
- Butler, Rhett A. (16 December 2009), "Google's Earth Engine to help tropical countries monitor forests", Monga Bay
- Imazon, Skoll Foundation
- "Imazon: A ciência engajada na preservação da Amazônia", O Eco, 26 July 2015
- IMAZON – Instituto do Homem e Meio Ambiente da Amazônia (in Portuguese), IBAM: Instituto Brasileiro de Administração Municipal
- Institucional (in Portuguese), Imazon
- Deforestation Alert System, Vizzuality
