= Comemoração River =

Coordinates: 11°45′00″S 60°55′16″W

Location
- Country: Brazil

Physical characteristics
- Source
  - location: Rondônia state

The Comemoração River, also known as the Barão de Melgaço River, is a river of Rondônia state in western Brazil. A Permanent Preservation Area is located in the river's watershed catchment.

== Habitation ==
The Rondon commission noted the ipoteaute tribe were dominant in the upper regions of the river while the tacuatepes were present near the river's mouth.

== See also ==
- List of rivers of Rondônia
