= Serra dos Três Irmãos Ecological Station =

Ecological station in Rondônia, Brazil

- Estação Ecológica da Serra dos Três Irmãos
- IUCN category Ia (strict nature reserve)
- Location within Brazil
- Nearest city: Porto Velho
- Coordinates: 9°07′16″S 64°47′49″W
- Area: 87,412 hectares (216,000 acres)
- Designation: Ecological station
- Created: 28 March 1990
- Administrator: Rondônia State Department of Environmental Development

Serra dos Três Irmãos Ecological Station (Portuguese: Estação Ecológica da Serra dos Três Irmãos) is an ecological station in the state of Rondônia, Brazil. It is a strictly protected conservation unit that preserves an area of Amazon rainforest with exceptional biodiversity.

== History ==
Conservation units in the Purus-Madeira interfluvial.: 4. Serra dos Três Irmãos

The Serra dos Três Irmãos State Ecological Station was created on 28 March 1990 with an area of about 99,813 hectares (246,640 acres). Some land was taken from the Rio Vermelho State Forest. An act of 30 June 2004 gave preliminary approval for implementation of the ecological station. A law of 30 June 2010 reduced the area to 89,847 hectares (222,020 acres), when part was incorporated in the expansion of the Mapinguari National Park. On 13 September 2011 the area was further reduced to 87,412 hectares (216,000 acres) to make way for part of the reservoir of the Santo Antônio Dam.

== Location ==
The Serra dos Três Irmãos Ecological Station is in the municipality of Porto Velho, Rondônia. It is in the north west of the state on the left bank of the Madeira River. It is largely surrounded by the Mapinguari National Park. It is in the Amazon biome. The ESEC contains 19% dense rainforest, 44% open rainforest and 37% savannah-rainforest contact. There are two support bases on the banks of the Karipunas and São Lourenço streams. The conservation unit is in the lower western Amazon plateau, with elevations from 100 to 300 metres (330 to 980 ft). About 240 species of tree have been identified in two small surveys.

== Conservation ==
The ecological station is managed by the State Department of Environmental Development. The terms of reference for the management plan was published on 31 December 2014, although the plan had not been formally approved. As an ecological station the unit has the purpose of preserving nature and supporting scientific research. It is publicly owned. Public visits are allowed for educational purposes and for scientific research, subject to approval by the responsible agency. The conservation unit is supported by the Amazon Region Protected Areas Program.

== Fauna ==
The Madeira River, a major tributary of the Amazon River, plays a basic role in zoogeography of mammals, particularly primates and rodents. Several species that occur north of the river (left bank) do not occur to the south. These include the night monkey (Aotus cf. nigriceps), white-fronted capuchin (Cebus albifrons), Hershkovitz's titi (Callicebus dubius), white-lipped tamarin (Saguinus labiatus), black-capped squirrel monkey (Saimiri boliviensis) and the rodent green acouchi (Myoprocta pratti). A total of 24 species of mammals were recorded during a rapid ecological assessment, including 9 primates. The brown woolly monkey (Lagothrix lagotricha) is found in large numbers. During environmental assessment studies for the upper Madeira River hydroelectric projects 27 species were seen, including 9 primates, five forms of squirrel, two of common agouti (Dasyprocta), two deer, ocelot (Leopardus pardalis), a mustelidae and three rodents. Four of the species were unidentified, indicating exceptional biodiversity and the need for further research.

== Sources ==
- Amazon Biome: protected areas: Coordinated audit, Brasília: Federal Court of Accounts of Brazil, 2014
- ESEC Serra dos Três Irmãos (in Portuguese), ISA: Instituto Socioambiental
- "Estação Ecológica da Serra dos Três Irmãos", Via Rural (in Portuguese), archived from the original on June 3, 2016
- Full list: PAs supported by ARPA, ARPA
- Telma Monteiro (14 June 2009), Troca Indecente (in Portuguese)
- Termo de Referência para Plano de Manejo da Estação Ecológica Estadual Serra dos Três Irmãos nº 2012.0703.00005-5 (PDF) (in Portuguese), ARPA, 2014
