= Candeias River =

Location
- Country: Brazil
- State: Rondônia

Physical characteristics
- Source
  - coordinates: 10°53′S 63°40′W
- Mouth: Jamari River
  - coordinates: 8°39′S 63°31′W
- Length: 390 km (240 mi)

The Candeias River is a river of Rondônia state in western Brazil.

The river flows into the Rio Jamari just downstream of the Samuel dam and reservoir, shortly after passing through the village of Candeis do Jamari. The region is known for its sport fishing. The river is also a tributary of the Rio Madeira.

The Caritiana, a small tribe, lived and traded along the river during at least the 1950s and 1960s.

Dwarf cichlids have also been found living along the river.

Cassiterite has been mined along the river.

== See also ==
- List of rivers of Rondônia
