= Guaporé River =

Guaporé River Iténez River
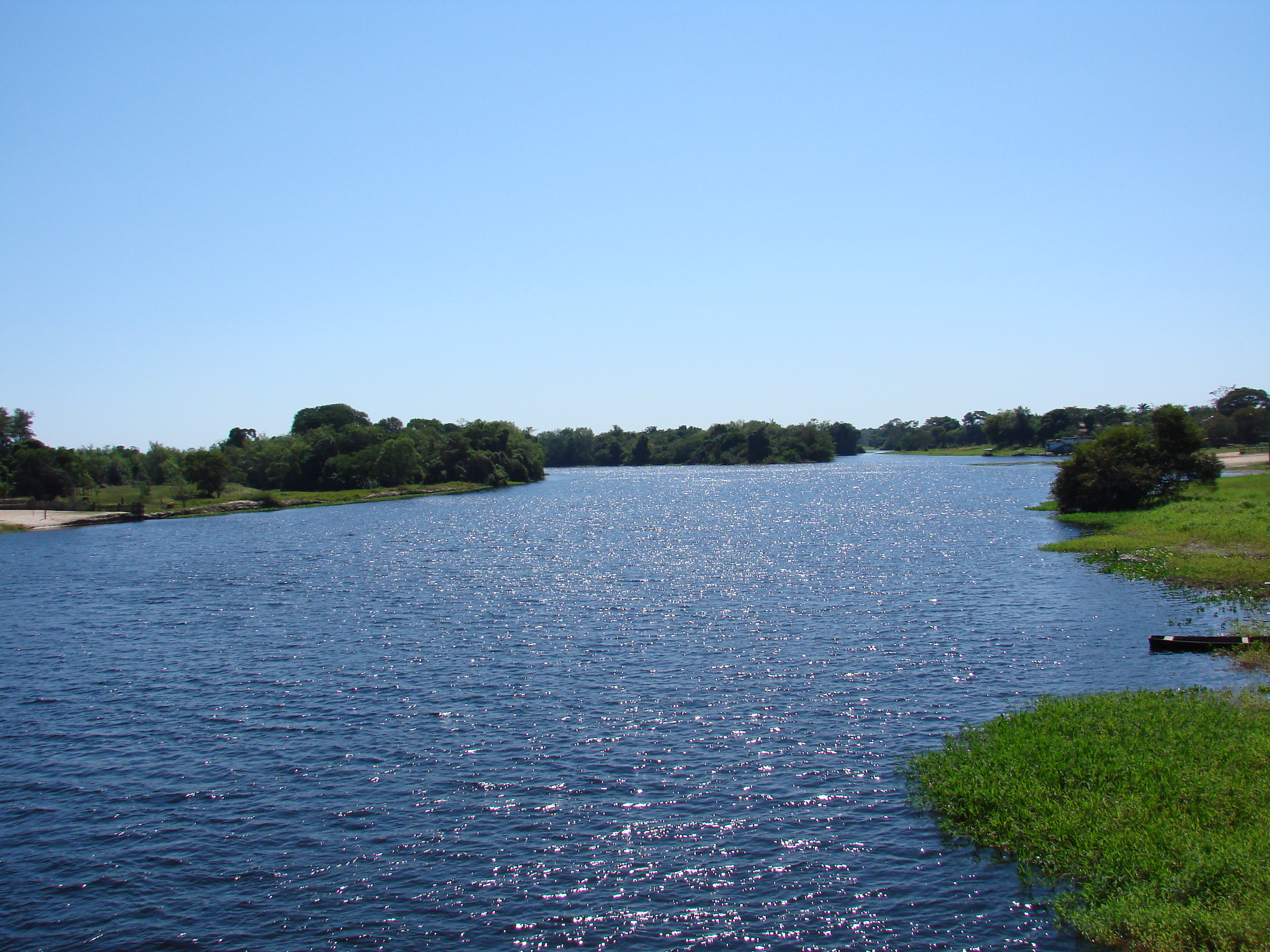
- Rio Guaporé at Pontes e Lacerda (Brazil)

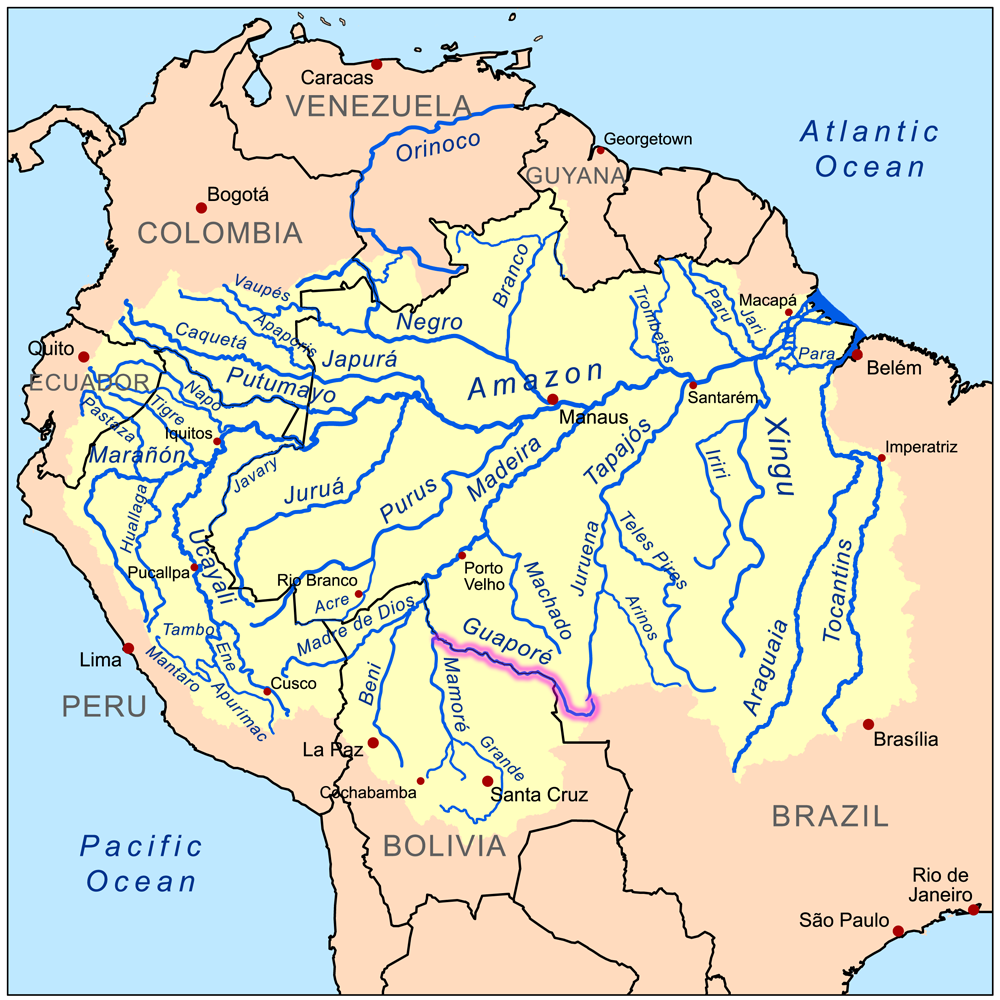
- Map of the Amazon Basin with the Guaporé River highlighted

Location
- Countries: Bolivia; Brazil

Physical characteristics
- Source: Parecis plateau
  - location: Mato Grosso, Brazil
  - coordinates: 14°35′58″S 58°57′11″W
  - elevation: 631 m (2,070 ft)
- Mouth: Mamoré River
  - location: Brazil/Bolivia
  - coordinates: 11°53′15″S 65°1′53″W
  - elevation: 131 m (430 ft)
- Length: 1,260 km (780 mi)
- Basin size: 354,279.3 km^{2} (136,788.0 mi^{2})
- Discharge
  - location: Near mouth
  - average: 2,738.1 m^{3}/s (96,700 cu ft/s)
- Discharge
  - location: Príncipe da Beira
  - average: (1985–2013)2,430 m^{3}/s (86,000 cu ft/s)
  - minimum: 370 m^{3}/s (13,000 cu ft/s)
  - maximum: 5,200 m^{3}/s (180,000 cu ft/s)

Basin features
- Progression: Mamoré → Madeira → Amazon → Atlantic Ocean
- River system: Amazon River
- Tributaries
  - left: Alegre, Verde, Paragua, Río Blanco, Machupo
  - right: Guatire, Branco, Corumbiara, Colorado, Massaco, Cabixi

Guaporé River (Portuguese: Rio Guaporé, Spanish: Río Iténez) is a river in western Brazil and northeastern Bolivia. It is 1,260 km (780 mi) long; 920 km (570 mi) of the river forms the border between Brazil and Bolivia.

The Guaporé is part of the Madeira River basin, which eventually empties into the Amazon River. The Guaporé crosses the eastern part of the Beni savanna region. It forms the border of the 615,771 hectares (1,521,600 acres) Guaporé Biological Reserve, and is fed by rivers originating in the reserve, the São Miguel, Branco, São Simão, Massaco and Colorado.

About 260 fish species are known from the Guaporé River basin, and about 25 of these are endemic. While many fish species in the river essentially are Amazonian, the fauna in the Guaporé also has a connection with the Paraguay River (part of the Río de la Plata Basin). The Guaporé and the Paraguay, while flowing in different directions, both originate in the Parecis plateau of Brazil. Among the fish species shared between these rivers are the black phantom tetra (important in the aquarium industry) and golden dorado (important in fisheries).

== See also ==
- Mamoré–Guaporé linguistic area
