= Parecis Plateau =

Plateau in Rondônia, Brazil

Coordinates: 14.0000°S 59.0000°W

The Parecis plateau (Portuguese: Serra dos Parecis) is a plateau in the Brazilian state of Rondônia and adjacent west-central Mato Grosso. The municipality of Parecis is located at the plateau. Several large rivers have their origin on the plateau, notably the Guaporé, Ji-Paraná, Juruena and Paraguay River. The Mato Grosso Plateau is directly to the east of Parecis.
