= Campo Novo de Rondônia =

Municipality in Rondônia, Brazil

- Municipality
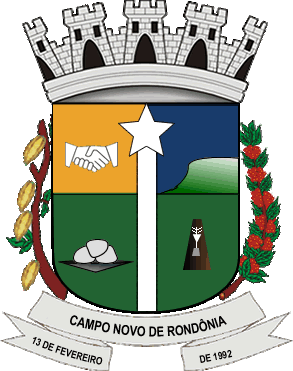
- Flag Coat of arms

- Location in Rondônia state

- Location in Brazil
- Coordinates: 10°34′15″S 63°37′13″W
- Country: Brazil
- Region: North
- State: Rondônia

Area
  - Total: 3,442 km^{2} (1,329 sq mi)

Population (2020)
  - Total: 14,266
  - Density: 4.145/km^{2} (10.73/sq mi)
- Time zone: UTC−4 (AMT)

Campo Novo de Rondônia is a municipality located in the Brazilian state of Rondônia. Its population was 14,266 (2020) and its area is 3,442 km^{2}.
