= Guajará-Mirim =

Municipality in Rondônia, Brazil

- Municipality
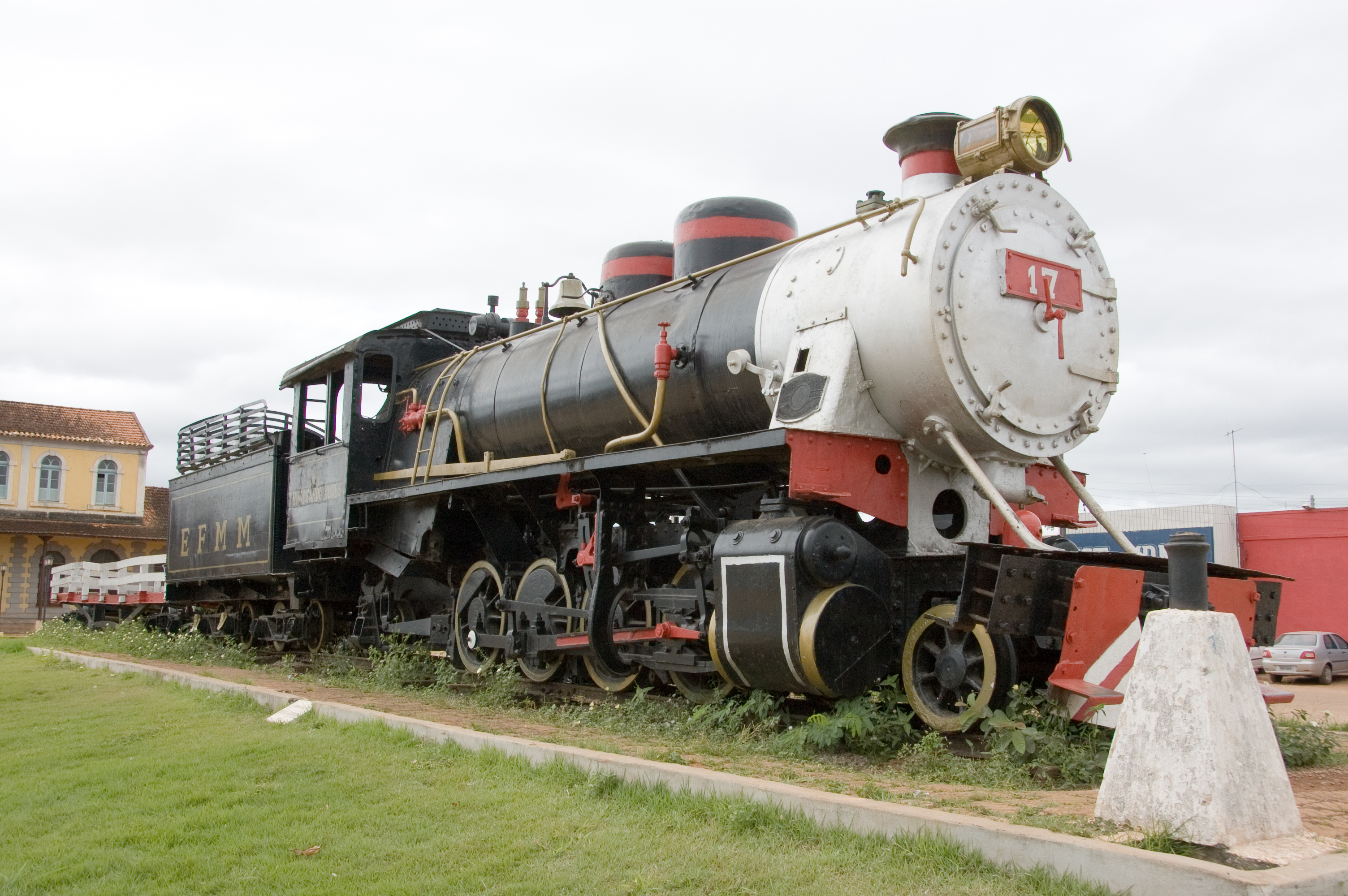
- 1936 BMAG Berliner Maschinenbau (Mikado Type) 2-8-2 N°17 & N°18 EFMM Estrada de Ferro Madeira-Marmoré Steam Locomotive

- Flag Coat of arms

- Location in Rondônia state

- Location in Brazil
- Coordinates: 10°46′58″S 65°20′22″W
- Country: Brazil
- Region: North
- State: Rondônia

Area
  - Total: 24,856 km^{2} (9,597 sq mi)

Population (2020)
  - Total: 46,556
  - Density: 1.8730/km^{2} (4.8511/sq mi)
- Time zone: UTC−4 (AMT)

Guajará-Mirim is a municipality in the Brazilian state of Rondônia. It is located at an altitude of 128 meters. Its population was 46,556 (2020) and its area is 24,856 km^{2}.

== Geography ==
=== Location ===
Guajará-Mirim lies along the Mamoré River, just across the Bolivian border town of Guayaramerín. It was once the southern terminus of the Estrada de Ferro Madeira-Mamoré (the Madeira-Mamoré Railway), which was inaugurated in 1912. It is the seat of the Roman Catholic Diocese of Guajará-Mirim.

=== Conservation ===
The municipality contains the 22,540-hectare (55,700-acre) Traçadal Biological Reserve, a strictly protected area that was created in 1990. It contains 2.33% of the 216,568-hectare (535,150-acre) Guajará-Mirim State Park, created in 1990. It contains the 46,438-hectare (114,750-acre) Rio Ouro Preto Biological Reserve, created in 1990. It contains 73.45% of the 204,632-hectare (505,660-acre) Rio Ouro Preto Extractive Reserve, also created in 1990. The municipality contains 47.5% of the 146,400-hectare (362,000-acre) Rio Cautário State Extractive Reserve, created in 1995. It contains the 73,818-hectare (182,410-acre) Rio Cautário Federal Extractive Reserve, created in 2001.

== Consular representation ==
Bolivia has a Consulate in Guajará-Mirim.

== See also ==
- List of municipalities in Rondônia

== Sources ==
- PES de Guajará-Mirim (in Portuguese), ISA: Instituto Socioambiental
- REBIO do Rio Ouro Preto (in Portuguese), ISA: Instituto Socioambiental
- REBIO do Traçadal (in Portuguese), ISA: Instituto Socioambiental
- RESEX do Rio Cautário (in Portuguese), ISA: Instituto Socioambiental
- RESEX Rio Cautário (Estadual) (in Portuguese), ISA: Instituto Socioambiental
- RESEX do Rio Ouro Preto (in Portuguese), ISA: Instituto Socioambiental
