= List of Indigenous languages of South America =

This article lists the Indigenous languages of South America. Extinct languages are marked by dagger signs (†).

== Demographics by country ==
Demographics of Indigenous languages of South America by country as of 2012, as reported by Crevels (2012):

Language	Alternate names	Family	Branch	Population	Speaker number	Degree of endangerment	Country	Other countries
Mapudungun	Mapuche	Araucanian		113,680	8,413	seriously endangered	Argentina	Chile
Aymara		Aymaran		4,104	?	endangered	Argentina	Chile, Bolivia, Peru
Gününa Yajich	Gününa Küne, Pampa	Chonan		1,585	–	extinct (1960–1970)	Argentina	
Selkʼnam	Ona	Chonan		696	–	extinct (1970s)	Argentina	Chile †
Tehuelche	Aonekʼenk, Pʼe꞉nkʼenk	Chonan		10,590	–	extinct (2019)	Argentina	
Teushen	Tehuesh	Chonan		–	–	extinct (early 1900s)	Argentina	
Mocoví	Moqoyt Laʼqa꞉tqa	Guaicuruan		15,837	2,780	endangered	Argentina	
Pilagá	PitelaGa Laqtak	Guaicuruan		4,465	3,494	potentially endangered	Argentina	
Toba	Namqom	Guaicuruan		69,452	30,410	endangered	Argentina	Paraguay
Vilela		Lule-Vilelan		50	2	moribund	Argentina	
Chorote	Yofuáha, Yowúwa	Matacoan		2,613	1,692	endangered	Argentina	Paraguay
Nivaclé	Nivaklé, Chulupí, Ashluslay	Matacoan		553	224	seriously endangered	Argentina	Paraguay
Wichí	Mataco, ʼWeenhayek in Bolivia	Matacoan		40,036	28,631	potentially endangered	Argentina	Bolivia
Santiagueño Quechua		Quechuan		–	60,000 – 80,000	endangered	Argentina	
Ava Guaraní	Guaraní in Bolivia, Guaraní Occidental in Paraguay	Tupían	Tupí-Guaranían	21,807	5,139	endangered	Argentina	Bolivia
Guaraní Correntino	Guaraní Goyano	Tupían	Tupí-Guaranían	–	100,000 – 1,000,000	potentially endangered	Argentina	
Mbyá		Tupían	Tupí-Guaranían	8,223	3,908	endangered	Argentina	Paraguay, Brazil
Tapieté	Ñandevá in Paraguay	Tupían	Tupí-Guaranían	524	178	seriously endangered	Argentina	Bolivia, Paraguay
Kunza	Atacameño, Likan Antai, Ulipe, Lipe	Isolate		3,044	–	extinct	Argentina	Chile †
Yahgan	Yámana	Isolate		–	–	extinct (2022)	Argentina	Chile
Quechua		Quechuan		2,125,000	1,540,833	potentially endangered	Bolivia	Peru, Ecuador, Colombia, Chile, Argentina
Aymara		Aymaran		1,470,000	1,008,825	potentially endangered	Bolivia	Peru, Chile, Argentina
Chipaya		Uru-Chipayan		2,134	1,800	endangered	Bolivia	
Uchumataqu	Uru	Uru-Chipayan		230	–	extinct (2004)	Bolivia	
Chholo		Uru-Chipayan		?	1?	extinct	Bolivia	
Puquina		Puquinan		–	–	extinct	Bolivia	Peru †
Kallawaya		Mixed		–	?	seriously endangered	Bolivia	
Machineri		Arawakan		30	13	seriously endangered	Bolivia	Brazil
Baure		Arawakan		886	67	seriously endangered	Bolivia	
Moxo (Mojeño), Trinitario		Arawakan		30,000	3,140	endangered	Bolivia	
Moxo (Mojeño), Ignaciano		Arawakan		2,000	1,080	seriously endangered	Bolivia	
Paunaca		Arawakan		?	1 (2024)	moribund	Bolivia	
Moré	Itene	Chapacuran		64	44	seriously endangered	Bolivia	
Chácobo		Pano-Tacanan	Panoan	516	380	endangered	Bolivia	
Pacahuara		Pano-Tacanan	Panoan	46	6	moribund	Bolivia	
Yaminahua		Pano-Tacanan	Panoan	93	51	seriously endangered	Bolivia	Peru, Brazil
Ese Ejja		Pano-Tacanan	Tacanan	732	518	endangered	Bolivia	Peru
Araona		Pano-Tacanan	Tacanan	158	111	seriously endangered	Bolivia	
Cavineña		Pano-Tacanan	Tacanan	1,683	601	endangered	Bolivia	
Tacana		Pano-Tacanan	Tacanan	7,345	1,153 / 50–500	seriously endangered	Bolivia	
Maropa	Reyesano	Pano-Tacanan	Tacanan	4,919	53 / 12	moribund	Bolivia	
Yuki		Tupían	Tupí-Guaranían	208	140	seriously endangered	Bolivia	
Sirionó		Tupían	Tupí-Guaranían	268	187	endangered	Bolivia	
Guarayo		Tupían	Tupí-Guaranían	11,953	8,433	potentially endangered	Bolivia	
Guaraní	Chiriguano	Tupían	Tupí-Guaranían	125,159	43,633	potentially endangered	Bolivia	Argentina
Tapieté		Tupían	Tupí-Guaranían	41	29	seriously endangered	Bolivia	Argentina, Paraguay
ʼWeenhayek	Mataco, Wichí in Argentina	Matacoan		1,797	1,929	endangered	Bolivia	Argentina
Ayoreo		Zamucoan		1,398	1,398	endangered	Bolivia	Paraguay
Canichana		Isolate		404	4 / 0?	extinct	Bolivia	
Movima		Isolate		12,230	1,173	seriously endangered	Bolivia	
Cayubaba		Isolate		664	23 / <3	moribund	Bolivia	
Itonama		Isolate		2,791	389 / < 2	moribund	Bolivia	
Mosetén		Mosetenan		1,588	948	endangered	Bolivia	
Tsimaneʼ	Chimane	Mosetenan		8,615	6,351	potentially endangered	Bolivia	
Leko		Isolate		4,186	132 / 20	moribund	Bolivia	
Yurakaré		Isolate		2,829	1,809	endangered	Bolivia	
Besïro	Chiquitano	Macro-Gê	Chiquitano	195,624	4,615	seriously endangered	Bolivia	Brazil
Banawá Yafí	Banawá	Arawan		100 (2006)	100	seriously endangered	Brazil	
Deni		Arawan		875 (2006)	875	endangered	Brazil	
Jamamadí	Yamamadí, Kanamantí	Arawan		884 (2006)	800	endangered	Brazil	
Jarawara	Jarauara	Arawan		180 (2006)	180	endangered	Brazil	
Kulina	Culina, Madihá, Madiha, Madija	Arawan		3,500 (2006)	3,000	endangered	Brazil	Peru
Paumari	Palmari	Arawan		892 (2006)	290 (2000)	seriously endangered	Brazil	
Zuruahã	Sorowaha, Suruwaha	Arawan		136 (2007)	136	seriously endangered	Brazil	
Apurinã	Popingaré, Kangitê, Kaxiriri, Cacharary	Arawakan		3,256 (2006)	2,000	endangered	Brazil	
Asháninka	Kampa, Axíninka	Arawakan		869 (2004)	813	endangered	Brazil	Peru
Baniwa	Baniwa do Içana, Baniva, Baniua, Walimanai, Wakuenai	Arawakan		5,811 (2005)	5,811	potentially endangered	Brazil	Colombia, Venezuela
Baré		Arawakan		10,275 (2005)	2	moribund	Brazil	Venezuela
Enawê-Nawê	Salumã	Arawakan		445 (2006)	445	endangered	Brazil	
Kaixana	Caixana	Arawakan		505 (2006)	1	moribund	Brazil	
Kinikinau	Guaná	Arawakan		250 (2005)	11 (2007)	moribund	Brazil	
Kuripako	Curripaco, Curipaco, Coripaco	Arawakan		1,332 (2005)	1,332	endangered	Brazil	Colombia, Venezuela
Machineri	Manchineri, Yine	Arawakan		937 (2004)	937	endangered	Brazil	Bolivia
Mehinako	Mehinaku, Meinaku	Arawakan		227 (2006)	200	seriously endangered	Brazil	
Palikur	Palikuʼene, Aukwayene, Aukuyene	Arawakan		1,330 (2006)	1,300	endangered	Brazil	French Guiana
Parecí	Paresí, Arití, Halití	Arawakan		2,005 (2008)	1,000	endangered	Brazil	
Tariana	Tariano	Arawakan		1,914 (2002)	100	seriously endangered	Brazil	Colombia
Terêna	Terena, Tereno	Arawakan		19,961	19,000	potentially endangered	Brazil	
Wapixana	Wapishana, Wapisiana, Uapixana, Vapidiana	Arawakan		7,000 (2008)	4,000?	endangered	Brazil	Guyana
Warekena	Werekena, Uarequena	Arawakan		806 (206)	20	seriously endangered	Brazil	Venezuela
Waurá	Waujá, Uará	Arawakan		321 (2008)	321	endangered	Brazil	
Yawalapití	Iaualapití	Arawakan		222 (2006)	10?	moribund	Brazil	
Bakairí	Bacairí, Kurâ	Cariban		950 (1999)	950	endangered	Brazil	
Galibí	Galibí do Oiapoque, Kariʼna, Kaliña	Cariban		66	only elders	seriously endangered	Brazil	Venezuela, French Guiana, Suriname, Guyana
Hixkaryana	Hyxkaryana	Cariban		631 (2006)	600	endangered	Brazil	
Ikpeng	Txicão, Txikão	Cariban		342 (2006)	342	endangered	Brazil	
Ingarikó	Akawayo, Kapon	Cariban		1,170 (2007)	1,170	endangered	Brazil	Guyana, Venezuela
Kalapalo	Calapalu	Cariban		506 (2006)	506	endangered	Brazil	
Katxuyana-Xikuyana	Kaxuyana-Xikuyana, Kaxuyana, Caxuiana	Cariban		230 (2006)	150	seriously endangered	Brazil	
Kuikuro	Cuicuro	Cariban		509 (2006)	600	endangered	Brazil	
Makuxí	Macuxi, Macushi, Pemon	Cariban		23,433 (2006)	15,000	potentially endangered	Brazil	Venezuela
Matipú		Cariban		103 (2006)	10	moribund	Brazil	
Nahukwá	Nahukuá, Nafuquá	Cariban		124 (2006)	124	seriously endangered	Brazil	
Naruvoto		Cariban		78 (2003)	?	seriously endangered	Brazil	
Patamona	Kapon, Akawayo	Cariban		87 (2006)	?	seriously endangered	Brazil	Guyana, Venezuela
Taurepang	Taulipang, Pemon, Arekuna	Cariban		582 (2002)	500	seriously endangered	Brazil	Guyana, Venezuela
Tiriyó	Trio, Tarëno, Tirió, Tirio, Tarona, Yawi, Pianokoto	Cariban		1,156 (2006)	1,156	endangered	Brazil	Suriname
Waimirí-Atroarí	Kinã, Kinja	Cariban		1,120 (2005)	1,120	endangered	Brazil	
Waiwai	Wai Wai, TunayanaWaiwai, Katuena	Cariban		2,914 (2005)	2,914	potentially endangered	Brazil	Guyana
Wayana	Waiana, Uaiana, Aparaí	Cariban		288 (2006)	288	endangered	Brazil	Suriname, French Guiana
Yekuana	Yeʼkuana, Yekwana, Yecuana, Makiritare, Maquiritare, Maiongong, Soʼto	Cariban		430 (2000)	430	endangered	Brazil	Venezuela
Kuyubim	Kujubí, Cojubím, Kaw Ta Yo	Chapacuran		55 (2006)	2 (2001)	moribund	Brazil	
Miguelenho	Uomo	Chapacuran		50	1	moribund	Brazil	
Moré		Chapacuran		30 (2002)	12 (2002)	seriously endangered	Brazil	Bolivia
Oro Win	Oro Towati	Chapacuran		56 (2006)	5	moribund	Brazil	
Torá		Chapacuran		312 (2006)	–	extinct	Brazil	
Wariʼ	Pakaa Nova, Pacaás Novos	Chapacuran		2,721 (2006)	2,721	potentially endangered	Brazil	
Kadiweu	Kadiweo, Caduveo, Cadiuéu, Ejiwajigi, Mbaya-Guaicuru	Guaicuruan		1,629 (2006)	1,600	endangered	Brazil	
Kanamarí	Canamarí, Tüküná, Tâkâna	Harakmbut-Katukinan		1,654 (2006)	most?	endangered	Brazil	
Katawixí	Catawixi, Catauixi, Catawishi	Harakmbut-Katukinan		10? (1986)	10?	seriously endangered	Brazil	
Katukina do Biá	Pedá Djapá, Tüküná	Harakmbut-Katukinan		450 (2007)	1 (1976)	possibly extinct	Brazil	
Tsohom Djapá	Tucano	Harakmbut-Katukinan		100 (1985)	30?	seriously endangered	Brazil	
Bororo	Eastern Bororo, Boe, Boe Wadáru	Macro-Gê	Bororo	1,390(2006)	1,390	endangered	Brazil	
Umutina	Omotina, Barbados	Macro-Gê	Bororo	445 (2009)	–	extinct	Brazil	
Chiquitano	Linguará, Anenho	Macro-Gê	Chiquitano	737 (2006)	50	seriously endangered	Brazil	Bolivia
Guató		Macro-Gê	Guató	370 (2006)	5	moribund	Brazil	
Apinajé	Apinayé, Apinaié, Timbira Ocidentais	Macro-Gê	Gêan	1,525 (2006)	1,500	endangered	Brazil	
Canela	Kanela, Kanela Ramkokamekrá, Kanela Apanyekra	Macro-Gê	Gêan	2,502 (2006)	2,502	endangered	Brazil	
Gavião Perkatêjê	Gavião, Parkatêjê, Gavião do Pará, Gavião do Mãe Maria	Macro-Gê	Gêan	476 (2006)	476	endangered	Brazil	
Gavião Pukobiê	Pykopjê, Gavião do Maranhão, Timbira	Macro-Gê	Gêan	494 (2006)	494	endangered	Brazil	
Kaingang	Caingangue, Kanhgág	Macro-Gê	Gêan	28,000 (2006)	18,500	potentially endangered	Brazil	
Krahô	Craô, Kraô, Mehim, Timbira	Macro-Gê	Gêan	2,184 (2006)	2,184	endangered	Brazil	
Kren-Yê		Macro-Gê	Gêan	30 (1999)	5 (2020)	moribund	Brazil	
Krikatí	Krinkatí, Krikatí-Timbira, Timbira	Macro-Gê	Gêan	682 (2005)	682	endangered	Brazil	
Mebêngokrê	Kayapó, Xikrin, Put Karot	Macro-Gê	Gêan	7,266 (2006)	7,266	potentially endangered	Brazil	
Panará	Krenhakarore, Krenakore, Krenakarore, Kreen-Akarore, Índios Gigantes	Macro-Gê	Gêan	374 (2008)	374	endangered	Brazil	
Kisêdjê	Suyá, Suiá, Mëkisêdjê	Macro-Gê	Gêan	351 (2006)	351	endangered	Brazil	
Tapayuna	Suyá Orientais, Novos Suyá, Beiço-de-Pau	Macro-Gê	Gêan	58 (1995)	58?	seriously endangered	Brazil	
Xakriabá	Xacriabá, Xikriabá	Macro-Gê	Gêan	7,665 (2006)	0?	possibly extinct	Brazil	
Xavante	Aʼuwe, Awen	Macro-Gê	Gêan	13,303 (2007)	13,303	potentially endangered	Brazil	
Xerente	Akwê, Akwen, Acuen	Macro-Gê	Gêan	2,569 (2006)	2,569	potentially endangered	Brazil	
Xokleng	Shokleng, Xokrén, Laklanô, Bugres, Botocudos, Aweikoma, Kaingang de Santa Catarina, Aweikoma-Kaingang	Macro-Gê	Gêan	887 (2004)	100	seriously endangered	Brazil	
Arikapú	Aricapú	Macro-Gê	Jabutí	30 (2006)	1	moribund	Brazil	
Djeoromitxí	Jeoromitxí, Jabutí	Macro-Gê	Jabutí	165 (2006)	30 (2008)	seriously endangered	Brazil	
Yatê	Iatê, Fulniô, Carnijó	Macro-Gê	Yatê	2,930 (1999)	1,000	endangered	Brazil	
Javaé	Karajá	Macro-Gê	Karajá	1,208 (2006)	800?	endangered	Brazil	
Karajá	Carajá, Iny	Macro-Gê	Karajá	2,532 (2006)	2,250	endangered	Brazil	
Xambioá	Karajá do Norte, Ixybiowa, Iraru Mahãdu	Macro-Gê	Karajá	269 (2006)	10	moribund	Brazil	
Krenak	Crenaque, Crenac, Krenac, Nakrehé, Krenak-Nakrehé, Borun; Botocudos; Aimorés	Macro-Gê	Krenakan	204 (2006)	10	moribund	Brazil	
Maxakalí	Maxacalí, Monacó, Kumanuxú, Tikmuún	Macro-Gê	Maxakalí	1,271 (2006)	1,271	endangered	Brazil	
Pataxó	Pataxó do Norte, Pataxó do Sur, Hã Hã Hãe	Macro-Gê	Maxakalí	2,219 (2005)	–	extinct (late 1900s)	Brazil	
Ofayé	Ofaié, Opayé, Ofayé-Xavante	Macro-Gê	Ofayé	61 (2006)	12	seriously endangered	Brazil	
Rikbaktsá	Erikbaktsá, Erigpaktsá, Orelhas de Pau, Canoeiros	Macro-Gê	Rikbaktsá	1,117 (2006)	900	endangered	Brazil	
Mura		Muran		9,299 (2006)	–	extinct	Brazil	
Pirahã	Mura-Pirahã	Muran		389 (2006)	389	endangered	Brazil	
Dâw	Kamã	Nadahup		120	120	seriously endangered	Brazil	
Hup	Hupdá, Hupdé, Hupdá Makú	Nadahup		1,500	1,500	endangered	Brazil	Colombia
Kuyabi	Kuyawi	Nadahup		20	20	seriously endangered	Brazil	
Nadëb	Nadöbö, Anodöb, Makunadöbö, Guariba, Guariba Tapuyo, Kabori, Xiriwai	Nadahup		350	350	endangered	Brazil	
Yuhup		Nadahup		617	617	endangered	Brazil	Colombia
Latundê	Northern Nambikwara (Nambikwara do Norte)	Nambikwaran		19	19	seriously endangered	Brazil	
Lakondê	Northern Nambikwara (Nambikwara do Norte)	Nambikwaran		7	1	seriously endangered	Brazil	
Mamaindê	Northern Nambikwara (Nambikwara do Norte)	Nambikwaran		250	250	endangered	Brazil	
Negarotê	Northern Nambikwara (Nambikwara do Norte)	Nambikwaran		80	80	seriously endangered	Brazil	
Tawandê	Northern Nambikwara (Nambikwara do Norte)	Nambikwaran		few	1	moribund	Brazil	
Southern Nambikwara	Nambikwara do Sul	Nambikwaran		721	721	seriously endangered	Brazil	
Sabanê		Nambikwaran		140	3	moribund	Brazil	
Arara Shawãdawa	Arara do Acre, Shawanauá	Panotacanan	Panoan	332 (2004)	9 (2000)	moribund	Brazil	
Katukina-Kanamari	Katukina [Tüküná, Pi:Dyapa], Kanamarí [Tüküna Kanamarí, Canamari], Tsohom-Dyapa [Tsunhum-Djapá, Tyonhwak Dyapa], Katukina do Acre, Katukina Pano	Panotacanan	Panoan	2,239 (2008)	2,239	potentially endangered	Brazil	
Kaxararí	Caxarari, Kaxariri	Panotacanan	Panoan	322 (2009)	300?	seriously endangered	Brazil	
Kaxinawá	Caxinauá, Cashinahuá, Cashinahua, Hantxa Kuin, Huni Kuin	Panotacanan	Panoan	4,500 (2004)	4,500	potentially endangered	Brazil	Peru
Korubo		Panotacanan	Panoan	26 (2007)	26	seriously endangered	Brazil	
Kulina do Acre	Kulina Pano, Culina	Panotacanan	Panoan	125 (2006)	only elders	seriously endangered	Brazil	
Marubo		Panotacanan	Panoan	1,252 (2006)	1,252	endangered	Brazil	
Matís		Panotacanan	Panoan	322 (2008)	322	endangered	Brazil	
Matsés		Panotacanan	Panoan	1,592 (2006)	1,500	endangered	Brazil	Peru
Maya	Quixito	Panotacanan	Panoan	400	400	endangered	Brazil	Peru?
Nukini	Nuquini, Nukuíni	Panotacanan	Panoan	600 (2003)	–	extinct	Brazil	
Poyanawa	Poianáua	Panotacanan	Panoan	403 (1999)	2	moribund	Brazil	
Shanenawá	Katukina, Shanenawá	Panotacanan	Panoan	361 (2006)	300	endangered	Brazil	
Yaminawa	Jaminawa, Iauminawa	Panotacanan	Panoan	855 (2006)	600	endangered	Brazil	Bolivia, Peru
Yawanawá	Yauanauá, Iauanauá	Panotacanan	Panoan	519 (2006)	519	endangered	Brazil	
Arapaso	Arapaço	Tucanoan		569	0?	possibly extinct	Brazil	
Bará	Waimajã, Waípinõmakã	Tucanoan		21 (2005)	21	seriously endangered	Brazil	Colombia
Barasana	Barasano, Pãnerã, Hanera, Panenoá	Tucanoan		34 (2005)	34	seriously endangered	Brazil	Colombia
Desano	Desana, Dessano, Wira, Umúkomasá	Tucanoan		2,204 (2005)	700	endangered	Brazil	Colombia
Karapanã	Carapanã, Muteamasa, Ukopinõpõna	Tucanoan		63 (2005)	63	seriously endangered	Brazil	Colombia
Kotiria	Wanano, Wanana, Guanano, Uanano	Tucanoan		735 (2005)	650	endangered	Brazil	Colombia
Kubeo	Cubeo, Cobewa, Kubéwa, Pamíwa	Tucanoan		381 (2005)	150–200	seriously endangered	Brazil	Colombia
Makuna	Macuna, Yeba-Masã	Tucanoan		32 (2005)	32	seriously endangered	Brazil	Colombia
Mirity-Tapuya	Miriti-Tapuia, Buia-Tapuya	Tucanoan		75 (2005)	0?	possibly extinct	Brazil	
Piratapuya	Piratapuia, PiraTapuia, Piratapuyo, Waíkana	Tucanoan		1,433 (2005)	700	seriously endangered	Brazil	Colombia
Siriano	Siria-Masã	Tucanoan		71 (2005)	71?	seriously endangered	Brazil	Colombia
Tukano	Tucano, Yeʼpãmasa, Dasea	Tucanoan		6,241 (2005)	7,000	potentially endangered	Brazil	Colombia
Tuyuka	Tuyuca, Tuiuca, Dokapuara, Utapinõmakãphõná	Tucanoan		825 (2005)	800?	endangered	Brazil	Colombia
Yurutí	Jurití	Tucanoan		?	0?	possibly extinct	Brazil	Colombia
Karitiana		Tupían	Arikem	320 (2005)	320	endangered	Brazil	
Awetí	Aueti	Tupían	Awetí	160 (2008)	160	seriously endangered	Brazil	
Aruá		Tupían	Monde	36	12	seriously endangered	Brazil	
Cinta Larga		Tupían	Monde	645	645	endangered	Brazil	
Gavião	Gavião de Rondônia, Ikõlej, Ikõleey, Ikõro	Tupían	Monde	523 (2004)	523	endangered	Brazil	
Zoró	Pageyn	Tupían	Monde	599 (2008)	599	endangered	Brazil	
Paiter	Suruí-Paiter, Suruí de Rondônia	Tupían	Monde	1,007 (2006)	1,007	endangered	Brazil	
Salamãi	Sanamãika, Mondé	Tupían	Monde	?	2	moribund	Brazil	
Kuruaya	Kuruaia, Curuaia	Tupían	Mundurukú	129 (2006)	3	moribund	Brazil	
Mundurukú	Mundurucú	Tupían	Mundurukú	10,065 (2002)	8,000	endangered	Brazil	
Puruborá		Tupían	Puruborá	62 (2006)	2	moribund	Brazil	
Karo	Arara, Arara Karo, Arara de Rondônia, Arara Tupi, Ntogapíd, Itoga-púk, Ramarama, Uruku, Urumi, Ytangá	Tupían	Ramaraman	208 (2006)	200	seriously endangered	Brazil	
Sateré-Mawé	Sataré-Maué, Sateré, Mawé	Tupían	Sateré-Mawé	9,156 (2008)	6,219	endangered	Brazil	
Ajurú	Wayurú, Wayoró	Tupían	Tuparían	94 (2006)	8	seriously endangered	Brazil	
Akuntsú	Akuntʼsu, Akunsu	Tupían	Tuparían	5 (2009)	5	moribund	Brazil	
Makurap	Macurap	Tupían	Tuparían	381 (2006)	50	seriously endangered	Brazil	
Sakurabiat	Mekens, Mekém, Sakirabiat	Tupían	Tuparían	84 (2006)	22 (2008)	seriously endangered	Brazil	
Tuparí		Tupían	Tuparían	433 (2006)	150 (2005)	seriously endangered	Brazil	
Amanayé	Amanaié, Ararandeuara	Tupían	Tupí-Guaranían	192 (2001)	0?	possibly extinct	Brazil	
Anambé		Tupían	Tupí-Guaranían	132 (2000)	6 (2000)	moribund	Brazil	
Apiaká	Apiacá	Tupían	Tupí-Guaranían	1,000 (2009)	–	extinct (2011)	Brazil	
Araweté	Araueté	Tupían	Tupí-Guaranían	339 (2006)	339	endangered	Brazil	
Akwawa	varieties: Asuriní do Tocantins, Parakanã, Suruí do Tocantins	Tupían	Tupí-Guaranían	1,548	1,548	endangered	Brazil	
Asuriní do Tocantins		Tupían	Tupí-Guaranían	384 (2006)	384	endangered	Brazil	
Parakanã	Apiterewa	Tupían	Tupí-Guaranían	900 (2004)	900	endangered	Brazil	
Suruí do Tocantins		Tupían	Tupí-Guaranían	264 (2006)	264	endangered	Brazil	
Asuriní do Xingu	Awaeté	Tupían	Tupí-Guaranían	125 (2006)	125	seriously endangered	Brazil	
Avá-Canoeiro	Canoeiro, Carijó, Índios Negros, Cara Preta	Tupían	Tupí-Guaranían	16	16?	seriously endangered	Brazil	
Diahoi	Jiahui, Jahói, Djahui, Diahkoi, Diarroi	Tupían	Tupí-Guaranían	88	1	moribund	Brazil	
Guajá	Awá, Avá	Tupían	Tupí-Guaranían	283 (2005)	283	endangered	Brazil	
Guajajara	Tenetehára, Zeʼegete	Tupían	Tupí-Guaranían	19,471(2006)	14,000	potentially endangered	Brazil	
Juma	Yuma	Tupían	Tupí-Guaranían	12 (2024)	3 (2024)	moribund	Brazil	
Kaʼapor	Urubu-Kaapor, Kaaporté	Tupían	Tupí-Guaranían	991 (2006)	991	endangered	Brazil	
Kayabí	Kaiabí, Caiabí	Tupían	Tupí-Guaranían	1,619 (2006)	1,000	endangered	Brazil	
Kaiowa	Kaiova, Paï-Tavyterã	Tupían	Tupí-Guaranían	20,000 (2003)	most?	endangered	Brazil	Paraguay
Kamaiurá	Camaiurá	Tupían	Tupí-Guaranían	492 (2006)	400 (2008)	endangered	Brazil	
Karipuna dialect (part of the Kagwahiva languages)		Tupían	Tupí-Guaranían	14 (2004)	10	moribund	Brazil	
Kokama	Kocama, Cocama	Tupían	Tupí-Guaranían	9,000(2003)	5 (1993)	moribund	Brazil	Peru, Colombia
Mbyá		Tupían	Tupí-Guaranían	6,000 (2003)	6,000	potentially endangered	Brazil	Argentina, Paraguay
Ñandeva	Ava-Guaraní or Chiripá in Paraguay	Tupían	Tupí-Guaranían	13,000 (2008)	13,000	potentially endangered	Brazil	Paraguay
Nheengatu	Yeral, Língua Geral, Língua Geral Amazônica	Tupían	Tupí-Guaranían		3,000 (1977)	endangered	Brazil	Venezuela
Omagua	Kambeba, Kambewa, Cambeba	Tupían	Tupí-Guaranían	347	few?	moribund	Brazil	Peru
Parintintin	Kagwahiwa	Tupían	Tupí-Guaranían	284 (2006)	10	moribund	Brazil	
Tapirapé	Tapiʼirape	Tupían	Tupí-Guaranían	564 (2006)	564	endangered	Brazil	
Tembé	Timbé, Tenetehára, Turiwara	Tupían	Tupí-Guaranían	1,425 (2006)	60	seriously endangered	Brazil	
Tenharim	Kagwahiwa	Tupían	Tupí-Guaranían	699 (2006)	350	seriously endangered	Brazil	
Tupinamba	Coastal Tupi	Tupían	Tupí-Guaranían	2,590 (2006)	–	extinct	Brazil	
Uru-Eu-Wau-Wau	Amondawa, Jupaú, Kawahíb	Tupían	Tupí-Guaranían	183 (2006)	183	seriously endangered	Brazil	
Wajãpi	Wayãpy, Waiãpi, Guaiapi, Wayampi, Oyampi	Tupían	Tupí-Guaranían	905 (2008)	905	endangered	Brazil	French Guiana
Xetá	Hetá	Tupían	Tupí-Guaranían	86 (2006)	2 (2014)	moribund	Brazil	
Zoʼé	Poturu, Joʼé	Tupían	Tupí-Guaranían	177 (2003)	177	seriously endangered	Brazil	
Xipaya	Xipaia, Shipaya	Tupían	Tupí-Guaranían	595 (2002)	2 (2003)	moribund	Brazil	
Yudjá	Yuruna, Juruna, Jurûna	Tupían	Yuruna	362 (2006)	300?	seriously endangered	Brazil	
Witoto	Huitoto, Uitoto	Witotoan	Witotoan proper	42	?	possibly extinct (in Brazil)	Brazil	Peru, Colombia
Miranha	Mirãnha, Miraña	Witotoan	Boran	836 (2006)	–	extinct	Brazil	Colombia
Sánuma	Sanïma, Sánïma, Sánema	Yanomaman		462 (2006)	462	endangered	Brazil	Venezuela
Yanam	Ninam, Xirianá	Yanomaman		466 (2006)	466	seriously endangered	Brazil	Venezuela
Yanomam	Yanomae	Yanomaman		4,000 (2006)	4,000	potentially endangered	Brazil	Venezuela
Yanomami	Yanomamï, Yanomamõ, Yanomama, Yanoama	Yanomaman		6,000 (2006)	6,000	potentially endangered	Brazil	Venezuela
Chamacoco	Ishir	Zamucoan		1,572 (2002)	1,572	endangered	Brazil	Paraguay
Aikanã	Aikaná, Masaká, Kasupá, Huarí, Mondé, Tubarão	Isolate		200	150	seriously endangered	Brazil	
Atikum	Aticum, Wamoé	Isolate		5,852 (1999)	–	extinct (1960s)	Brazil	
Iranxe	Irantxe, Manoki	Isolate		276 (2006)	10	seriously endangered	Brazil	
Máku	Macu, Mako (of Auari)	Isolate		?	–	extinct (2000)	Brazil	
Kanoê	Canoé, Kapixaná	Isolate		95 (2002)	3	moribund	Brazil	
Kwazá	Koaiá, Coaiá, Quaia	Isolate		40 (2008)	25	seriously endangered	Brazil	
Myky	Menky, Munku	Isolate		80 (2000)	80?	seriously endangered	Brazil	
Ticuna	Tikuna, Tukuna, Magüa	Isolate		35,000 (2008)	35,000	potentially endangered	Brazil	Colombia, Peru
Trumai		Isolate		147 (2006)	51 (2007)	seriously endangered	Brazil	
Tuxá		Isolate		3,927	2 (1961)	extinct (1960s)	Brazil	
Arara do Aripuanã	Arara do Beiradão, Arara do Rio Branco	Unclassified		209 (2005)	–	extinct	Brazil	
Isolados do Massaco		Unclassified		100?	100?	seriously endangered	Brazil	
Isolados do Tanarú		Unclassified		1	–	extinct (2022)	Brazil	
Kambiwá	Cambiuá	Unclassified		2,820	2 (1961)	extinct	Brazil	
Kantaruré		Unclassified		493 (2006)	–	extinct	Brazil	
Kapinawá	Capinauá	Unclassified		3,294	–	extinct	Brazil	
Kariri	Cariri, Kipeá, Kiriri, Dzubukuá; Tumbalalá	Unclassified		? 1,469 (2006)	–	extinct	Brazil	
Kiriri	Katembri, Kariri, Kariri de Mirandela	Unclassified		1,612	1 (1960s)	extinct	Brazil	
Pankararu	Pancararu, Pankararé	Unclassified		6,515	–	extinct	Brazil	
Potiguara	Potyguara	Unclassified		11,424	–	extinct	Brazil	
Tapeba	Tapebano, Perna-de-Pau	Unclassified		5,741 (2006)	–	extinct	Brazil	
Tingui-Botó		Unclassified		302	–	extinct	Brazil	
Tremembé		Unclassified		2,049 (2006)	–	extinct	Brazil	
Truká		Unclassified		4,169 (2006)	–	extinct	Brazil	
Wassú		Unclassified		1,560 (2003)	–	extinct	Brazil	
Xokó	Chocó	Unclassified		364 (2006)	–	extinct	Brazil	
Kariri-Xocó		Unclassified		1,763 (2000)	–	extinct	Brazil	
Xukuru-Kariri		Unclassified		2,652 (2006)	–	extinct	Brazil	
Xukuru		Unclassified		9,064 (2006)	–	extinct (early 1960s)	Brazil	
Huilliche	Chesungun	Araucanian		2,000 (1982)	few elders	moribund	Chile	
Mapudungun	Mapuche	Araucanian		604,349	250,000	endangered	Chile	Argentina
Aymara		Aymaran		48,501	24,000	endangered	Chile	Bolivia, Peru, Argentina
Selkʼnam	Ona	Chonan		–	–	extinct	Chile	Argentina †
Quechua		Quechuan		6,175	1,000 ?	endangered	Chile	Argentina, Bolivia, Peru, Ecuador, Colombia
Kunza	Atacameño, Likan Antai, Ulipe, Lipe	Isolate		21,015	–	extinct (1960)	Chile	Argentina †, Bolivia †
Yahgan	Yámana, Háusi Kútə	Isolate		1685 / 70	–	extinct (2022)	Chile	Argentina †
Kawésqar	Qawasqar, Alacaluf	Isolate		2622 / 101	20	moribund	Chile	
Achagua		Arawakan		283 (2001)	283	seriously endangered	Colombia	Venezuela †
Baniva	Baniva del Guainía	Arawakan		?	few?	seriously endangered	Colombia	Venezuela, Brazil
Cabiyarí	Kabiyari, Kawiyarí, Kawiri, Cauyari, Cabuyari	Arawakan		311 (2001)	311	seriously endangered	Colombia	
Curripaco	Curripaco-Baniva, Kurripako, Baniva del Isana	Arawakan		7,827 (2001)	7,000?	potentially endangered	Colombia	Venezuela, Brazil
Wayuunaiki	Guajiro, Goajiro	Arawakan		149,827 (2001)	149,827	potentially endangered	Colombia	Venezuela
Piapoco	Piapoko, Tsáçe	Arawakan		4,926 (2001)	4,926	potentially endangered	Colombia	Venezuela
Tariana	Tariano	Arawakan		445 (2001)	0?	possibly extinct	Colombia	Brazil
Yucuna-Matapí	Yukuna	Arawakan		770 (221)	770	endangered	Colombia	Brazil?
Awa Pit	Awapit, Awá, Awa-Cuaiquer, Cuaiquer, Kwaiker	Barbacoan		15,364 (2001)	< 15,364	endangered	Colombia	Ecuador
Guambiano	Coconuco, Guanaca	Barbacoan		23,462 (2001)	23,462	endangered	Colombia	
Totoró		Barbacoan		4,130 (2001)	extinct	extinct	Colombia	
Carijona	Karijona, Tsahá	Cariban		307 (2001)	< 10	moribund	Colombia	
Opón-Carare		Cariban		?	–	extinct	Colombia	
Yuko	Yukpa, Yucpa, Japrería	Cariban		3,651 (2001)	3,651	potentially endangered	Colombia	Venezuela
Arhuaco	Ika, Ijka, Bíntukua	Chibchan		14,799 (2001)	14,799	potentially endangered	Colombia	
Barí	Motilón	Chibchan		3,617 (2001)	3,617	potentially endangered	Colombia	Venezuela
Chimila	Ette Taara	Chibchan		900 (2001)	900	endangered	Colombia	
Cuna	Kuna, Tule	Chibchan		1,231 (2001)	1,231	endangered	Colombia	PA
Damana	Sanka, Malayo, Arsario, Wiwa	Chibchan		1,922 (2001)	1,922	endangered	Colombia	
Kogui	Kawgian, Kággaba, Kogi	Chibchan		9,911 (2001)	9,911	potentially endangered	Colombia	
Uwa-Tunebo	Uw Kuwa, Uʼwa	Chibchan		7,231 (2001)	7,231	potentially endangered	Colombia	Venezuela †
Emberá	Pede Epenã, Epérã Pedée, Pede, Chamí, Catío, Katío, Sambú	Chocoan		88,747 (2001)	88,747?	potentially endangered	Colombia	Ecuador, PA
Waunana	Waunán, Waunméu, Waumeo, Chocó, Noanama	Chocoan		8,177	8,177	potentially endangered	Colombia	PA
Zenú		Chocoan		34,566	–	extinct	Colombia	
Cuiba	Cuiva, Kuiva	Guahiboan		2,445 (2001)	2,445	endangered	Colombia	Venezuela
Sikuani	Hiwi, Jive, Guahibo, Vichadeño, Amorúa, Tigrero	Guahiboan		23,006 (2001)	23,006	potentially endangered	Colombia	Venezuela
Guayabero	Mitua, Jiw	Guahiboan		1,118 (2001)	1,118	endangered	Colombia	
Hitnu	Jitnu, Macaguane-Hitnu	Guahiboan		441 (2001)	441?	endangered	Colombia	
Pepojivi	Playero, Guahibo Playero	Guahiboan		< 200 (1982)	< 200	seriously endangered	Colombia	Venezuela
Hup	Hupda, Hupdë	Nadahup		235	235	seriously endangered	Colombia	Brazil
Kakua	Cakua	Nadahup		220	220	seriously endangered	Colombia	
Nukak		Nadahup		390	390	endangered	Colombia	
Yuhup	Yuhuo Makú	Nadahup		200	200	seriously endangered	Colombia	Brazil
Yagua	Yawa	Peba-Yaguan		297 (2001)	297	endangered	Colombia	Peru
Inga	Ingano	Quechuan		19,079 (2001)	8,000	endangered	Colombia	
Piaroa		Sáliba-Piaroan		773 (2001)	773	endangered	Colombia	Venezuela
Sáliba	Sáliva	Sáliba-Piaroan		1,929 (2001)	< 1,929	endangered	Colombia	Venezuela
Bará	Waimaja, Waimasa, Waymasa, Waimaha, Barasano del Norte	Tucanoan		109 (2001)	109	seriously endangered	Colombia	Brazil
Barasana	Barasano, Barasano del Sur, Pãnerã, Banera Yae	Tucanoan		1,890 (1997)	1,890	endangered	Colombia	Brazil
Carapana	Karapana	Tucanoan		464 (2001)	464	endangered	Colombia	Brazil
Cubeo	Kubeo	Tucanoan		6,647 (2001)	6,647	potentially endangered	Colombia	Brazil
Desano		Tucanoan		2,457 (2001)	2,457	endangered	Colombia	Brazil
Koreguaje	Coreguaje, Koʼreuaju	Tucanoan		2,212 (2001)	2,212	endangered	Colombia	
Macaguaje	Makaguaje	Tucanoan		50 (2001)	0?	possibly extinct	Colombia	
Macuna	Makuna	Tucanoan		1,009 (2001)	1,009	endangered	Colombia	Brazil
Piratapuyo	Piratapuya	Tucanoan		630 (2001)	630	endangered	Colombia	Brazil
Pisamira	Pápiwa	Tucanoan		61 (2001)	25	seriously endangered	Colombia	Brazil
Siona	SionaSecoya	Tucanoan		734 (2001)	500 (2003)	endangered	Colombia	Ecuador, Peru
Siriano		Tucanoan		749 (2001)	749	endangered	Colombia	Brazil
Taiwano	Taibano, Eduria	Tucanoan		22 (2001)	22	moribund	Colombia	
Tanimuca-Letuama	Opaina, Ufaina, Retuarã	Tucanoan		1,952 (2001)	< 1,952	endangered	Colombia	
Tatuyo		Tucanoan		331 (2001)	331	endangered	Colombia	
Tucano		Tucanoan		6,996 (2001)	6,996	potentially endangered	Colombia	Brazil
Tuyuca		Tucanoan		642 (2001)	642	endangered	Colombia	Brazil
Wanano	Guanano, Kotiria	Tucanoan		1,395 (2001)	1,395	endangered	Colombia	Brazil
Yauna		Tucanoan		103 (2001)	103?	seriously endangered	Colombia	
Yurutí		Tucanoan		687 (2001)	687	endangered	Colombia	Brazil
Cocama	Kokama, Cocama, Cocamilla	Tupían	Tupí-Guaranían	792 (2001)	few semi-speakers	moribund	Colombia	Peru, Brazil
Nonuya		Witotoan	Witotoan proper	228 (2001)	2	moribund	Colombia	
Ocaina		Witotoan	Witotoan proper	137	137	seriously endangered	Colombia	Peru
Witoto	Witoto, Witoto Murui, Witoto Mïnïca, Witoto Muinane	Witotoan	Witotoan proper	7,343	7,343	potentially endangered	Colombia	Peru, Brazil †?
Bora		Witotoan	Boran	701 (2001)	<500	seriously endangered	Colombia	Peru
Miraña		Witotoan	Boran	715 (2001)	<100	seriously endangered	Colombia	Brazil
Muinane	Bora Muinane	Witotoan	Boran	547	50–100?	seriously endangered	Colombia	
Aʼingae	Cofán, Kofán	Isolate		1,143 (2000)	379 (2008)	endangered	Colombia	Ecuador
Andoke	Andoque	Isolate		597 (2001)	597	endangered	Colombia	
Kamsá	Camsá, Kamëntsa	Isolate		4,773 (2001)	4,773	potentially endangered	Colombia	
Nasa Yuwe	Paéz	Isolate		138,501 (2001)	60,000	endangered	Colombia	
Ticuna	Tikuna	Isolate		7,102 (2001)	7,102	potentially endangered	Colombia	Peru, Brazil
Tinigua		Isolate		1?	1 (2008)	moribund	Colombia	
Carabayo	Yuri	Unclassified		217 (2001)	217	seriously endangered	Colombia	
Wãnsöhöt	Puinave	Unclassified		6,604 (2001)	6,604	potentially endangered	Colombia	Venezuela
Awapit		Barbacoan		3,283	2,100	endangered	Ecuador	Colombia
Chaʼpalaa	Chaʼpalaachi, Chachi, Cayapa	Barbacoan		5,465	5,871	endangered	Ecuador	
Tsafiqui	Tsafiki, Tsáchila, Tsachela, Colorado	Barbacoan		1,484	1,872	endangered	Ecuador	
Epera Pedede	Êpera, Epena Pedee, Siapedie, Emberá, Emberá del Sur, Emberá Chami	Chocoan		65	52	seriously endangered	Ecuador	Colombia
Achuar-Shiwiara	Achiar Chicham	Jivaroan		2,404	2,943	endangered	Ecuador	Peru
Shiwiar Chicham		Jivaroan		612	579	endangered	Ecuador	
Shuar	Chicham	Jivaroan		52,697	42,261	potentially endangered	Ecuador	
Quichua	Cañar, Azuay, Cotopaxo, Tungurahua, Chimborazo, Imbabura, Loza, Napo, Pastaza, and Salasaca dialects	Quechuan		408,395	451,783	potentially endangered	Ecuador	Argentina, Chile, Bolivia, Peru, Colombia
Secoya	Siona-Secoya, Pai Coca	Tucanoan		240	85	seriously endangered	Ecuador	Colombia, Peru
Pai Coca	Siona, Kokakañú	Tucanoan		304	260	seriously endangered	Ecuador	
Teteté		Tucanoan		–	–	extinct (1974)	Ecuador	
Záparo	Kayapi	Zaparoan		346	176	seriously endangered	Ecuador	
Aʼingae	Cofán	Isolate		1,044	638	endangered	Ecuador	Colombia
Huao	Wao, Waorani, Waotededo, Wao Tiriro, Auca, Sabela	Isolate		1,534	1,616	endangered	Ecuador	
Lokono	Arawak	Arawakan		15,500 (2000)	1,500	seriously endangered	Guyana	Suriname, French Guiana, Venezuela
Wapishana		Arawakan		6,900 (2000)	< 6,900	endangered	Guyana	Brazil
Mawayana		Arawakan		?	few rememberers	extinct	Guyana	Suriname, Brazil †
Akawayo	Kapon	Cariban		5,000 (2000)	< 5,000	endangered	Guyana	Venezuela, Brazil
Arekuna	Pemon	Cariban		400–500	400–500	endangered	Guyana	Venezuela, Brazil
Kariʼna	Carib	Cariban		3,000 (2000)	few hundred	seriously endangered	Guyana	French Guiana, Suriname, Venezuela, Brazil
Makushi	Pemon	Cariban		7,750 (2000)	< 7,750	endangered	Guyana	Venezuela, Brazil
Patamona	Kapon	Cariban		5,000 (2000)	< 5,000	endangered	Guyana	Venezuela, Brazil
Waiwai		Cariban		240	240	seriously endangered	Guyana	Brazil
Warao		Isolate		5,000 (2000)	few	seriously endangered	Guyana	Venezuela, Brazil
Taruma	Saluma, Saloema, Charuma	Unclassified		?	few	moribund	Guyana	Suriname †, Brazil †
Lokono	Arawak	Arawakan		2,000	500-700	endangered	Suriname	French Guiana, Guyana, Venezuela
Mawayana		Arawakan		60-80	< 5	moribund	Suriname	
Akuriyo		Cariban		40-50	3	moribund	Suriname	
Kariʼna	Carib	Cariban		3,000	1,200	seriously endangered	Suriname	Guyana, French Guiana, Venezuela, Brazil
Sikïiyana		Cariban		60-70	< 12	moribund	Suriname	
Trio		Cariban		1,300	1,300	endangered	Suriname	Brazil
Tunayana	Katuena	Cariban		80-90	10	moribund	Suriname	
Wayana		Cariban		450	450	endangered	Suriname	French Guiana, Brazil
Arawak	Lokono	Arawakan		1,500	375	seriously endangered	French Guiana	Suriname, Guyana, Venezuela
Palikur		Arawakan		1,500	< 1500	endangered	French Guiana	Brazil
Aparaí		Cariban		?	few	seriously endangered	French Guiana	Brazil
Galibi	Kariʼna, Kaliʼna	Cariban		4,000	2,400	endangered	French Guiana	Suriname, Guyana, Venezuela, Brazil
Wayana		Cariban		1,000	1,000	endangered	French Guiana	Suriname, Brazil
Emérillon	Teko	Tupían	Tupí-Guaranían	400	400	endangered	French Guiana	
Wayãpi	Wajãpi, Wayampi	Tupían	Tupí-Guaranían	750	750	endangered	French Guiana	Brazil
Angaité		Enlhet-Enenlhet		3,730	1,030	endangered	Paraguay	
Enlhet	Enlhet Norte, Enslet, Enthlit, Enlhet-Lengua, Lengua	Enlhet-Enenlhet		7,316	6,439	endangered	Paraguay	
Enxet	Enxet Sur	Enlhet-Enenlhet		5,930	3,842	endangered	Paraguay	
Guaná	Kashika	Enlhet-Enenlhet		258	29	seriously endangered	Paraguay	
Sanapaná	Saʼapan, Kasnapan	Enlhet-Enenlhet		2,327	984	endangered	Paraguay	
Toba-Enenlhet	including Toba-Maskoy	Enlhet-Enenlhet		1,509	1,253	endangered	Paraguay	
Toba-Maskoy		Enlhet-Enenlhet		764	12	moribund	Paraguay	
Toba-Qom	Qom-Lik, Emok-Lik, Takshika, Toba in Argentina	Guaicuruan		1,499	1,183	endangered	Paraguay	Argentina
Maká	Maca	Matacoan		1,307	1,042	endangered	Paraguay	
Manjuy	Manjui, Chorote in Argentina; three varieties: Iyoʼwuhwa, Iyojwaʼja [Yohwaha], and Montaraz [Wikinawos, Manjuy]	Matacoan		452	365	endangered	Paraguay	Argentina
Nivaclé	Nivaklé, Chulupí, Ashluslay	Matacoan		12,169	10,109	endangered	Paraguay	Argentina
Aché	Axé, Aché-Guayaki, Guayakí	Tupían	Tupí-Guaranían	1,242	911	endangered	Paraguay	
Ava-Guaraní	Chiripá, Ava-Chiripá, Chiripá-Guaraní, Avakatu-ete, Ñandeva in Brazil	Tupían	Tupí-Guaranían	13,872	6,308	endangered	Paraguay	Brazil
Guaraní-Ñandeva	Ñandeva, Tapieté	Tupían	Tupí-Guaranían	2,021	1,550	endangered	Paraguay	Argentina, Bolivia
Guaraní Occidental	Ava-Guaraní in Argentina, Guaraní (Chiriguano) in Bolivia	Tupían	Tupí-Guaranían	2,359	574	seriously endangered	Paraguay	Argentina, Bolivia
Mbyá		Tupían	Tupí-Guaranían	14,624	10,016	endangered	Paraguay	Argentina, Brazil
Pãi-Tavyterã	Kaiova, Kaiowa, Avá	Tupían	Tupí-Guaranían	13,391	6,364	endangered	Paraguay	Brazil
Ayoreo	Moro, Pyta Jovai	Zamucoan		2,100	1,756	endangered	Paraguay	Bolivia
Chamacoco	Ishir, Yshyrö; 2 varieties: Ybytoso, Ybytoso	Zamucoan					Paraguay	
Ybytoso		Zamucoan		1,553	1,174	endangered	Paraguay	Brazil
Tamárâho		Zamucoan		106	85	endangered	Paraguay	Brazil
Madija	Madiha, Kulina, Kurina	Arawan		300	300	endangered	Peru	Brazil
Asháninca	Asháninka	Arawakan		88,703 (2007)	88,703	potentially endangered	Peru	
Ashéninca	Ashéninka, Axininca, Ashéninca Pajonal	Arawakan		20,000	20,000	potentially endangered	Peru	
Campa Caquinte	Poyenisati	Arawakan		500	500	endangered	Peru	
Chamicuro	Chamekolo	Arawakan		126 (1993)	8 (2008)	moribund	Peru	
Iñapari		Arawakan		68 (1993)	4 (1998)	moribund	Peru	
Machiguenga	Matsiguenga, Matsigenka, Niagantsi	Arawakan		8,679 (1993)	5,000	endangered	Peru	
Nanti	Cugapacori, Kugapakori	Arawakan		450	450	endangered	Peru	
Nomatsiguenga	Inato, Inaʼo, Inthome, Intsome	Arawakan		5,531 (1993)	5,531	potentially endangered	Peru	
Resígaro		Arawakan		14 (1993)	1 (2017)	moribund	Peru	
Yanesha	Amuesha	Arawakan		10,000	8,000	potentially endangered	Peru	
Yine	Piro, Apurinã, Yinerï Tokanï	Arawakan		2,553 (1993)	2,553	potentially endangered	Peru	
Aymara		Aymaran		434,372 (2007)	< 434,372	potentially endangered	Peru	
Cauqui		Aymaran		?	9 (2005)	moribund	Peru	
Jaqaru	or Cauqui	Aymaran		3,000?	725?	endangered	Peru	
Shawi	Chayahuita	Cahuapanan		21,424 (2007)	14,000	endangered	Peru	
Shiwilu	Jebero, Xebero	Cahuapanan		642 (1993)	< 30	seriously endangered	Peru	
Harakmbut	Harakmbut Hate, Harakmbut Ate, Amarakaeri	Harakmbut-Katukinan		1,206 (1993)	1,206	endangered	Peru	
Cholón	or Seeptsá	Hibitocholonan		?	2 (1986)	possibly extinct	Peru	
Achuar-Shiwiar	Shiwiar-Maina	Jivaroan		2,500 (2008)	2,500	endangered	Peru	Ecuador
Awajún	Aguajún, Ahuajún, Aguaruna	Jivaroan		55,366 (2007)	55,366	potentially endangered	Peru	
Huambisa		Jivaroan		8,000	8,000	potentially endangered	Peru	
Amahuaca	Ameuhaque, Amaguaco	Pano-Tacanan	Panoan	247 (1993)	100?	seriously endangered	Peru	Brazil
Capanahua	Capabaquebo, Kapanawa, Capacho	Pano-Tacanan	Panoan	275 (2006)	100?	seriously endangered	Peru	
Cashibo-Cacataibo	Uni	Pano-Tacanan	Panoan	2,191 (1993)	2,191	endangered	Peru	
Cashinahua	Caxinahua, Kaxinawa, Hantxa Kuin,	Pano-Tacanan	Panoan	957 (1993)	957	endangered	Peru	Brazil
Matsés	Matsés-Mayoruna, Mayoruna	Pano-Tacanan	Panoan	2,500	2,500	endangered	Peru	Brazil
Nahua	Yura, Yora, Yurahahua	Pano-Tacanan	Panoan	450	450	endangered	Peru	Bolivia
Sharanahua	Marinahua, Mastanahua, Parquenahua	Pano-Tacanan	Panoan	438	<438	endangered	Peru	Brazil
Shipibo-Konibo	Shipibo-Conibo, Shipibo	Pano-Tacanan	Panoan	22,517 (2007)	22,517	endangered	Peru	
Wariapano	Huariapano, Panobo	Pano-Tacanan	Panoan	?	–	probably extinct (1991)	Peru	
Yaminahua		Pano-Tacanan	Panoan	400	400	endangered	Peru	Bolivia, Brazil
Ese Ejja	Huarayo, Guarayo, Chama	Pano-Tacanan	Tacanan	782 (1993)	782	endangered	Peru	Bolivia
Yagua	Yawa, Iahua	Peba-Yaguan		5,000	4,000	endangered	Peru	Colombia
Quechua		Quechuan		3,262,137 (2007)	< 3,262,137	potentially endangered	Peru	Ecuador, Bolivia, Chile, Argentina
Orejón	Maihuna, Coto, Payagua, Tutapi	Tucanoan		300	100	seriously endangered	Peru	
Secoya	Siona-Secoya	Tucanoan		329 (1993)	329	endangered	Peru	Ecuador
Cocama-Cocamilla	Xibitoana, Huallaga, Pampadeque	Tupían	Tupí-Guaranían	10,705	1,000	seriously endangered	Peru	Colombia, Brazil
Omagua		Tupían	Tupí-Guaranían	630 (1976)	2 (2010)	moribund	Peru	Brazil
Huitoto	Witoto	Witotoan	Witotoan proper	3,000	1,000	endangered	Peru	Colombia, Brazil †?
Ocaina		Witotoan	Witotoan proper	150	50	seriously endangered	Peru	Colombia
Bora		Witotoan	Boran	3,000	2,000	endangered	Peru	Colombia, Brazil
Andoa-Shimigae		Zaparoan		?	2 (2008)	moribund	Peru	Ecuador
Arabela	Chiripuno	Zaparoan		500	50 (2001)	seriously endangered	Peru	
Cahuarano	Cahuarana	Zaparoan		?	5 (1975)	extinct	Peru	
Iquito	Amacacore, Quiturran, Puca-Uma	Zaparoan		500	25–50	seriously endangered	Peru	
Candoshi	Candoshi-Shapra	Isolate		1,586 (1993)	1,586	endangered	Peru	
Munichi	Muniche	Isolate		?	8 (2008)	moribund	Peru	
Ticuna		Isolate		8,000	8,000	potentially endangered	Peru	Brazil, Colombia
Urarina	Kacha Ere, Shimacu, Itucale, Cimarrón	Isolate		2,000 (2003)	2,000	potentially endangered	Peru	
Vacacocha	Aushiri	Isolate		?	2? (2008)	moribund	Peru	
Aguano		Unclassified (Arawakan)?		40 families (1959)	–	extinct	Peru	
Culle	Culli	Unclassified		–	–	extinct (1950s)	Peru	
Mashco	Mashco-Piro	Unclassified		200–600	200–600	endangered	Peru	Brazil
Taushiro	Pinche	Unclassified		20	1 (2008)	moribund	Peru	
Achagua		Arawakan		–	–	extinct	Venezuela	Colombia
Añu	Paraujano	Arawakan		11,205 (2001)	20	seriously endangered	Venezuela	
Baniva	Baníwa, Banibo, Baniva-Yavitero, Baniva del Guainía	Arawakan		2,408 (2001)	608	endangered	Venezuela	Colombia, Brazil
Baré		Arawakan		2,815 (2001)	239 / few	moribund	Venezuela	Brazil
Kurripako	Curripaco, Wakuénai, Baniva-Kurripako, Baniwa del Isana	Arawakan		4,925 (2001)	3,743	potentially endangered	Venezuela	Colombia, Brazil
Lokono	Arhwak, Aruaco	Arawakan		428 (2001)	130	seriously endangered	Venezuela	French Guiana, Suriname, Guyana
Mandahuaca	Mandawaka	Arawakan		?	–	possibly extinct	Venezuela	Brazil
Piapoko	Piapoco, Tsáçe	Arawakan		1,939 (2001)	1,745	potentially endangered	Venezuela	Colombia
Warekena	Guarequena	Arawakan		513 (2001)	160	seriously endangered	Venezuela	Brazil
Wayuunaiki	Guajiro, Wayuu	Arawakan		293,777 (2001)	293,777	potentially endangered	Venezuela	Colombia
Yavitero	Baniva-Yavitero, Banibo	Arawakan		?	1 (2000)	possibly extinct	Venezuela	
Akawayo	Kapon	Cariban		245 (2001)	180	endangered	Venezuela	Guyana, Brazil
Chaima		Cariban		4,084 (2001)	63	seriously endangered	Venezuela	
Eʼñepa	Panare, Mapoyo	Cariban		4,269 (2001)	4,184	potentially endangered	Venezuela	
Kariña	Kariñá, Kariʼna, Galibi	Cariban		16,686 (2001)	< 5,000	endangered	Venezuela	French Guiana, Suriname, Guyana
Kumanagoto		Cariban		553 (2001)	49	seriously endangered	Venezuela	
Makushi	Macushi, Makuxi	Cariban		83 (2001)	not known	endangered	Venezuela	Guyana, Brazil
Mapoyo	Mapoio, Wánai	Cariban		365 (2001)	12	moribund	Venezuela	
Patamona	Kapón	Cariban		200	200?	endangered	Venezuela	Guyana, Brazil
Pemon	Arekuna, Taurepan(g), Kamarakoto	Cariban		27,157 (2001)	23,083	potentially endangered	Venezuela	Guyana, Brazil
Pémono		Cariban		?	1	possibly extinct	Venezuela	
Piritugoto		Cariban		236 (2001)	50	seriously endangered	Venezuela	
Yawarana	Yavarana, Yabarana	Cariban		292 (2001)	151	seriously endangered	Venezuela	
Yeꞌkuana	Yeʼkwana, Deʼkwana, Maquiritare, Maiongong	Cariban		6,523 (2001)	6,200	endangered	Venezuela	Brazil
Yukpa	Yucpa, Japrería	Cariban		7,522 (2001)	< 7,522	potentially endangered	Venezuela	Colombia
Barí	Motilón	Chibchan		1,520 (1992)	1,520	endangered	Venezuela	Colombia
Tunebo	Uwa-Tunebo	Chibchan		?	?	possibly extinct	Venezuela	Colombia
Kuiva	Cuiva, Cuiba	Guahiboan		454 (2001)	440	endangered	Venezuela	Colombia
Hiwi	Jivi, Guahibo, Sikuani	Guahiboan		14,750 (2001)	12,000	potentially endangered	Venezuela	Colombia
Pepojivi	Playero, Guahibo Playero	Guahiboan		200	200	seriously endangered	Venezuela	Colombia
Wirö	Wirú, Maco, Mako	Sáliba-Piaroan		1,130 (2001)	most	endangered	Venezuela	
Piaroa	Wothüha, Wotjüja, Wuʼtjuja	Sáliba-Piaroan		14,494 (2001)	13,000	endangered	Venezuela	Colombia
Sáliba	Sáliva	Sáliba-Piaroan		265 (2001)	36	seriously endangered	Venezuela	Colombia
Yeral	Geral, Nheengatu, Ñengatú	Tupían	Tupí-Guaranían	1,294 (2001)	650	endangered	Venezuela	Brazil
Ninam	Yanam	Yanomaman		?	?	seriously endangered	Venezuela	Brazil
Sanïma	Sanema, Sanuma	Yanomaman		3,035 (2001)	3,035	potentially endangered	Venezuela	Brazil
Yanomae	Yanomam, Yanomamë, Yanomama	Yanomaman		?	?	potentially endangered	Venezuela	Brazil
Yanomamï	Yanoamï, Yanoamae	Yanomaman		12,234 (2001)	12,234	potentially endangered	Venezuela	Brazil
Hodï	Hoti, Jodi, Ho	Isolate		767 (2001)	767	endangered	Venezuela	
Pumé	Yaruro	Isolate		8,222	7,400	endangered	Venezuela	
Sapé	Kariana, Kaliana, Caliana	Isolate		20 (2008)	few elders	moribund	Venezuela	
Uruak	Arutani, Awake	Isolate		29 (2001)	29	seriously endangered	Venezuela	Brazil?
Warao		Isolate		36,028 (2001)	32,400	potentially endangered	Venezuela	Guyana
Puinave	Wãnsöhöt	Unclassified		1,307 (2001)	550	endangered	Venezuela	Colombia

== See also ==
- Lenguas indígenas de América (Spanish Wikipedia appendix)
- Languages of South America
  - Indigenous languages of South America
    - Amazonian languages
    - List of indigenous languages of Argentina
    - List of unclassified languages of South America
    - List of extinct languages of South America
      - Extinct languages of the Marañón River basin
- Indigenous languages of the Americas
  - Classification of indigenous languages of the Americas

By ISO 639-3 code
Enter an ISO code to find the corresponding language article.
