= Mamaindê language =

Nambikwaran language spoken in Brazil

Mamaindê
- Northern Nambikwara
- Native to: Brazil
- Region: Mato Grosso
- Native speakers: 250 (2009) to 340 (2007–2010)
- Language family: Nambikwaran: Mamaindê

Language codes
- ISO 639-3: wmd
- Glottolog: mama1278
- ELP: Mamaindé

Mamaindê is a Nambikwaran language spoken in the Mato Grosso state of Brazil, in the very north of the indigenous reserve, Terra Indígena Vale do Guaporé, between the Pardo and Cabixi Rivers. In the southern part of the reserve, speakers of Sabanê and Southern Nambikwara are found.

== History ==
At the start of the 1900s, there were an estimated 3000 Mamaindê members. Their endangerment arose as a result of various intertribal wars and massacres in the 30s and 40s as well as measles outbreaks, leaving them with only 50 Mamaindê members by 1965 according to SIL workers Peter and Shirley Kingston. Their population began to rebuild in the 90s, according to SIL workers Dave and Julie Eberhard, when they traced a steady increase in population size and found that their community had grown to 136 members by 1999.

Traditionally located in the Cabixi river region, the Mamaindê people belong to the Nambikwara language family. This language family was extensively studied by American Anthropologist and Ethnologist, David Price, who describes the discovery of gold in the Coxipo river in 1719 as the root for the initial presence of Portuguese and other non-indigenous people in the Mato Grosso region. Being a variety of Northern Nambikwara, the Mamaindê indigenous group, specifically, only came into contact with Brazilian society about three generations ago. It wasn’t until 1911 that the Portuguese actually starting to settle in the Nambikwara area, following the spread of the telegraph line throughout Brazil. Though contact between the indigenous and non-indigenous was both violent and peaceful, measles and massacres ultimately began to exterminate most Nambiwaran tribes. This genocide, which occurred in a span of 30 years, paved the way for the assimilation of the survivors to local Brazilian populations (especially after losing their land), and eventually led to the creation of pidgins/dialects between their indigenous languages and Portuguese.

With a strenuous process, the Mamaindê were one of the few tribes able to regain "legal title of their land". Being initially given a heavily impoverished reserve in 1961, survival was especially wearisome. They decided to walk back to their original land anticipating better living conditions, though lost 30% of their already decaying population on their 400km journey. In times of desperation and in hopes of giving their offspring a better chance of survival, Mamaindê mothers would even travel to the Cuiaba-Porto Velho highway to give babies away to truck drivers and passerby’s. During these arduous times when their population was down to 50 people and on the path to extinction, SIL International, a non-profit language development organization, became involved in their communities. This organization brought Protestant missionaries into Mamaindê communities, which was unlike most Nambikwaran groups who were mainly in contact with Catholic missionaries. Rising familiarity with the bible led to part of it being translated into the Mamaindê language. Young generations were often encouraged to study in missionary schools located away from their villages where they were formally educated in practicing religion in their villages and the norms of "white people’s way of life". Pushing for sustainability and working towards community development, SIL was able to kick-start their advancement in preserving the Mamaindê culture, language and population.

== Classificatiom ==
The language family of which Mamaindê belongs to is Nambikwara (also spelled Nambicuara or Nambiquara). Speakers of languages from this family have once or currently lived in the Chapada dos Parecis, the Guaporé Valley and the northern region between the Iquê River and the Cabixi and Piolho rivers. Nambikwara languages can be split into three divisions: Sabanê, Northern Nambikwara and Southern Nambikwara. Languages within each division are mutually intelligible, and are considered dialects of them. Multilingualism is common among Nambikwara that live in the north areas due to heavy contact with different Nambikwara languages as well as Portuguese. As previously mentioned, according to David Price, contact between Portuguese speakers and speakers of Nambikwara languages initially occurred when Portuguese began travelling onto Nambikwara territory in search of gold.

== Documentation ==
=== Work on Nambikwara ===
David Price contributed greatly to research on the Nambikwara community and focused his fieldwork on them for his doctoral dissertation in anthropology (1967-1970). He worked with/for "the government agency in charge indigenous people", FUNAI, to aid the Nambikwara community. In addition, Price wrote "The Nambiquara Linguistic Family" which classified 6 of the family’s languages. His contribution to the Nambikwara documentation didn’t end there, as he also wrote the published article "Pareci, Cabixi, Nambikwara: a Case study in the Western classification of native peoples" (Journal de la Societe des Americanistes. 69:129-48, 1983). The book that dives into each specific Nambikwara group and its history called "Before the Bulldozer", was also written by Price in 1989.

Nambikwara has various other linguistic literature available as well. A descriptive grammar can be found for Nambikwara; Menno Kroeker wrote the journal article "A Descriptive Grammar of Nambikuara" in 2001 which was published by The University of Chicago Press. This work includes information on the languages in the Nambikwara family in terms of Grammatical Clauses, Verbs, Nouns, Vowels, Phrases, Syllables, Adjectivals, Consonants, etc. This texts generally explains the grammar on Nambikwara. According to Klein and Stark in the book they edited titled "South American Indian Languages: Retrospect and Prospect", Nambikwara also has phonological descriptions and a pedagogical grammar, as well as paper on the languages’ phonological details.

=== Work on Mamaindê ===
Beginning in the 1960s, SIL International (formerly Summer Institute of Linguistics, Inc.) worked among the Mamaindê which could be considered a documentation project of the language. Their documentations on Mamaindê specifically includes the following: Peter Kingston’s unpublished master’s thesis on Mamaindê repetition and other discourse features (Reading University, 1974), Kingston’s "Sufixos referenciais e o elemento nominal na lingua Mamaindê" on verb and noun morphology (published in Serie Linguistica 5:31-81, Brasilia, SIL), David Price’s book "Before the Bulldozer" in which Mamaindê history is covered in one section (1989), Paul Aspelin’s dissertation on Mamaindê food exchange (1979), Dave Eberhard’s published phonology thesis on Mamaindê stress (1995) and his two articles on prosodic features; a paper on Mamaindê nasals (on the Rutgers Optimality Archives website) and a paper on Mamaindê tone (in the proceedings of the Symposium on Andean and Amazonian Languages and Cultures, 2004, Vrije Universitieit, Amsterdam).

Other research conducted with the Mamaindê includes Joan Miller’s research beginning in 2002. Miller has a PhD in Social Anthropology (CAPES Concept 7) from the Federal University of Rio de Janeiro, UFRJ, Brazil and has work entitled The Things. Body decorations and the notion of person for the Mamaindê (Nambiquara) 2007. She conducted a research project from 2007 - 2008 called Objectivization and subjectivation regimes in Amazonia: a study of the body adornments of Mamainde (Nambiquara). This project works to include the Mamainde ethnographic analysis in the debate about regimes of objectification and subjectivation in Amazonia and other ethnographic contexts such as Melanesia (Curriculo Lattes).

Edilberto Fernandes Syryczyk has a PhD in Science and Mathematics Education, REAMEC - UFMT Program (2016) that reaches along many categories including Indigenous Mathematical Knowledge, Indigenous Ethnomathematics, Indigenous Culture, Ethnology of Nambikwara, Mathematical Knowledge in Mamaindê. He has contributed to an extension project called Arts & Culture Yucotindu that aims to promote the revitalization of the Mamainde culture. The project works to foster spaces of cultural knowledge exchange among the Mamaindê for example by valorizing the tradition of hand crafted utensils (Curriculo Lattes).

== Varieties ==
Among the Nambikwaran languages, at least Northern (Mamainde), Southern (Nambikwara), and Sabane are mutually unintelligible. Mamainde, however, is a dialect cluster, and its varieties are sometimes considered distinct languages. The following distinctions are made by Eberhard (2009). Population figures are those of Ethnologue 16, dated 2007:

- Mamaindê proper (including Nagarotê, 330 speakers)
- Latundê (20)
- Lakondê (1)
- Tawandê (or Da’wan’du; unattested and speakers unknown)
- Yalakalore (extinct and unattested)
- Yalapmunde (Alapmunte; extinct and unattested)

Yelelihre is another unattested Nambikwaran variety.

== Geographic distribution ==
Anonby & Eberhard (2008) list geographic locations for the following 3 Northern Nambikuara language varieties.

- The Mamaindê (population: 200) live in Capitão Pedro, Mato Grosso, a village located near Vilhena, Rondônia.
- The Negarotê (population: 100) live in a main village near the town of Comodoro, Mato Grosso, as well as another village close to the town of Nova Alvorada, Mato Grosso.
- The Latundê (population: 20) live in the Tubarão-Latundê reserve, located about 150 kilometres west of Vilhena, Rondônia. The reserve has 3 villages.
  - Rio do Ouro: mostly ethnic Aikanã
  - Gleba: contains ethnic Aikanã, Kwazá, and Latundê
  - Barroso: mostly ethnic Latundê

== Phonology ==
The following description is based on Mamaindê proper.

=== Vowels ===
Mamaindê has 20 vowels:

	Front	Central	Back
High	i, ĩ, ḭ, ḭ̃		u, ũ, ṵ, ṵ̃ ʊ
Mid	e, ẽ, ḛ	ə	o, õ, o̰
Low		a, ã, a̰, ã̰	

=== Consonants ===
Mamaindê has 14 contrastive consonants:

		Bilabial	Alveolar	Palatal	Velar	Glottal
Plosive	unspirated	p	t		k	ʔ
Plosive	aspirated	pʰ	tʰ		kʰ	
Fricative			s			h
Nasal		m	n			
Lateral			l			
Glide		w		j		

== Morphology ==
The aspects of morphology for Mamaindê include morphological typology, morphological processes and grammatical categories. Under the topic of morphological typology, Mamaindê is highly polysynthetic and an agglutinative language. Under the topic of morphological processes, reduplication is a highly present process occurring in various environments as well as in many forms (for example suffixed reduplication, prefixed reduplication and exceptional cases). Another morphological process in Mamaindê is head-marking in which possession is marked "on the head of the noun phrase (the possessed) and not on the dependent (the possessor)". The grammatical categories in Mamaindê consist of types of nouns, types of verbs, adverbs, conjunctions and interjections.

=== Pronouns ===
Mamaindê includes three person pronouns [ta̰i], [wa̰i] and [ha̰i]; first, second and third person respectively. These are used to refer to all basic grammatical relations including subject, object (as exemplified in a) and indirect objects (as exemplified in b). These pronouns can also be modified by noun classifiers (/-soʔka/), gender markers, plural markers, demonstrative markers and final nominal suffixes (/-ãni/), as exemplified in (b), as no distinct set of pronouns designate these differences.

ta-jahon-tu ta̰i toh-Ø-aʔ-wa
PS1-old.man-FNS PN1 like-S3-NEG-DECL
My old man doesn’t like me.

ta-sawis-anãʔã hiksamañ-ta-latʰa-Ø-wa.
PS1-grandchild-PL long.for-O1-S3-PRS-DECL.
I miss my grandchildren.

hãi nalik-ka-hensoʔ na-naʔ-Ø-wa.
PN3 remember-OBL-ALWAYS COP-S1-PRS-DECL.
I remember (about) them all the time.

=== Noun Classifiers ===
Without forming an actual morphological unit with the noun, noun classifiers are free, though exist in the same noun phrase of the noun they qualify. These lexical items are a distinctive trait of Mamaindê and all Nambikwara languages, being "a crucial component of the morphology". A set of 24 noun classifiers exist in Mamaindê; some required (when the classifier changes the meaning of the base, for example) and others optional due to redundancy. In this language, the classifier is obligatory "in such a construction" as nouns are frequently characterized by physical attributes (shape, state, function, etc.). They are ultimately distributed into 3 functional categories: noun modifiers as in (a), anaphoric substitutes as in (b) and verbal nominalizers as in (c). These functional categories "demonstrate the pervasive and productive nature of this morphological class".

nũsa-halo-kʰu
PS1.PL-land-NCL.LAND
our land

nakatos-tu na-halo-kʰu un-jeʔ-latha-Ø-wa.
Negarotê-FNS PS3-land-NCL.LAND far-EMP-S3-PRS-DECL
The land of the Negarotê is very far away.

nãinʔtoh, na-kʰu naih ʔaḭ-ten-aʔ-Ø-wa.
CN.EVEN.SO PS3-NCL.LAND still go-DES-1P-PRS-DECL
Even so, I’m still intending to go to their land.

mãn-kalo-tu
be.hot-NCL.FLAT.THING-FNS
flat hot thing/cloth/clothes

=== Suffix Reduplication ===
In Mamaindê, suffixed reduplication occurs in nouns and verbs. The two types are monosyllabic suffixes and disyllabic suffixes. The two types exist because either can occur when affixed to disyllabic root. The suffixed reduplicates do not, in Mamaindê, copy the same syllable structure as the root. Codas never copy therefore suffix reduplication only occurs when there is one mora in the syllable. The two templates and examples are displayed below.

==== Suffixing Reduplication Templates ====
MONOSYLLABIC: σμ

DISYLLABIC: σμ σμ

Monosyllabic Suffixed Reduplication
base	reduplicate	output	
	σμ		
/sami/	s a m i	[samimi]	'whisper’

Disyllabic Suffixed Reduplication
base	reduplicate	output	
	σμ σμ		
/kaluʔ/	k a l u ʔ	[kaluʔkalu]	‘ant: type’

== Syntax ==
=== The Impersonal Construction ===
Mamaindê is a head-final language with both transitive and intransitive clauses. Transitive clauses take the structure of SOV and intransitive clauses take the order of SV. Mamaindê has a construction called the impersonal construction. In this construction, a dummy/semantically-empty third person subject is brought in and the first person subject is regulated to an oblique status. The impersonal construction affects the entire clause because it causes changes in verb-argument relations. Impersonal constructions are transitive on the surface level yet intransitive at the semantic level (except for a few exception that are semantically transitive).

Impersonal constructions in Mamainde are similar to the absolute case in ergative systems, however certain distinctions still mark it as its own. They are similar in the way that they share the characteristic of using an object marker to mark the subject of certain intransitives therefore creating a formal link between the subject of intransitives and the object of transitive’s. This doesn’t occur with all intransitives in Mamaindê (only occurs with emotive verbs), therefore it is considered a split-intransitive system.

There are five major distinctions that the impersonal construction in Mamaindê holds that separates it from split-ergativity. Firstly, impersonals are identified by markings on verbs rather than nouns. Secondly, impersonals link the subject of intransitives with the object of transitive via morphology in which the underlying subject is marked as an object on the surface. Ergative-absolutive systems usually just tackle these situations with simple surface marking. A third distinction is that the impersonal construction encodes the indirect object on the verb. Fourthly, a requirement of impersonal constructions is introducing a dummy third person which is not necessary for the absolutive case. Lastly, while the absolutive case can be used with any person as the agent of a verb, impersonal is only distinguishable with non-third person agents.

Impersonal clause:

to̰-ta-latʰa-Ø-wa
sick-O1-S3-PRS-DECL
It is sick to me (I am sick)

Impersonal clause displaying less frequent possibility of being transitive on semantic level:

takalah-ta-latʰa-Ø-wa
to.dislike-O1-S3-PRS-DECL
It is not liked by me (I don’t like it)

== Semantics ==
=== Plurality ===
In Mamaindê, no distinct set of pronouns designates number, rather it is actually indicated by a plural affix as demonstrated in (a) where child becomes children. The number marker /-nãʔã/ is adjoined to the pronoun strictly when plurality is the focus as in (b). In this particular example, the pronoun in the second sentence is singular although grandchildren (being the referent) is plural, given the first sentence. Accordingly, when this plural affix is absent, one is to assume the singularity of the noun or simply that number is not specifically in focus within the utterance. This pattern of default values, as exemplified by Eberhard findings on Mamaindê, is also found with gender and temporal markers.

In addition to the lack of an independent morpheme for plurals in this language, there is also "no plural equivalent for the second and third person possessives". Instead, adding the plural marker on the pronoun (if necessary) will exhibit plurality, as these possessives continue to use the appropriate singular form as shown in (c). In (d), this number marker follows the noun classifier, giving an insight into Mamaindê’s morpheme order on pronouns. Beginning with the pronoun, it is then followed by the noun classifier /-soʔka/ and gender marker /-ta/, and finally ends with the number marker.

wet-nãʔã
child-PL
children

ta-sawis-anãʔã hiksamañ-ta-latʰa-Ø-wa.
PS1-grandchild-PL long.for-O1-S3-PRS-DECL.
I miss my grandchildren.

hãi nalik-ka-hensoʔ na-naʔ-Ø-wa.
PN3 remember-OBL-ALWAYS COP-S1-PRS-DECL.
I remember (about) them all the time.

hãi-nãʔã na-set-sa̰ takoʔtakon-latʰa-Ø-wa.
PN3-PL PS3-speak-NCL.SPEECH crooked-S3-PRS-DECL
All of them, their speech, it is crooked.

nakatosa-nãʔã ha̰i-soʔka-ta-nãʔã kanih-jeʔ-latʰa-Ø-wa.
Negarotê-PL PN3-NCL.HUM-FEM-PL many-EMP-S3-PRS-DECL
The Negarotê women are many.

Mamaindê is a language that bases "the personhood of the accusative, the dative and the oblique" on a single set of verbal affixes that also agree with the person of the object (which can be any type). With this information, it is proper to establish the basic noun-verb relations of subjects/non-subjects are marked on the verb. For singular objects/non-subjects, specific markers appear alone and do not exclusively mark the singular as they "can also be found in conjunction with a separate plural morpheme". Contrastingly, the markers for plural objects/non-subjects distinguish both number and person.

Object (Non-subject) Person markers - plural
/-leʔ/ ~ /-loʔ/	Object - 1st person plural – inclusive
/-tahlik/ ~ /-tahloʔ/	Object - 1st person plural – exclusive
/-ʔai/	Object - 2nd and 3rd person plurals
