= Kumana language =

Kumana language may refer to the following:

- Kuyubí language
- Cumanagoto language
- Chaima language
