= Nambikwara language =

Indigenous language spoken in Brazil

Nambikwara
- Southern Nambikwara, Nambiquara
- Native to: Mato Grosso, Brazil
- Ethnicity: Nambikwara
- Native speakers: 720 (2006)
- Language family: Nambikwaran: Nambikwara

Language codes
- ISO 639-3: nab
- Glottolog: sout2994
- ELP: Nambikwara

Nambikwara (also called Nambiquara and Southern Nambiquara to distinguish it from Mamaindê) is an indigenous language spoken by the Nambikwara, who reside on federal reserves covering approximately 50,000 square kilometres of land in Mato Grosso and neighbouring parts of Rondônia in Brazil. UNESCO’s Atlas of the World Languages in Danger classifies Nambikwara as vulnerable.

== History ==
According to David Price (1983), a reference to the Nambikwara people was made as early as 1671 in a report by Padre Gonçalo de Veras. However, in another account from the Povos Indígenas do Brasil, the Nambikwara people are said to have been first contacted in 1770, when the Portuguese, in search of gold, began building a road between Forte Bragança and Vila Bela. Further contact was established when in 1907, Colonel Candido Mariano da Silva Rondon began exploring the territories inhabited by the Nambikwara, and established a telegraph line between 1909 and 1915.

In the early to mid 1900s, the Nambikwara were also contacted by missionaries from the United States and from throughout Brazil. One group of missionaries, known as the New Tribes Mission, were killed by the Nambikwara in 1950 supposedly in an act of revenge. However, not all contact with missionaries resulted in death. In 1962, the “first systematic studies of the Nambikwara languages” were carried out, specifically for the Mamaindê language. Since the 1930s, Mamaindê speakers were also taught the bible as it was translated into their language by some missionaries, and some were convinced to join schools and learn Portuguese. According to David Price while there had been a long history of Christian education for the Mamaindê speakers, many of them could not actually be considered Christian believers and simply spoke of their experiences with the missionaries as “learning about white people’s way of life”.

In 1968, then president of Brazil Costa e Silva created the first reserve for the Nambikwara people with the aim of “transfer[ing] all of the Nambikwara groups to the single reserve [to] free up the rest of the region for farming initiatives”. Unfortunately, the reserve that the Nambikwara were transferred to contained inefficient soil, and the lands originally inhabited by them with the most efficient soil were all sold off to farming companies by the late 1960s. The construction of a highway between Cuiabá and Porto Velho also decreased the size of the Nambikwara territory even further. At present, many of the original 30 groups of Nambikwara people are extinct, and the remaining people reside in the nine territories of the Nambiquara territory: “Vale do Guaporé, Pirineus de Souza, Nambikwara, Lagoa dos Brincos, Taihãntesu, Pequizal, Sararé, Tirecatinga and Tubarão-Latundê”.

== Background ==
The Nambikwara language family can be divided into three major groups: Sabanê, Northern Nambikwara (Mamaindê), and Southern Nambikwara (or just Nambikwara). Sabanê is spoken by the Nambikwara inhabiting the northern part of their demarcated territory, north of the Iquê river. Sabanê speakers were most affected by epidemics brought by contact with missionaries, and many of them had died because of those epidemics. However, today many of the remaining Sabanê speakers live with Mamaindê speakers or in Vilhena city.

Northern Nambikwara is spoken by groups of Nambikwara along the Roosevelt and Tenente Marques rivers. Northern Nambikwara is further divided into seven mutually intelligible dialects spoken by the Da’wandê, Da’wendêm Âlpimentê, Yâlãkuntê (Latundê), Yalakalorê, Mamaindê, and Negarotê people. Lastly, Southern Nambikwara is spoken by the rest of the Nambikwara people, with four regional dialects spread across the Juruena valley, the region along the Galera and Guaporé rivers, and the region along the Sararé valley. Unlike Northern Nambikwara, Southern Nambikwara dialects are not mutually intelligible.

Attempts to describe Southern Nambikwara have been made since at least the early 20th century, often in the form of vocabulary lists. In his 1978 paper “The Nambiquara Linguistic Family” David Price discusses several vocabulary lists published between 1910 and 1960, including those compiled by Levi-Strauss (1948), Rondon (1948), and Roquette-Pinto (1913). Price insists that early vocabulary lists are largely inadequate, and often contain mistranslations, because many of them were compiled by individuals with no formal linguistics training. Further, Price argues that these early publications do not reflect the “phonological realit(ies)” of the Nambikwara language, because these researchers tended to assume that sounds that were contrastive in their native languages were also contrastive in Nambiquara.

Since the 1960s, more sophisticated and complete descriptions of Nambikwara have been published, including descriptions of Nambikwara phonology, morphophonemics, syntax and semantics. Price himself published a paper in 1976 called “Southern Nambiquara Phonology”, which lists the speech sounds found in Nambikwara and discusses stress and length in the language. An earlier paper by Barbara Kroeker (1972) also describes Nambikwara phonology, and devotes more attention to the phonological processes that occur in the language and the morphological restrictions on Nambiquara sound patterns. A detailed description of the Nambikwara grammar comes from Menno Kroeker's (2001) paper “A Descriptive Grammar of Nambiquara”, which was published by the Summer Institute of Linguistics. Kroeker's descriptions are based on the several hundred pages of data he gathered while living among the Nambikwara people, and focuses primarily on the language's syntax and semantics. Specifically, he describes Nambikwra parts of speech, word order, tense, aspect, mood, voice, clause structures, and noun incorporation. Kroeker (2001) also briefly outlines Nambikwara phonology, providing a list of phonemes and a discussion of syllable structure, tone, length, and stress. Ivan Lowe has also published descriptive grammars of Nambikwara through the Summer Institute of Linguistics. No pedagogical grammar of the language is currently available.

== Phonology ==
=== Vowels ===
Oral vowels
	Front	Back
Close	i	u
Mid	e	o
Open	a	ʌ

Creaky
Front	Back
ḭ	ṵ
ḛ	o̰
a̰	

Nasal
Front	Back
ĩ	ũ
ẽ	
ã	

Creaky-nasal
Front	Back
ḭ̃	ṵ̃
ḛ̃	
ã̰	

Adapted from Kroeker (2001)

=== Consonants ===
		Bilabial	Alveolar	Palatal	Velar		Glottal
		Bilabial	Alveolar	Palatal	Plain	Labialized	Glottal
Plosive/ Affricate	Plain	p	t	tʃ ⟨j⟩	k	kʷ ⟨kw⟩	ʔ ⟨x⟩
Plosive/ Affricate	Aspirated	pʰ ⟨ph⟩	tʰ ⟨th⟩		kʰ ⟨kh⟩	kʷʰ ⟨kwh⟩	
Plosive/ Affricate	Glottalized		tˀ ⟨tx⟩		kˀ ⟨kx⟩		
Fricative	Plain	ɸ ⟨f⟩	s				h
Fricative	Glottalized	ɸˀ ⟨fx⟩	sˀ ⟨sx⟩				hˀ ⟨hx⟩
Nasal	Plain	(m)	n				
Nasal	Glottalized	ˀm ⟨mx⟩	ˀn ⟨nx⟩				
Sonorant	Plain		l	j ⟨y⟩		w	
Sonorant	Glottalized		ˀl ⟨lx⟩	ˀj ⟨yx⟩		ˀw ⟨wx⟩	
Sonorant	Aspirated					ʍʰ ⟨wh⟩	

Adapted from Kroeker (2001) and Lowe (1999).

According to Kroeker (2001), /m/ only appears in loanwords or following the diphthong /au/. In addition to the segments shown above, Nambikwara also has [bm], which appears following the diphthong /ãu/, [ŋ], which appears before a velar stop and after a nasal vowel, [gŋ], which appears before a velar stop and after an oral vowel, and [r], which is an allophone of /l/ that appears following front vowels. Kroeker notes the existence of the voiced alveolar implosive /ɗ/, but argues that it is falling out of use.

=== Tones ===
Southern Nambikwara is a tonal language with three tones:

1. a falling tone marked with a superscript "1"
2. a rising tone marked "2"
3. a low tone marked "3"

Examples:

- ˈhot^{3}su^{2} 'monkey'
- ˈḛ^{3}rhʔu^{2} 'cashew'
- ˈʔwḭ̃^{1}su^{2} 'toad'

== Morphology ==
=== Verbs ===
Nambikwara has main verbs and subordinate verbs. Main verbs contain suffixes that indicate mood (indicative or imperative), person-number, and aspect. Indicative main verbs have additional suffixes which indicate tense-evidentiality.

=== Indicative main verbs ===
Indicative main verbs in Nambikwara are either declarative or dubitative. Declarative sentences are used when the speaker does not doubt the information being given, and dubitative sentences are used when there is some doubt about the information being given. Indicative verbs are inflected to represent subject person, subject number, speaker number, aspect, and tense in the following ways:

Indicative Main Verb Inflections
Subject Person	first, second, third
Subject Number	singular, dual, plural
Speaker Number	singular, plural
Aspect	perfective, imperfective
Tense	Future, present, recent past, mid past, remote past

Adapted from Lowe (1999).

As indicated in the table, there are three subject persons in Nambikwara. The first person subject and the third person subject can either be singular or non-singular (which covers both dual and plural counts), whereas the second person subject can be counted as singular, dual, or plural. Additionally, a distinction is made between the inclusive and exclusive forms of first-person non-singular subjects.

Unlike English, Nambikwara also distinguishes between three different levels of past: recent past, mid past, and remote past. Furthermore, they are also inflected to represent evidentiality: whether the statement was based on observational, inferential, quotative, and what Lowe refers to as “internal support newness”. Observational statements are based on what the speaker has seen, inferential statements are based on one might assume from observing a simultaneous action or a set of actions that may resulted from a previous one, quotative statements are based on what the speakers has heard from another person or people, and internal support statements are based on their “gut feelings”. The following table displays the suffixes used for indicative verbs:

Indicative Main Verb Suffixes
-wa^{2}	Imperfective aspect
-ra^{2}	Perfective aspect
-nu^{2}~nĩn^{2}	Inferential
-ta^{2}	Observed circumstances
-na^{2}	Observed action
-ta^{1}	Quotative
-hẽ^{3}	Mid past tense external
-nha^{2}	Present tense internal
-hẽ^{2}	Recent past tense internal
-hẽ^{1}	Mid past tense internal
-na^{3}	Action currently observed by both speaker and hearer

Adapted from Lowe (1999).

In the following example sentences (1) and (2) from Lowe (1999), one can see how the use of a specific suffix helps the hearer distinguish whether the statement being given is observational or quotative:

wa3kon2 -na2 -ra2
work -OBSERVED.ACTION -PERFV
'He worked.' (I observed, recently)

wa3kon3 -ta1 -hẽ1 -ra2
work -QUOTATIVE -MID.PAST.INTERNAL -PERFV
'He worked.' (I was told, in the past)

=== Imperative main verbs ===
Imperative main verbs in Nambikwara contain suffixes to reflect speaker number (singular, plural), subject person-number (singular, dual, plural), and aspect (perfective, imperfective). Imperative verbs are further divided into three positive verb forms and one negative verb form. The positive verb forms are used to describe “an action to be done in the immediate future, […] and an action to be done in the more distant future”.

=== Pronouns ===
Nambikwara has seven different kinds of pronouns: personal, possessive, indefinite, demonstrative, reflexive, reciprocal, and interrogative.

Pronouns
			Suffixes			Free
			Subject	Object	Copula	Free
1st person	singular		-a^{1}	-sa^{3}~-sa^{2}	-sa^{1}	dai^{2}na^{2}
1st person	non-singular	inclusive	-kḭ^{3}	-nĩn^{3}		dai^{2}wã^{1}kḭ^{3}na^{1}ai^{2}na^{2}
1st person	non-singular	exclusive	-sĩ^{1}na^{1}	-sa^{2}sĩn^{1}		da^{2}nũn^{2}ka^{3}tai^{2}na^{2}
2nd person	singular		-in^{1}	-ʔna^{2}	-sin^{1}	wʔãi^{2}na^{2}
2nd person	dual		-ya^{3}hin^{1}-	-ʔna^{2}li^{3}		wʔã^{2}nũn^{3}ka^{2}tai^{2}na^{2}
2nd person	plural		-ya^{3}lhin^{1}-	-ʔna^{2}li^{3}		wʔã^{2}nũn^{3}ka^{2}tai^{2}na^{2}
3rd person	singular	masculine	∅	∅	-la^{1}	jah^{1}lai^{2}na^{2}
3rd person	singular	feminine	∅	∅	-la^{1}	ta^{1}ʔka^{3}ʔlai^{2}na^{2}
3rd person	non-singular		-ain^{1}	-ain^{1}		tũn^{1}ka^{3}tai^{2}na^{2}

The table above shows the personal pronouns in Nambikwara as described by Lowe. The category of personal pronouns is divided into suffix and free pronouns; suffix pronouns are further divided into subject pronouns, object pronouns, and copula pronouns. Personal pronouns mark for person and number. Additionally, third person singular pronouns mark for gender (feminine or masculine), and 1st person non-singular distinguishes between inclusive and exclusive (Ibid). 2nd person pronouns distinguish between singular, dual and plural, while first and third person only mark singular or non-singular number.

Possessive pronouns in Nambikwara mark person but not number or gender. They attach to the noun that they possess as prefixes.

Possessive pronouns
1 person	txa^{2}-
2 person	wxa^{2}-
3 person	a^{2}-
1+2 person	twa^{2}wã^{1}-

Indefinite pronouns
ĩ^{2}li^{3}te^{2}a^{2}	'anyone'
ã^{1}thũn^{3}te^{2}a^{2}	'someone'

Demonstrative pronoun	-ai^{2}li^{2}
Reflexive pronoun	-nha^{1}
Reciprocal pronoun	-nyhuhl

sxi2h -ai2li2
house -DEM
"that house"

Hxi2yo3 -li2 -nh -a1 -h3 -la2.
Finger -cut -REFL -1SG -T/E.IO.PAST -PFV
"I cut my finger."

Finally, interrogative pronouns are free and appear at the beginning of an interrogative sentence.

Interrogative pronouns
Who (human)	ĩh^{1}te^{2}a^{2}
What (non-human)	yã^{1}te^{2}a^{2}
Where	ĩh^{1}nũ^{1}la^{3}ta̰^{3}
When	ĩh^{1}nxe^{3}hĩ^{1}na^{2}
How	ĩh^{1}nxet^{3}sxã^{3}
Why	ĩh^{1}nxe^{3}ha^{2}kxai^{3}
What purpose	ĩh^{1}nxe^{3}kxa^{2}yã̰n^{3}ti^{3}ta̰^{3}

=== Nouns ===
Noun roots in Nambikwara typically end in a vowel or the consonant n, t, or h. Classifiers indicating things such as the shape of the referent are suffixed to the root. Some examples include the property of being stick-like (kat^{3}) or powder-like (nũn^{3}). Definiteness (indefinite, definite, or conditional) and causality are also reflected by the use of suffixes. Definite nouns also use additional suffixes to indicate “demonstrativeness, spatio-temporality, evidentiality, and causality”. Sources of evidentiality inflected in definite nouns include observational, inferential, and quotative. However, Lowe (1999) states that there are few corpus examples of the simultaneous use of time and evidentiality suffixes in definite nouns. In the following sentence examples from Lowe (1999), one can see how suffixes are used to distinguish between a bone-like manioc root that was seen recently, and one that was seen in the past:

wa3lin3 -su3 -n3ti2
manioc -CL:BONE.LIKE -OBSERVATIONAL.RECENT.PAST.GIVEN
‘The manioc root that both you and I saw recently.’

wa3lin3 -su3 -ait3ta3li2
manioc -CL:BONE.LIKE -OBSERVATIONAL.MID.PAST.GIVEN
‘The manioc root that both you and I saw some time past.’

== Syntax ==
=== Subject and object marking ===
Nambikwara does not distinguish between subject and object forms in noun stems in both transitive and intransitive sentences and uses an active-stative system for case marking. However, when it is necessary to mention the subject of a sentence, personal pronoun free forms can be used. This only occurs when “a new participant is introduced, or when there would be too much confusion if [it] were omitted”. Nambikwara also makes use of different subject and object suffixes that must “refer anaphorically to the real person/object that is either alluded to or given overtly in the subject/object of the clause” and are divided into first, second, and third person. Additionally, some suffixes will be further divided into dual and combined forms or plural and combined forms, but only one of those forms can be affixed to a verb. According to Kroeker (2001), the dual form is used following singular forms, and the plural form is also used following singular forms. The following tables (adapted from Kroeker 2001) lists the personal pronoun free forms and bound object and subject suffixes that can be used in Nambikwara.

Free form personal pronouns
1st person		txai^{2}li^{2}	'I'
2nd person		wxãi^{2}na^{2}	'you'
3rd person	gender neutral	te^{2}na^{2}	'he'/'she'
3rd person	masc	jah^{1}la^{2}	'he'
3rd person	fem	ta^{1}ka^{3}lxa^{2}	'she'
Pluralize free forms		-nãu^{3}xa^{2}	'group'

Object Marking Suffixes
Me	-sa^{3}
You (singular)	-nxa^{2}
Third person singular	Ø
Us Dual	-yah^{3}
Us Combined	syah^{3}
You (two or more) Dual	-ti^{3}
You (two or more) Combined
Them	-yah^{3}
Us (exclusive) Plural	-sĩn^{1}
Us (exclusive) Combined	-sa2sĩn1
Us (inclusive) Plural	-ne^{3}
Us (inclusive)Combined
Us (me + them) Plural	-ya^{3}sain^{1}
Us (me + them) Combined	-Øya^{3}sain^{1}
Us (us + them) Plural	-ya^{3}sain^{1}sĩn^{1}
Us (us + them) Combined	-Øya^{3}sain^{1}sĩn^{1}
You (plural) Plural	-ti^{3}
You (plural) Combined	-nx^{2}ti^{3}
Them Plural	-ain^{1}
Them Combined	-Øain^{1}

Subject Marking Suffixes
I	-a^{1}
You	-in^{1}
Third person singular	Ø
We Dual	-yah^{3}
We Combined	-ya^{3}ha^{1}
You singular dual form	-yah^{3}
You singular combined	-ya^{3}hin^{1}
They dual	-yah^{3}
They combined	-yah^{3} (Ø)
We (exclusive) plural	-sĩn^{1}
We (exclusive) combined	-sĩ^{1}na^{1}
We (inclusive) Plural	-ki^{3}
We (inclusive) Combined	-ki^{3}
We (me + they) Plural	-ya^{3}sain^{1}
We (me + they) Combined	-ya^{3}sain^{1}Ø
We (us + they) Plural	-ya^{3}sain^{1}sĩn^{1}
We (us + they) Combined	-ya^{3}sain^{1}sĩn^{1}Ø
You (plural) plural	-lxi^{3}
You (plural) Combined	-yah^{3}lxin^{1}
They Plural	-ain^{1}
They Combined	-ain^{1}Ø

The following sentences show the different uses of the multiple forms of “you” and “us” in the object position:

Ũ3hũ1 -nxa2 -Ø -tu1 -wa2.
give -O.2SG -3SG -F -IPFV
"He will give to you."

Ũ3hũ1 -nx2 -ti3 -Ø -tu1 -wa2.
give -O.2SG -2PL -3SG -F -IPFV
"He will give it to you (two or more)."

One important thing to note on subject suffix marking is that the suffix -sĩn^{1} must always be used “when someone is spokesperson for a group in conveying information”. This is because although they are speaking on their own, they are acting on behalf of the interests of a larger group.

== Semantics ==
=== Tense and evidentiality ===
In Nambikwara, verbs are divided into two major types:

1. indicative
2. imperative

Indicative verbs are obligatorily marked for tense. Nambikwara distinguishes between five tenses:

1. remote past: any event that occurred before the speaker's lifetime
2. mid past: an event that happened after the speaker was born but before the day of the utterance
3. recent past: an event that occurred on the same day as the utterance
4. present: an event that is currently happening
5. future: any event that has not yet begun happening

Tense is indicated by a suffix attaching to the verb, with the exception of the present tense, which is unmarked.

Verbs inflected for any tense other than the future must also be marked for evidentiality. There are two types of evidentiality suffixes:

1. verification markers
2. orientation markers

Both types are realized differently depending on the tense with which they are used, and neither of them occur with the future tense. There are two types of verification suffixes:

1. individual, which indicates that only the speaker witnessed or heard about the event
2. collective, which indicates that both the speaker and the addressee(s) saw or heard about the event

Orientation suffixes indicate the source of the information, and are divided into four types:

1. Observation suffixes indicate that the speaker witnessed the event that they are describing occur.
2. Deductive or inferential suffixes suggest that the speaker did not witness the event, but inferred that it happened based on evidence that they did observe.
3. Customary suffixes indicate that the speaker believes the event happened because things always happen that way.
4. Narration or quotative suffixes indicate that the speaker obtained this information from someone else, and is now quoting or paraphrasing.

As Lowe (1999) notes, sometimes speakers employ the present tense and the verification suffix that indicates that both the speaker and addressee witnessed the event when describing past events that neither party witnessed. This is a story telling device, used to make the event that the speaker is describing sound more interesting and believable.

Neither Kroeker (2001) nor Lowe (1999) provide a complete list of the tense and evidentiality markers of Nambikwara. According to both, the future tense marker is -tu^{1}, though Kroeker (2001) asserts that when the verb is negated, the future marker becomes -lho^{3}. Lowe (1999) also gives the following chart, which shows some verbal evidentiality and tense suffixes for verbs that convey new information.

Inferential	-nũ^{2}-nĩn^{2}
Observed circumstances	-ta^{2}
Observed action	-na^{2}
Quotative	-ta^{1}
Mid past external	-he^{3}
Mid past internal	-hẽ^{1}
Recent past internal	-hẽ^{2}
Present tense internal	-nha^{2}
Action currently being observed by speaker and addressee	-na^{3}

Nambikwara has two aspects: the perfective, -la^{2}, and the imperfective, -wa^{2}. Which aspect suffix attaches to the verb depends on the tense of the verb. The perfective suffix attaches to verbs whose tense is one of three past tenses, the negative future tense, and if the verb is a stative in any form other than the first person present. The imperfective suffix attaches to verbs that are marked with the present tense, positive future tense, or that are statives in the first person and present tense.

When a sentence in Nambikwara contains a subordinate clause, the verb of the subordinate clause is not marked for tense or evidentiality. If the tense and evidentiality of the subordinate verb is the same as it is for the main verb, these markers simply attach to the main verb and are left out of the subordinate clause. When the subordinate verb does not take tense or evidentiality markers unless this is required to avoid ambiguity.

Auxiliary verbs in Nambikwara appear following the main verb. When a construction contains an auxiliary verb, the tense and evidentiality suffixes will attach to the auxiliary verb instead of to the main verb. In cases where the person or tense changes from the main verb to the auxiliary verb, the construction must be rephrased.

In interrogative and imperative sentences, the tense markers are replaced by question markers and a different complex of suffixes, respectively. Nambikwara has four types of imperative verbs: three positive imperatives, and one negative. The three positive imperatives distinguish between two types of future; one type of positive imperative indicates that the action is to be performed in the immediate future, while the other two suggest that the event must be performed in the more distant future.

In Nambikwara, verb phrases are conjoined by replacing the tense and evidentiality suffixes on the verbs with a coordination suffix (namely, -i^{2}), and moving the suffix string indicating tense and evidentiality to the end of the coordination, so that it applies to both conjuncts. Lowe (1999) provides this example:

wã2la2 wa2hi3l -i2 wã2ho3ʔ -i2 -na1 -tũ1 -ʔã1 na1 -hẽ2 -ra2
clothes wash -COORDINATE bathe -COORDINATE -1SG -FUT -IMPERFV.THOUGHT 1SG -REC.INTERNAL -PERFV
“I intend to wash my clothes and take a bath”.

Tense in Nambikwara impacts parts of speech aside from verbs. Adverbs with a temporal stem, for instance must be marked with a temporal suffix that matches the tense of the corresponding verb.

== Vocabulary ==
English	Nambikwara
Blood	Tihayauswu
Bone	Susu
Breast	Nunki
Death	Yalu
Dog	Wayali
Ear	Nenen
Eye	Yena
Fire	Han'ieairawa
Full	Nek'ih
Hand	Hiki
Hear	Insanewih
Horn	Ne'tau
I	T'aili
Knee	Sukw'alaulen
Leaf	Waihnanaitanta
Louse	Kanihne
Name	I'nli
New	Wununtsunala
Night	Kan'ahti
Nose	Wanen
One	Kanaki
See	Inn
Skin	Wannlu
Star	Hikata
Sun	Uxenaki
Tongue	Yo'helu
Tooth	Wi
Tree	Hisakat
Two	Hali
Water	Innyaus'nu
Who	Nannuwa
You	Wannina

== Bibliography ==
- Lowe, Ivan (1999). "Nambiquara". In Dixon, R.M.W.; Aikhenvald, Alexandra Y. (eds.). The Amazonian Languages (PDF).
- Kroeker, Menno (2001). "A descriptive grammar of Nambiquara". International Journal of American Linguistics. 67 (1): 1–87. doi:10.1086/466446. JSTOR 1265810. S2CID 145291917.
