= Francisco de Tauste =

Venezuelan linguist

- Born: March 28, 1628; Tauste, Spain
- Died: November 11, 1685 (aged 57)
- Occupations: Missionary and linguist

Francisco de Tauste (March 28, 1626 Tauste, Spain - April 11, 1685) was a Spanish missionary and linguist of the 17th century who is known for his publications about Cariban languages of the Caribbean.

Born Miguel Torralba de Rada in Tauste, he took the name Francisco upon entering the convent of the Capuchins of Tarazona at the age of 19. After staying at the order's convent in Calatayud, he was ordained as a priest in 1652. Little is known about his training in those convents, but his biographers presume that he wouuld have had a traditional training in topics such as Latin, philosophy, and theology.

Then then set out for America, where the Capuchin friar Lorenzo de Magallón had gotten permission from the Council of the Indies to establish Christian missions. He landed in Cumaná in the Province of New Andalusia in 1658.

Governor Pedro de Brizuela had assigned regions of his domains among Capuchin according to their geographic origins. Tauste, together with Lorenzo de Magallón, José de Carabantes and other Aragoneses, was assigned to missionary work on the left bank of the Orinoco river.

That same year he lived through an epidemic that broke out in Caracas and surrounding settlements.

The Aragonese Capuchins founded their first mission in Guácharo in 1659. Missions in the area were in conflict with each other, and Tauste had to return to Spain in 1661 in order to make a formal report to the crown in order to return to America. In the following years, the Capuchins would go on to found four more missions.

Tauste's linguistic gifts were soon noticed by his companions when he learned the language of the Chaima people. Not only did he learn their language, he recorded rules of their grammar in writing. when he was obliged to return to Spain to report on the state of the state of the missions, he was given approval to publish his linguistic work.

Today, Tauste's work is a key reference on the Chaima language, which is no longer spoken. Notably, he focused exclusively on a single dialect of the broader Itoto Majun language, which the clergy considered critical for their missionary work.

Tauste was elected prefect of the missions of Cumaná in 1683, shortly before he died of poisoning in 1685.
