= Chaima language =

Extinct Cariban language of Venezuela

Chaima
- Native to: Venezuela
- Region: Monagas
- Extinct: (date missing)
- Language family: Cariban: Venezuelan; Mapoyo–Tamanaku; Chaima–Cumana; Chaima

Language codes
- ISO 639-3: ciy
- Glottolog: chai1253
- ELP: Chaima
- Linguasphere: 83-OBB-bb

Chaima is an extinct Cariban language of Venezuela.

== Documentation ==
The earliest documentation of Chaima was recorded by the Capuchin friar Francisco de Tauste.

In the 18th century the well-known explorer and scientist Alexander von Humboldt recorded information about Chayma in his work Voyage aux régions équinoxiales du Nouveau Continent, and its English translation.

Humboldt's wordlist is below:

Chayma	English
U-re	I, myself.
Eure	you.
Teure	he, him.
Teurecon	themselves.
Uchere	me also.
Euya	to you.
Toya	perhaps, teuya, to him.
Taquer	with him.
Uca or uguarey	like me.
Ucarepra	not like me.
Muene, muenere	that.
Temerene	all that.
Tibinpupra	one only.
Achacono	both.
Achoroaono	all three.
Ucheepchic, ucheucurca	myself, in insisting, myself without doubt.
Taquer	with him.
Upuyao or upunyao	for me.
Guaz	I am, (az, to be; g-u me, thus, me to be).
Pra	no, not.
Zis	sun,
Nuna	moon.
Septuca	Venus.
Vilaborei	the Pleiades.
Apotos	fire.
Tuna	water.
Conopo	rain, shower.
Pesissi	wind.
Mico	child.
Ures	girl.
Urajot	boy.
Iguanetpur or ipuetepuin	widower.
Ipuetepur	widow.
Tuguerizquen	the bridegroom.
Tuanequen	the bride.
Ye	tree or wood.
Caney	a shed.
Chinchorro	hammock.
Uguemur	fever.
Notomocan	that is done.
Panaz or paremana	that is enough.
Ucaymuer, uguozpar, or uguozuar	my game, what I have killed.
Eniri, eneritpur, or enerizpo	your work.
Piache	magician, physician.
Ivorokiamo	devil, evil spirit.
Chavi	tiger, jaguar.
Chavinaci	descending from a tiger, a figurative expression meaning a cruel man.
Totelelo	cock.
Focora	hen.
Cuivivi	duck.
Tucuchi	humming-bird.
Sicotu	chigoe, pulex penetrans.
Bututo	pronouncing the b nearly as an f, flute.
Camo	to sing.
Tandema	to morrow.
Chuque	take, imperative.
Pisca	carry, imperative.
Tropse	he bursts.
Kesoptreipnei	he is ill.
Ispinkepolepi	it is hot.
Tenetkinpoli	it is cold.
Nesselcane	it thunders.
Tinpole poc maney	it rains already.
Mico nis-inimipani	a child is born.
Tuquerizque camanay, or tuputcamanay?	are you married? (masc.)
Tuaneccamanay	are you married? (fem.)
Tuguerizqueguaz	I am married. (masc.)
Tuaniqueguaz	I am married (fem,)
Iguanepuin uze, or iguanepra	I am a widow.
Iguirichipraguaz, or ipuitepra	I am a widower.
Iguanetac	marry, speaking to a woman.
Ipuetetac	marry, speaking to a man.
Epuitpe nechia meche	let this person be your wife.
Tupaguenapiaz	I have eaten enough.
Epuequere	for you.
Cupuncomiao, or cupuecon, or cupuerecon	for us.
Ipuec ipagua	he is with him.
Onquepan, or aponomac	give me more.
Guarepanca	I will carry more.
Epuec charpe guaz	I am merry with you.
Apazcatepayene	he likes to kill.
Notomocan	that is done.
Guanatpuec	he cultivates his garden.
Quenapuinuze	I have not seen him.
Ayaz yecran	the maize is getting wet.
Tecreguez	it is slippery.
Imoron, or imoromnique	poisoner.
Turopiurpuec	he is dying.
Yarazinyao or tarazincomiao	he will be afraid.
Nunenao	by moon-light.
Eyepatechin	they must learn
Etatechin	they must hear.
Enertechin	they must do.
Uyare onquepe	give me also.
Amachenepque	go and bring me.
Amna zesin, or enzez	let us go.
Etigua?	what is that?
Mananequian	he is called.
Ipunet	he chooses it.
Anec narepo	who has seen him?
Guayque cumuepo, or cumuepuec	they are going to kill game.
Zazamar	road.
Conopyaune, or conopyayere	in the time of the shower.
Quenpotupra quoguaz	I do not know him.
Quenepra quoguaz	I have not seen him.
Terepuirpucc	why is he frightened?
Turayerpuec	because of the disease.
Chetayma	within.
Cumuernian	he wanted to beat him.
Upatay guane mana	there is honey in my hut.
Tumanemia	always dancing.
Utechirin	I will go also.
Mazpantonoma apotoaca itumuecon	the wicked only will go into the fire.
Patre Cumanantacanan	is the father at Cumana?
Cumanantacamana	yes, he is at Cumana.
Montaonocon, or taronocon	those of this place.
Miyonocon	those of that place below.
Yequiz puec capuemiaz	I tied him to the tree.
