= Nambikwaran languages =

Language family of Brazil

Nambikwaran
- Geographic distribution: Mato Grosso, Rondônia and Pará, in Brazil
- Linguistic classification: One of the world's primary language families
- Subdivisions: Mamaindê; Nambikwara; Sabanê; Lakondê; Latundê; Tawandê

Language codes
- Glottolog: namb1299
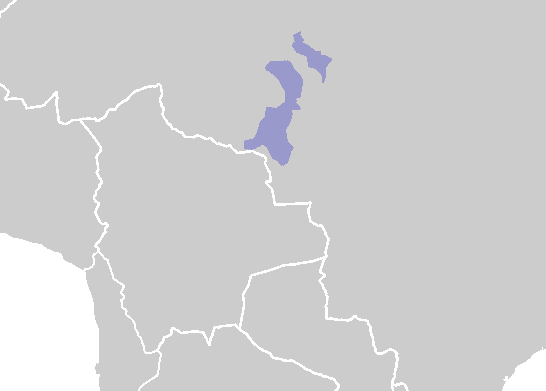

The Nambikwaran languages are a language family of half a dozen languages, all spoken in the state of Mato Grosso in Brazil. They have traditionally been considered dialects of a single language, but at least three of them are mutually unintelligible.

The total number of speakers is estimated to be about 1,000, with Nambikwara proper being 80% of that number. Most Nambikwara are monolingual but some young men speak Portuguese. Especially the men of the Sabanê group are trilingual, speaking both Portuguese and Mamainde.

- Mamaindê (250-340)
- Lakondê (1)
- Latundê (19)
- Tawandê (1)
- Nambikwara (720)
- Sabanê (3)

The varieties of Mamaindê are often seen as dialects of a single language but are treated as separate Northern Nambikwaran languages by Ethnologue. Sabanê is a single speech community and thus has no dialects, while the Nambikwara language has been described as having eleven.

== Genetic relations ==
Price (1978) proposes a relationship with Kanoê (Kapixaná), but this connection is not widely accepted.

== Language contact ==
Jolkesky (2016) notes that there are lexical similarities with the Aikanã, Irantxe, Itonama, Kanoe, Kwaza, Peba-Yagua, Arawak, Bororo, and Karib language families due to contact.

== Varieties ==
=== Jolkesky (2016) ===
Internal classification by Jolkesky (2016):

(† = extinct)

- Nambikwaran
  - Sabane
  - Nambikwara, Northern
    - Guaporé: Mamainde; Negarote; Tawende
    - Roosevelt: Lakonde; Latunde; Tawande
  - Nambikwara, Southern
    - Alantesu: Alantesu; Hahãintesu; Waikisu; Wasusu
    - Halotesu: Halotesu; Kithãulhu; Wakalitesu; Sawentesu
    - Manduka: Hukuntesu; Niyahlosu; Siwaisu
    - Sarare

== Proto-language ==
Proto-Nambikwaran
- Proto-Nambiquara
- Reconstruction of: Nambikwaran languages

Proto-Nambiquara reconstructions by Price (1978):

Proto-Nambiquara reconstructions by Price (1978)

gloss	Proto-Nambikwaran
‘maize, corn’	*ka³yat³
‘tapir’	*hv³¹ũː¹m
‘moon’	*h'e³¹v³
‘water (n)’	*na1pə̃³¹
‘now’	*hi¹n
‘water’	*yaut³
‘to tie’	*t'ait¹
‘to walk’	*h'ai²
‘that’	*tei²l
‘here’	*tiː¹
‘bow’	*pok'³
‘wing’	*n'əi³C
‘to hit’	*su³l
‘to drink’	*naː²
‘animal’	*ha³no³la³
‘mouth’	*youː²
‘good’	*məu³li⁴
‘white’	*pãn³
‘to play’	*ləuː²n
‘head’	*naik³
‘hair’	*ĩć³
‘dog’	*waiː³yvl³
‘to fall’	*hi²
‘road’	*ha³tẽp³
‘savannah’	*mãl³
‘to sing’	*pain³
‘grass’	*sit³
‘meat’	*sĩn³
‘house’	*s'ip³
‘bark, shell’	*kv³ləu³
‘to dig’	*'uh³
‘sky’	*h'əu³p(an⁴)
‘to smell’	*nh'õn³
‘horn’	*na³
‘rain’	*ha³mə̃i³
‘ashes’	*Cv³nõn³
‘snake’	*t'ep³
‘to scratch’	*kɨn²
‘to eat’	*yain³
‘long’	*ləː²
‘heart’	*yv³lã¹k
‘string’	*ẽp³
‘string’	*nu²
‘to run’	*hip³
‘to chop’	*tau³
‘child’	*mə̃ić³
‘to give’	*õː¹
‘to lie (down)’	*ć'aː¹
‘tooth’	*wiː³
‘day’	*lãn²ti³
‘two’	*p'aː¹l(in¹)
‘to sleep’	*ha³mũ³n'i²
‘he’	*pai³
‘his’	*na²
‘to rub’	*lɨ¹nɨ³
‘to listen’	*ain³
‘I’	*t'ai²l
‘my’	*t'a²
‘knife’	*yu³l
‘to speak’	*sɨ¹
‘beans’	*ka³mat³
‘liver’	*p'i⁴l
‘arrow’	*hauːt'¹
‘flower’	*yãuć³
‘fire’	*yat²
‘leaf’	*ha⁴ćeih³
‘leaf’	*n'ãn'⁴
‘cold’	*liː²
‘fog’	*wi³Ca²
‘tobacco’	*h'əić³
‘fat’	*pa³nẽit¹
‘man’	*en³t'
‘to swell’	*wa⁴kaː³n
‘knee’	*kat'³
‘to throw’	*ta⁴naː¹m
‘there’	*ti⁴paː³t
‘firewood’	*(ha³)ne¹
‘to clean’	*pəuː¹t
‘to clean’	*han³
‘tongue’	*pəi³l
‘smooth’	*wa³suː³
‘worm’	*yõ³yõ³C
‘far’	*uː²l
‘monkey’	*huć³
‘mother’	*na²C
‘hand’	*pik'²
‘left hand’	*wãt³
‘husband’	*wei³ćãi¹
‘to kill’	*hãːn³
‘forest’	*ća³w'əin³
‘to bite’	*ĩː³m
‘woman’	*(ha³)t'eh³
‘to swim’	*həup²
‘nose’	*a⁴miː³ć
‘night’	*ka³na³C
‘to see’	*ẽː²p
‘eye’	*ei³ka³
‘jaguar’	*ya³na¹l
‘where’	*pai¹
‘ear’	*n'a⁴
‘bone’	*soh³
‘egg’	*nau³
‘father’	*wãi¹
‘father’	*mĩː³n
‘bird’	*ai³k'
‘tree, stick’	*ha³piː³ć
‘foot’	*yu³k'
‘stone’	*t'a³pa³l
‘to hold’	*hi³
‘breast’	*nũn⁴k
‘fish’	*h'ain³
‘feather’	*w'əit¹
‘little’	*ći³qi⁴hn
‘leg’	*nəi²k
‘heavy’	*sa³t'ei¹
‘louse’	*ka³nãip¹ni³
‘black’	*(ta³)ton³
‘pull’	*sĩn³ćouː¹
‘when’	*na³
‘what’	*Ca¹tei²
‘to burn’	*thəp⁴
‘hot’	*mãn²
‘round’	*ma³tũ³ma³tũn³
‘straight’	*wain³
‘to laugh’	*kãm³li¹
‘spit’	*ka²sip¹
‘dry season’	*ka³məi³kəu³n
‘dry’	*lon¹
‘seed’	*kɨ⁴
‘to sit’	*yauː²
‘dirty’	*n'aː¹ć'iː³
‘fear’	*sup³l
‘earth’	*k'ĩp³
‘earth’	*nu³
‘crooked’	*ta³ko³ta³kon³
‘guts’	*ka³nai¹
‘one’	*ka³naː³ka⁴(nat³)
‘fingernail, claw’	*kai³l
‘achiote’	*top³
‘old’	*tĩn³
‘wind’	*'it³
‘green’	*sa³t'əiː³sa³i'əin³
‘red’	*həi³n
‘to come’	*mãː²
‘to live’	*ka³t'en³
‘to fly’	*h'in³
‘you’	*w'ai²n
‘your’	*mã⁴
‘to return’	*wam²l
‘to vomit’	*lop³

== Bibliography ==
- Costa, Januacele Francisca da; W. Leo M. Wetzels. 2008. Proto-Nambikwara Sound Structure. Amsterdam: Vrije Universiteit Amsterdam.
- Araujo, G. A. (2004). A Grammar of Sabanê: A Nambikwaran Language. Vrije Universiteit Amsterdam. 94. Utrecht: LOT.
- Gomes, M. A. C. F. (1991). Dicionário Mamaindé-Português/Português-Mamaindé. Cuiabá: SIL.
- Eberhard, David M. (2009). Mamaindê Grammar: a Northern Nambikwara language and its cultural context. LOT publications. ISBN 978-94-6093-012-6.
- Kroeker, M. H. (1996). Dicionário escolar bilingüe Nambikuara-Português, Português-Nambikuara. Porto Velho: SIL.
- Price, D. P. (1978). The Nambiquara Linguistic Family. Anthropological Linguistics 20:14-37.
