= Latundê =

Total population
- 20 (2007)

Regions with significant populations
- Brazil (Rondônia)

Languages
- Latundê, Portuguese

Religion
- Christianity, traditional tribal religion

The Latundê, also known as the Leitodu, are an Indigenous peoples of Brazil. They live in the Aikaná-Latundê Indigenous Reserve in the southern Rondônia in the southwestern Amazon. They share the Indigenous territory with the Kwaza and Aikanã people. Together the three tribes founded the Massaká Association of the Aikanã, Latundê and Kuazá Indigenous Peoples in 1996 to protect their rights.

== Name ==
They are also known as the Lacondê, Leitodu, or Yalapmunxte people.

== Language ==
The Latundê language is classified as a northern Nambikwara language.

== History ==
A Latundê village was discovered by outsiders in the Tubarão-Latundê Reserve in 1977; however, the villagers caught measles in 1980, and the majority of them died. The surviving Latundê on that reserve live in the Barroso Village. Because of their small numbers, they have intermarried with Kwazá and Aikanã people.

== See also ==
- Nambikwara people
