= Tawandê language =

Moribund Nambikwaran language of Brazil

Tawandê
- Native to: Brazil
- Ethnicity: Tawandê
- Native speakers: 1 (2012)
- Language family: Nambikwaran: Northern; Roosevelt; Tawandê

Language codes
- ISO 639-3: xtw
- Glottolog: tawa1278

Tawandê is a moribund Nambikwaran language of Brazil.

== Classification ==
Tawandê is closely related to the Latundê and Lakondê languages.

== Phonology ==
=== Vowels ===
Tawandê has 17 vowel phonemes.

Vowels
	Front				Central				Back			
	plain	creaky	nasal	creaky-nasal	plain	creaky	nasal	creaky-nasal	plain	creaky	nasal	creaky-nasal
Close	i	ḭ	ĩ	ḭ̃					u	ṵ	ũ	ṵ̃
Mid	e	ḛ	ẽ	ḛ̃					o	o̰		
Open					a	a̰	ã	ã̰				

=== Consonants ===
19 consonants, including two glides, are found in Tawandê.

	Bilabial	Alveolar	Palatal	Velar	Glottal
Occlusive	p	t		k	ʔ
Nasal	m	n			
Fricative		s			h
Lateral		l			
Glide	w		j		
