= Lakondê language =

Nearly extinct Nambikwaran language

Lakondê
- Native to: Brazil
- Ethnicity: Lakondê
- Native speakers: 1 (2012)
- Language family: Nambikwaran: Northern; Roosevelt; Lakondê

Language codes
- ISO 639-3: lkd
- Glottolog: lako1248

Lakondê is a nearly extinct Nambikwaran language of Brazil, spoken by only one person. The language is typologically polysynthetic.

== Speakers ==
Teresa Lakondê is the last speaker of the language. She also learnt Sabanê when she was young and frequently speaks Sabanê to other speakers.
