= Sabanê language =

Endangered Nambikwara language of Brazil

Sabanê
- Native to: Brazil
- Region: Rondônia
- Ethnicity: 40 Sabanê (2007)
- Native speakers: L1: 3 L2: 2 (2004)
- Language family: Nambikwaran: Sabanê

Language codes
- ISO 639-3: sae
- Glottolog: saba1268
- ELP: Sabané

The Sabanê language is one of the three major groups of languages spoken in the Nambikwara family. The groups of people who speak this language were located in the extreme north of the Nambikwara territory in the Rondônia and Mato Grosso states of western Brazil, between the Tenente Marques River and Juruena River. Today, most members of the group are found in the Pyreneus de Souza Indigenous Territory in the state of Rondonia.

As of 2004, there are three native and two non-native speakers of the Sabanê language, with all the speakers being more than 50 years old. With no apparent transmission level, this language is considered as highly endangered when compared to the other two Nambikwara languages which have higher levels of transmission and preservation.

== History ==
Amongst the languages in the Nambikwara family, the Sabanê people have the smallest population size. During World War II, many Nambikwara territories suffered from invasions brought about by the search for rubber to supply the war. The installation of tappers resulted in the Nambikwara people being forced into hard labour. Many of the Sabanê people were amongst those forced to provide food crops for the tappers. Due to harsh working conditions, many of the Sabanê people tried to flee to the forest, however this action was met with violent retaliation from the tappers who would return them to the village and murder multiple leaders. In addition, Sabanê people suffered from epidemics brought on by contact with the invaders of their land. This led to an immense loss of lives bringing the Sabanê people close to extinction. Around 1930, the arrival of the Jesuit Missionaries in the Cerrado region brought formal education to the Nambikwara region. By the beginning of 1940, there was the first school called "Irmãzinhas da Imaculada Conceição", where small groups of children learned to read and write. Consequently, with arrival of rubber tappers many roads began to open near the Nambikwara villages, which allowed for the formalization of indigenous education.

== Classification ==
The Nambikwara linguistic family has no known relationships with any other South American linguistic families. The word Nambikwara, Tupi in origin and meaning pierced ear, was designated to the people occupying the northwest Mato Grosso and the border areas of Rondônia. Along with Sabanê, it includes the Southern and Northern Nambikwara languages. These three branches of Nambikwara further include more than fifteen languages and dialects. Unlike Sabanê, Northern and Southern Nambikwara languages are well preserved with the Southern Nambikwara language having the highest level of transmission, with all its people being speakers of the language.

== Documentation ==
The first mention of the Sabanê people being described using this very distinction occurred in 1914, in an account from Cândido Rondon, a Brazilian explorer of Indigenous and Portuguese descent, while building a telegraph line through Nambikwaran land. Linguistic documentation did not occur until Claude Lévi-Strauss, a philosopher on a French cultural expedition did so in 1948. While there was documentation of the language concerning classification done in 1919 by Edgar Roquette-Pinto, and again in 1948 by Rondon and Faria, these two reports did not include any linguistic details. Levi-Strauss however created a word list, comprising fifty-six words, and began to describe the morphology and phonology of Sabanê in some detail. Levi-Strauss concluded that it was not possible to determine at that point whether Sabanê belonged to the Nambikwara family given significant morphological and phonological differences with the other Nambikwara languages. In the following years, Sabanê appeared in some comparative analyses and more developed documentation of the linguistics of Sabanê emerged from this. The most notable of these comparative studies comes from David Price, from the University of Brasília in 1978, who described the phonology of Nambikwara languages in comparison to one another.

=== Pedagogical grammar ===
A comprehensive linguistic description focusing exclusively on Sabanê did not emerge until Gabriel Antunes de Araujo's A Grammar of Sabanê, in 2004. Antunes de Araujo is a linguist and professor at the University of São Paulo. This book includes an extensive description of the phonology, morphology, syntax, adverbs, and interrogative words of the Sabanê language, along with some general historical and cultural information on the Sabanê people. Antunes de Araujo's work remains the most comprehensive and complete documentation of the Sabanê language, and was sponsored by CAPES (Coordenação de Aperfeiçoamento de Pessoal de Nível Superior), a body of the Brazilian government, as well as WOTRO, a Dutch organization. Another notable documentation of the Sabanê language, Levi-Straus' work, was supported by the French government.

=== Ethnography ===
There have also been some (however very few) ethnographies on the Sabanê people- one of the most prominent being by Edwin Reesink in 2004, that primarily focuses on the cultural implications of names and naming in Sabanê culture, and was also sponsored by WOTRO. This lack of documentation and information tends to be significant for Sabanê culture and language; while it appears in a number of works, it is usually only mentioned with very little information provided.

== Phonology ==
Sabanê has 16 phonemes — 11 consonants and 5 vowels. Each has different allophones.

=== Consonants ===
Sabanê's 11 consonants are shown in the table below.

		Bilabial	Alveolar	Velar	Glottal
Stops	plain	p	t	k	ʔ
Stops	implosive	ɓ	ɗ		
Nasals		m	n		
Fricatives			s		h
Laterals			l		

The consonants used in Sabanê are similar to those for the Northern Nambikwara languages, although there are no implosives in Latundê. However, the Southern Nambikwara languages have different phonemes such as glottalized and aspirated consonants as wells as only one implosive /ɗ/ and one affricate /tʃ/.

=== Vowels ===
Sabanê has 5 phonemic vowels, listed in the table below.

	Front	Central	Back
High	i		u
Mid	e		o
Low		a	

Once again the vowels used in Sabanê are similar to Northern Nambikwara, but vary when compared to Southern Nambikwara. Southern Nambikwara has a much larger vowel inventory, including creaky and nasal vowels.

== Morphology ==
The roots of nouns in Sabanê can only exist as parts of larger words (they are bound morphemes), and must be followed either by a referential suffix in isolation or by a referential or derivational suffix in context. There is no system for identifying a noun's gender morphologically, so gender must be inferred or indicated lexically. This is also the case for age and numbers. Possessive pronouns are not required. Compounding is used frequently, with the combined meanings of the individual words often being very different from the meaning of the final compound. There are seven different classifiers for nouns.

The verbal theme is composed of a verbal root and verbal suffix, however these verbal suffixes can be attached to adjectives and numerals to make them verbal adjectives and verbal numerals. That being said, adjectives are actually considered verbs due to structural similarity. Morphemes are used to indicate an imminent action, while suffixes are used to indicate supposition, hearsay desire, and negation. Sentences can be either assertive, interrogative, or imperative. While the assertive and interrogative moods are marked by suffixes, the imperative mood is unmarked.

=== Pronouns ===
Subject personal pronouns are mandatory in the absence of a nominal subject. There are two classes of personal pronouns: subject pronouns, which are free morphemes except for pi- and object pronouns, which are bound morphemes.

Person	Subject	Object	
Person	Subject	Before vowels and glides	Before consonants
1st person	towali	t-	ta-
2nd person	uli	m-	ma-
3rd person			a-
1st person plural	pi-	p-	pi-
2nd person plural	uli	m-	ma-
3rd person plural			a-

In Sabanê the pronouns uli and towali are free morphemes which means that they do not appear affixed to the verb.

towali ilaw -n -al -i
1SUBJ {to be big} -VS -PRES.NEUT -ASSR
'I am fat.'

uli wola kiki -n -datinan
2SUBJ {a lot} {to scratch} -VS -PRET.EV
'You scratch it a lot.'

The pronouns p-, m-, t-, a- and pi-, ma-, ta-, are all bound morphemes, therefore they appear prefixed on the verb.

uli pi- kal -i -dana
2SUBJ 1OBJ.PL- {to cut} -VS -PRES.EV
'You cut us.'

wayulu t- ip -i -datinan
dog 1OBJ- {to see} -VS -PRET.EV
'The dog saw me.'

towali -mi m- yotop -a -dana
1SUBJ -REF 2OBJ- {to know} -VS -PRES.EV
'I know you.'

Note that in Sabanê, the third person singular and plural subject are not phonologically expressed. The third person singular and plural object are only phonologically expressed when the verb begins with a consonant. (As seen below)

ileypelu a- kalit -i -al -i
today/now 3OBJ- {to cook} -VS -PRES.NEUT -ASSR
'S/he cooks it now.'

=== Negation of Verbs ===
In the Sabanê language, negation of a verb is not marked by a single word on its own like languages such as English or Portuguese. Instead, negation is marked by the particle -mi(si)na which is suffixed to the verbal theme. Because this particle is affixed to the verb it cannot stand by itself. Generally, the shorter form -mina is used more often that the longer form -misina.

kanaysi -k ii -n -mina -al -i
pepper -OBJ {to be hot} -VS -NEG -PRES.NEUT -ASSR
'The pepper is not hot.'

However, in cases where the progressive suffix -say is used, -mi(si)na can optionally occur after this progressive suffix instead of after the verbal suffix. Native speakers do this switching, but the meaning of the sentence does not change.

ani -n -say -mina -al -i
{to feel} -VS -PROG -NEG -PRES.NEUT -ASSR
'S/he is not pretending.'

Negation in the imperative mood is similarly obtained, by which the negative particle is suffixed to the verbal theme.

t- osa -n -mina
1OBJ- {to give} -VS -NEG
'Do not give it to me!'

Lastly, because -mi(si)na is a bound morpheme it can not grammatically form a sentence. This means that when responding to a question negatively, a full sentence must be constructed.

Question:

isun -i -al -a
{to be angry} -VS -PRES.NEUT -INTERR
'Is s/he angry?'

Grammatical answer:

isun -i -mina -al -i
{to be angry} -VS -NEG -PRES.NEUT -ASSR
'S/he is not angry.'

Ungrammatical answer:

* Mina.
*'No.'

=== Oppositional morphological marking of assertive and interrogative sentences ===
Most languages in the world do not morphologically express an opposition between assertive and interrogative sentences. That being said, Sabanê uses an assertive suffix (-i), and an interrogative suffix (-a), attached to neutral tense forms of verbs.

iney -i -ntal -i
{to fall} -VS -PRET.NEUT -ASSR
'S/he fell.'

While the few languages that do express a morphological opposition for assertive and interrogative sentences, they typically leave the assertive unmarked, while Sabanê marks both the assertive and the interrogative. The suffixes used to mark these 'moods' occupy the same syntactic slot, so the use of one suffix excludes the use of the other. In Sabanê the interrogative suffix must occur with a question word, such as 'who' or 'what'.

iney -i -ntal -a
{to fall} -VS -PRET.NEUT -INTERR
'Did s/he fall?'

== Syntax ==
=== Case and Agreement ===
In order to discuss Sabanê's case system, it is first important to define certain terms used to represent arguments of differing roles, and how they are used to classify case systems. These three terms are S, A, and P. S is used to describe the only nominal argument of a single-argument clause. A and P are used within multi-argument clauses however, with A describing the most-agent like argument and P describing the most patient-like argument. In Sabanê, patient S arguments of some intransitive verbs are marked the same as P arguments of transitive sentences, being marked by a -k. Conversely, A arguments as well as S arguments of transitive sentences are not marked. Given these conditions of Sabanê's system, it is categorized as Split Intransitive. A Split Intransitive case system is described as a system in which some S arguments are marked like transitive P arguments, while others are marked like transitive A arguments. The evolutionary process of this kind of system is typically made up of several successive developments over time, however given the lack of data for Sabanê the development of its particular split intransitivity is not known. The following examples are examples of the presence and absence of markings for S, A, and P arguments in Sabanê.

Patient S argument of intransitive verb (marked with -k)

towali kiata -k ilul -i -datinan
1SUBJ corn -OBJ {to eat} -VS -PRET.EV
'I ate corn.'

S argument of transitive verb unmarked

towali ilul -i -dana
1SUBJ {to eat} -VS -PRES.EV
'I eat.'

A argument of transitive sentence

Manoel t- osa -n -ntal -i anose -mi
Manoel 1OBJ- {to give} -VS -PRET.NEUT -ASSR bowl -REF
'Manoel gave me a bowl.'

Agentive pronouns are used in Sabanê to mark volitional verbs (controlled actions), while patientive pronouns are used to mark non-volitional verbs (uncontrolled actions). Below is a table of the agentive and patientive pronouns in Sabanê.

Pronouns
	agentive	patientive	
	agentive	before vowels and glides	before consonants
1st person	towali	t-	ta-
plural	pi-	p-	pi-
2nd person	uli	m-	ma-
3rd person			a-

While Sabane exhibits a split intransitive case system, this system has some specific rules. Objects expressed by nouns in transitive sentences must be marked by -k, and if it expressed by a pronoun the pronoun must be patientive. Subjects in transitive sentences are unmarked if they are a proper noun and the object is marked by -k.

Agreement markers in Sabanê do not exist, shown particularly through the lack of grammatical gender, and lack of morphological opposition between animate and inanimate objects.

== Semantics ==
=== Tense Structure ===
In Sabane, all sentences must include a tense morpheme, with the exception of sentences in the imperative mood. Unlike many other Brazilian languages, Sabane consists of three tenses: the past, the present and the future. These tense morphemes are bound morphemes (suffixes) that appear after the verbal theme or other verbal suffixes in a sentence. Additionally, in Sabane evidentiality and tense are combined into a single morpheme. This means that this language distinguishes between evidential events (sensory or inferential) and non-evidential/ neutral events (neutral or inferred neutral), which is all marked with tense.

- Note: the assertive morpheme -i or the interrogative morpheme -a can only be used to mark neutral tense.

	Evidential		Tense/Neutral	
	Sensory	Inferential	Neutral	Inferred Neutral
Preterit	-datinan	-tika	-ntal	-np
Present	-dana		-al	
Future	-telon		-tapanal	

==== Past ====
The past consists of four forms, which are morphologically marked and based on evidentiality and non evidentiality.

-ntal assumes neutrality in the sentence.

Manoel a- kan -n -ntal -i
Manoel 3OBJ- {to kill} -VS -PRET.NEUT -ASSR
'Manoel killed him.'

hay ay -i -ntal -a
already {to go} -VS -PRET.NEUT -INTERR
'Did s/he already go?'

-np is used when the speaker believes that an event could have happened based on inference.

m- yotop -i -np -i
2OBJ- {to know} -VS -PRET.NEUT.INFR -ASSR
'(One infers that) you knew it.'

m- yotop -i -np -a
2OBJ- {to know} -VS -PRET.NEUT.INFR -INTERR
'Did you know it (it seems you did)?'

-datinan is used when the hearer concludes that the sentence is factual based on the speaker's availability of sensory evidence.

wayulu -mi ip -i -datinan
dog -REF {to run} -VS -PRET.EV
'The dog ran.'

-tika is used when the speaker uses hearsay evidence for the factuality of an event. -tika is only found in sentences preceding evidential sentences.

may -i -mina -tika towali ay -i -telon
{to walk} -VS -NEG -PAST.INFR 1SUBJ {to go} -VS -FUT.EV
'He did not arrive (because of the fact that) I am leaving.'

The distinction between recent past (today) and less recent pass (yesterday and beyond) is expressed by using the adverbs ileypelu 'today' and ileytika 'yesterday'.

ileypelu a- kalit -i -datinan
today 3OBJ- {to cook} -VS -PRET.EV
'S/he cooked it today.'

ileytika a- kalit -i -ntal -i
yesterday 3OBJ- {to cook} -VS -PRET.NEUT -ASSR
'S/he cooked it yesterday.'

==== Present ====
There are two morphemes that are used to mark present tense in Sabane:

1. -al is used for the present neutral
2. -dana is used for the present evidential

-al assumes neutrality in the sentence

ilul -i -say -al -i
{to eat} -VS -PROG -PRES.NEUT -ASSR
'S/he is eating.'

-dana is used to infer factuality of the sentence and implies that there is sensory evidence

towali ilul -i -dana
1SUBJ {to eat} -VS -PRES.EV
'I eat.'

==== Future ====
There are two morphemes that are used to mark future tense in Sabane:

1. -tapanal is used for the neutral future
2. -telon is used for the evidential future

-tapanal can only be used in a non-factual or elicited sentence

ilul -i -tapanal -i
{to eat} -VS -FUT.NEUT -ASSR
'S/he will eat.'

-telon can only be used in a sentence in which the speaker is confident regarding its factuality

amayl -i -telon
{to rain} -VS -FUT.EV
'It is going to rain.'

== Vocabulary ==
=== Plant and animal names ===
Selected Sabanê plant and animal names from Antunes (2004):

Sabanê	Scientific name	English name	Portuguese name
akona	Magonia pubescens	tingüi tree	tingüi
akukuʔ	Cerdocyon thous	Brazilian wild dog	cachorro do mato
ali	Bradypus tridactylus	sloth	macaco-preguiça
alowa	Bactris setosa	jucum tree	jucum
aynasapa	Hancornia speciosa	mangaba fruit	mangaba
aʔoluʔ	Dasypus novemcinctus	tatu-galinha, an armadillo species	tatu-galinha
bisikuli	Eunectes murinus	anaconda	sucuriju
dalama	Oenocarpus bataua	batava palm	patoá
doda	Tayassu pecari	white-lipped peccary	queixada
kiayleli	Tayassu pecari	white-lipped peccary	queixada
hakonata	Spaeleoleptes spaeleus	harvestman	opilião, olupião
halakata	Caryocar brasiliense	pequi tree	pequi (árvore)
halasapa	Caryocar brasiliense	pequi fruit	pequi (fruta)
haybakata	Dialium guianense	pororoca tree	jutai-pororoca
hieynakata	Oenocarpus bacaba	kumbu palm	bacaba (árvore)
hieynasi	Oenocarpus bacaba	bacaba fruit	bacaba (fruta)
holokalikata	Attalea phalerata	urucuri palm	acuri
ila	Ateles sp.	spider-monkey	macaco-aranha
ilunakata	Caryocar brasiliense	wild pequi	pequi
ilunasi	Caryocar brasiliense	wild pequi nut	pequi (fruto)
ineyla	Metynnis maculatus	spotted pacu (fish)	pacu
iwimata	Tetragonisca angustula	jatai bee	jataí
kali	Ceratophrys ornata	horned frog	sapo-boi
kamanasi	Atta sexdens	female ant	tanajura
kanaysi	Capsicum frutescens	pepper	pimenta
kapiʔ	Nasua nasua	coati	quati
kapune	Cuniculus paca	paca	paca
kayno	Carapus fasciatus	tuvira fish	tuvira
kaynomoka	Gymnotus carapo	catfish	sarapó
kela	Ara ararauna	blue and yellow macaw	arara-amarela
kiawa	Chordeiles, Podager	bacurau bird	bacurau
kiluma	Testudo tabulata	jabuti	jabuti
kina	Tunga penetrans	sand flea	bicho-de-pé
kita	Socratea exorrhiza	rasp palm	paxiúba
kiwkiw	Solenopsis saevissima	fireant	formiga-lava-pés
kokwayli	Mazama americana	deer	veado
koluma	Typhlonectes compressicauda	caecilian	cobra-cega
kowayiti	Hirundo rustica	swallow	andorinha
kowayitipan	Progne chalybea domestica	gray-breasted martin	andorinha-azul
kuli	Myoprocta acouchy	agouti	cutia
kulima	Amburana cearensis	cerejeira tree	cerejeira
malasi	Penelope superciliaris jacucaca	rusty-margined guan	jacucaca
misa	Maximiliana regia	inaja palm	inajá
misakata	Maximiliana regia	inaja palm tree	inajá (árvore)
misasapa	Maximiliana regia	inaja palm nut	inajá (fruto)
misasi	Maximiliana regia	inaja palm seed	inajá (semente)
mukunapi	Enterolobium contortisiliquum	earpod tree	timbó
mulula	Priodontes giganteus	giant armadillo	tatu-canastra
nutupiʔ	Bixa orellana	urucu	urucu
olopa	Apis mellifera	European bee	abelha-mel
oluma	Tapirus terrestris	tapir	anta
ota	Guilelma speciosa	peach palm	siriva
owayli	Ozotoceros bezoarticus	red deer	veado-campeiro
oya	Mauritia vinifera	buriti palm	buriti
pasika	Brycon matrinchao	matrinxã fish	matrinxã
pawla	Pterophyllum	cará fish	cará
piowla	Hoplias malabaricus	wolf fish	traíra
puwisa	Crax globulosa	wattled curassow	mutum
salaymulita	Pyrilia barrabandi	curica bird	curica
sapa	Piscidia erythrina	woody wine, Jamaica dogwood	timbó
siliko	Eigenmannia trilineata	tuvira rajada fish	tuvira rajada
sopa	Esenbeckia leiocarpa	Brazilian boxwood	guarantã (árvore)
sowaw	Lebistes reticulatus	rainbow fish	piaba
sowawsi	Leporinus elongatus	piapara fish	piau
sopa	Esenbeckia leiocarpa	Brazilian boxwood tree	guarantã
takipa	Cebuella pygmaea	marmoset	sauim
talama	Tupinambis teguixin	teju	calangão
talawa	Ara chloroptera	red macaw	arara-vermelha
tapayli	Renealmia exaltata	pacoba tree	pacova
tapaytapay	Corallus caninus	emerald tree boa	cobra-papagaio
tokaliʔ	Bertholletia excelsa	Brazilian nut tree	castanheira
tomuʔtomuʔ	Penelope jacucaca	white-browed guan	jacucaca grande
totaliʔ	Tolypeutes tricinctus	three-banded armadillo	tatu-bola
towakaliʔ		red-head cayman	jacaré da cabeça vermelha
tutinakapawli	Aratinga jandaya	jandaya parakeet	jandaí
ulila	Tamandua tetradactyla	lesser ant-eater	tamanduá-mirim
ulima	Ficus anthelmintica	caxinguba tree	caxinguba
ulumusuʔ	Columbina minuta	dove	rolinha, pomba
ulununuʔ	Cebus capucinus	white-faced capuchin	macaco capuchino
uma	Hydrochoerus capybara	capybara	capivara
upa	Tinamus solitarius	macuca bird	macuco
ute	Eira barbara	tayra	irara
uykilapita	Lagothrix lagotricha	big bellied woolly monkey	macaco-barrigudo
wakawlu	Casmerodius albus egretta	heron	cegonha
walawaka	Ara macao	red and blue macaw	araracanga
walawka	Leporinus macrocephalus	piauçu fish	piauçu
walayena	Ramphastos toco	toucan	tucano
walaynunu	Egretta garzetta	little egret	garça
wani	Meleagris gallopavo	turkey	
wanisi	Rhea americana	rhea	ema
wawawsi	Trigona spinipes	arapuã	arapuã
waylinawa	Lutra platensis	otter	lontra
waylinun	Pteronura brasiliensis	beaver	ariranha
waypulukata	Campomanesia xanthocarpa	gabiroba tree	gabiroba (árvore)
waypulusapa	Campomanesia xanthocarpa	gabiroba fruit	gabiroba (fruta)
waysili	Euterpe precatoria	assai palm	açaí
wayulupi	Chrysocyon brachyurus	cat; guara-wolf	lobo-guará
wayulutapayli	Panthera onca	spotted jaguar	onça-pintada
wialakata, mialakata	Hymenaea courbaril	jatoba tree	jatobá (árvore)
wialasapa, mialasapa	Hymenaea courbaril	jatoba fruit	jatobá (fruta)
wiawlu	Tinamus sp.	tinamou bird	nambu
yalawoka	Maranta arundinacea	arrowroot	araruta
yalay	Euphractus sexcinctus	peludo armadillo	tatu-peba
yamotoka	Constrictor constrictor	boa	jibóia
yeyeyla	Pitangus sulphuratus	great kiskadee	bem-te-vi
yolola	Inga edulis	ice cream bean tree	ingá
yomotokamoka	Bothrops jararaca	viper	jararaca
yoto	Astrocaryum aculeatum	star-nut palm	tucum, tucumã
yowayli	Didelphis marsupialis	opossum	gambá
yowitakata	Saccharum officinarum	sugar cane	cana-de-açúcar
yubana	Colocasia esculenta	taro	taioba
