= Latundê language =

Nearly extinct Nambikwaran language

Latundê
- Native to: Brazil
- Ethnicity: Latundê
- Native speakers: 19 (2012)
- Language family: Nambikwaran: Northern; Roosevelt; Latundê

Language codes
- ISO 639-3: ltn
- Glottolog: latu1238

Latundê is a nearly extinct Nambikwaran language of Brazil, spoken by 19 people in 2012.

== History ==
Until the late 1970s, the Latundê were unknown to both other Indigenous groups and outsiders in the region.
