= Akuntsu language =

Endangered Tupian language of Brazil

Akuntsú
- Native to: Brazil
- Region: Rondônia
- Ethnicity: Akuntsu
- Native speakers: 3 (2022)
- Language family: Tupian: Eastern Tupian; Tuparí; Akuntsú

Language codes
- ISO 639-3: aqz
- Glottolog: akun1241
- ELP: Akuntsú
- Coordinates: 12°50′0″S 60°58′0″W

Akuntsú is a Tupian language of the Tupari branch of the state of Rondônia in Brazil, spoken by the 3 remaining Akuntsu people. Peaceful contact with the Akuntsú was only made in 1995; they had been massacred by cattle ranchers in the 1980s.

It is considered unlikely that the Akuntsu language or culture will survive following the deaths of the tribe's remaining members. For this reason several observers have described the tribe as the victims of genocide. The neighbouring Kanoê have been similarly reduced in number through contact with settlers, as were the people of a man recently encountered living alone in the Igarapé Omerê reserve who was apparently the sole survivor of his tribe, referred to as the Man of the Hole.

The name "Akuntsú" comes from the Kwaza language word akucũ 'outsider Indians'.

== Classification ==
Akuntsu is a Tupian language belonging to the Tupari subfamily. It is related to Tuparí, Kepkiriwát, Makuráp, Mekéns, Waratégaya, and Wayoró. Of these, it is most closely related to Mekéns, sharing approximately 79% of its vocabulary.

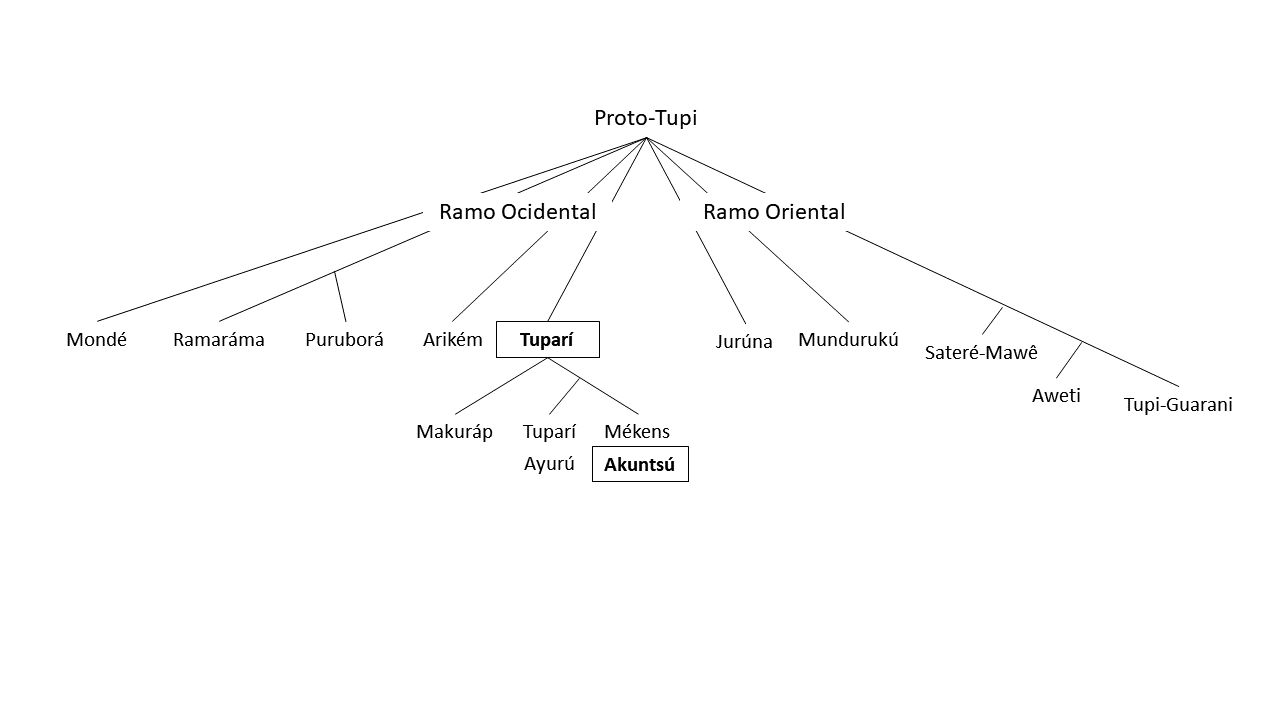
Portuguese family tree of the Tupian languages

== Phonology ==
=== Consonants ===
Akuntsu consonants are as follows:

Akuntsu consonants
		Bilabial	Alveolar	Palatal	Velar	
		Bilabial	Alveolar	Palatal	plain	lab.
Plosive	Voiceless	p	t		k	kʷ
Plosive	Voiced	b	d		g	
Affricate				tʃ		
Nasal		m	n		ŋ	
Flap			ɾ			
Approximant		w		j		

The velar nasal cannot occur word-initially.

=== Vowels ===
There are 5 vowels.

Vowels of Akuntsú
	Front	Central	Back
Close	i	ɨ	
Mid	e (ɛ)		o (u)
Open		a	

In general, Akuntsu syllables can be formed with a single vowel (V), as in /i’top/ ("look"); a consonant and a vowel (CV), for example in /taˈɾa/ ("wide"); or even one vowel and two consonants (CCV, VCC or CVC), see /ˈhat/ ("snake"), /ˈkwini/ ("fork") and /oˈajt/ ("butt"). Of these, CV is the most common.

== Morphology ==
There are four open classes of words in Acuntsú (nouns, adverbs, adjectives and verbs) and five closed classes (pronouns, postpositions, idiophones, interjections and particles).

=== Nouns ===
Nouns refer to concrete entities (such as epapap, "moon"). They can assume syntactic functions of arguments of verbs and postpositions, as well as being determinants or determinants in nominal determination relations and constituting the nuclei of nominal predicates.

==== Relational inflection ====
Relational inflection occurs through prefixes that inflect the noun. The determinant of the nouns is the immediately preceding syntactic expression.

Unlike Tuparí and Makuráp, both also from the Tuparí family, where mutually exclusive prefixes mark the contiguity and non-contiguity of determiners, Akuntsu distinguishes between nouns that combine with the ø- allomorph and those that combine with the t allomorph. - (which mark the contiguity of the determiner, non-contiguity being an unmarked case).

==== Causal inflection ====
Two suffixes determine causal inflection in Acuntsú: the locative -po and the determinative -et. The suffix -et gives nouns a specific and determined character. It is known to exist in the forms -t after a vowel and -et after a consonant.

==== Derivation ====
In Acuntsú there are suffixes that modify nouns (-tin, which attenuates them, and -atʃo, which intensifies them) and one that forms them. There is also the suffix -kʷa, which in addition to forming a verb does so by bringing the idea of continuity and repetition of the action.

==== Composition and reduplication ====
Another way to form names is the composition of nominal themes, such as the formation of ororope ("clothes") from ororo ("cotton") and pe ("coating"). The reduplication of the last syllable is also observed in Akuntsu, as in several other languages of the Tupian family and indicates plural, as between pi ("foot") and pipi ("feet").

=== Verbs ===
Verbs in Akuntsú are divided into transitive and intransitive verbs. In general, they differ in that only transitive verbs have objects and, in Akuntsú in particular, there are certain limitations regarding the suffixes that each verb can take.

Both, however, adopt the thematic suffix -a (in the case of verbs ending in /a/, -ø is used, and for verbs ending in /o/, it is replaced by -a - as in "ko", the verb "to eat", which becomes "ka"), which marks the verb in the most diverse constructions, independently of other inflections.

==== Derivation ====
Occurring through the addition of prefixes, suffixes and reduplication, the main role of derivation in verbs is to nominalize them or change their transitivity. For nominalization, the suffix -pa stands out, which determines circumstance (atʃo - "to wash", becomes atʃopa - "washer"), and the affix -i-, which only occurs in transitive verbs and forms a noun corresponding to the object resulting from the verb. An example is the formation of imi ("dead") from mi ("to kill"). The change in transitivity involves a causative structure. It can be obtained by adding the prefix mõ-, as in kara - mõkara ("to fall" - "to make [object] fall") or the suffix -ka as in morã - morãka ("to jump" - "to make [object] jump").

==== Tense, mood, and aspect ====
Unlike other languages of the Tupari family, which have a marker for the past, the only clear temporal information is given by the projective marker "kom", so that the language clearly distinguishes only the "future" and the "non-future".

The marker kom occurs at the end of sentences and indicates that an event will occur in the future, generally a certain event. An example would be tekarap ita kom ("the rain will come").

There are three other very important indicators of aspect, namely the suffix -ɾa, which indicates habitualness, the morpheme ekʷa, which indicates iteration, and the suffix -kʷa, which indicates repetition/continuity of the action. Examples are:

1. apara koara kom. ("I will eat bananas as usual")
2. eneme ekʷa. ("You will run many times")
3. Konibú imi ekʷa. ("Konibú hunted them")
4. oaawkʷa. ("I yawned continuously")

A peculiarity is that ekʷa, after an intransitive verb, represents an iteration of the action (2), while its presence after a transitive verb indicates an iteration of the object (3).

Reduplication is also an important process for the verbal aspect, occurring in the last syllable of the root, and also indicating iteration/repetition (for example, oøanam ãpika - oøanam ãpipika ["I pull my head" - "I pull and pull my head repeatedly"]).

As for the mood, Akuntsu uses the indicative mood, which has no explicit marking in the language, and is therefore the unmarked case, in addition to the imperative and interrogative moods. The imperative mood is evidenced by the suffix -tʃo, as in idaratʃo ("unfold it"). There is, however, the possibility that the imperative appears without marking (iko, "eat") The interrogative mood is marked by rising intonation and is divided between polar questions, which require affirmative or negative answers, and content questions, in which the answer concerns a specific point.

==== Auxiliaries ====
There are auxiliary verbs in Akuntsu, which express dynamic or static conditions of the subject and contribute to the aspect and directionality of the verb, in addition to being able to present information about the action not included in the semantics of the main verb. They appear at the end of the sentence (with the exception of the morpheme tʃe, also observed before the main verb (1)) and modify the entire construction, and can also occur as main verbs when alone. They are:

standing	ãm
seated	jã
lying down	toa
in motion	ko
coming	tʃe
going	ka

These markers contribute to aspect by expressing an ongoing event simultaneously with that of the main verb, as in mapi ata kom iko ("he is going to get the arrow").

=== Adverbs ===
Adverbs form a small open class of Akuntsu. Although they are not morphologically distinct from the adjective class, adverbs differ in syntax, since they cannot act as arguments of verbs. The function of adverbs is to add to the semantics of verbs, and they can occur before or after the verb they modify. The process of reduplication is important in adverbs, since it indicates an intensification or reiteration of the characteristic described. Reduplication itself can perform an adverbial function.

=== Adjectives ===
There are few adjectives in Acuntsú. They refer to abstractions such as sensations, colors, states, etc. (like akop, "hot"). They modify nouns and can be determined in nominal determination relations, as well as syntactically exercising the function of nuclei of nominal predicates.

=== Pronouns ===
Pronouns constitute a closed subclass and are divided into demonstrative and personal pronouns. Among personal pronouns, there are two series: series I encodes both the subject of nominal predicates and the agent of transitive predicates (see section 7.2). They can also act as the nucleus of adverbial phrases (when modified by the locative suffix) or as the emphatic subject of intransitive verbs. They are:

Person	Singular	Plural	Clitic	
1	on, one	kitʃe (inclusive), otʃe (exclusive)	o-	ki- (incl.), otʃe- (excl.)
2	en, ene	jat	e-	jat-
3	te	kejat	i-/t-, te- (referring to a previous subject)	

The second person plural is only used when a 3rd person not being referred to is included. Clitic pronouns mark the determiner of nouns, objects of transitive verbs and subjects of intransitive verbs.

Demonstrative pronoun	Translation/reference
eme	this/near the speaker
jȇ	this/near the speaker (sitting)
jȇrom	that/far from the speaker and close to the listener
(te)ike	away from the speaker and listener, approximately visible

=== Numerals ===
There are only two numerals in Akuntsu: kite ("one") and tɨɾɨ ("two"). To indicate larger numbers, the number two is reduplicated (tɨɾɨ tɨɾɨ is "four", for example). The numeral can appear before or after the noun it quantifies, but in studies of the language so far, it occurs before the noun more commonly. The numeral kite, in some contexts, can also mean "alone" (oɾẽbõ kite - "I am alone").

=== Postpositions ===
This class includes terms that appear after nouns and express some specific semantic notion. It is approximately equivalent to prepositions in languages such as English and Portuguese, but appears after the terms it determines due to the syntactic structure of Akuntsu

etʃe	diffuse locative	ek etʃe ka	(home locative go) go to the house
ete	relative/comitative	ta itek ete/en baj ete	that is [concerning] his house/is with the buriti
pi	Inessive	on tek pi tʃopa	see the inside of the house
na	Translative	ikop na	he is red

=== Particles ===
Particles constitute an closed class of words that can indicate evidentiality, demarcate the focus of a sentence, act as conjunctions, perform adverbial functions and even indicate existence.

== Syntax ==
=== Noun phrase ===
In Akuntsu nominal phrases, determined nouns are preceded by their respective determiners. They can also be modified by numerals, which can precede or follow the nouns they modify. There is no gender inflection of any kind, nor is there any number inflection in the noun.

==== Genitive constructions ====
The genitive constructions of Akuntsu are based on the combination of nouns in which the determiner precedes the determined, as in øpi, where pi is "foot" and ø- is a prefix that determines the relational inflection.

From this, nouns can be divided into a class of dependent or inalienable nouns, generally referring to parts of a whole or elements whose existence is related to something or someone (examples are ep ["leaf"] and op ["father"]), and independent or alienable nouns, usually plants, animals or elements of nature (e.g. waʔi ["stone"] and ororo ["cotton"]).

While among inalienable nouns genitive constructions are indispensable, among alienable nouns they only occur through mediators, i.e. the nominalizer -i- and the use of kinship names.

The first strategy is to nominalize transitive verbs, forming constructions such as øiko ("my food") from the verb ko ("to eat"). The other strategy involves a historical aspect of the Akuntsu language: since the Indians had their relatives killed (see section 2.1), the women of the group raised their animals as their children. Thus, kinship names mediate genitive constructions involving independent names of animals. An example is wako Tʃaroj ømempit ("the jacu is the son of Txarúi"), where a standard genitive construction occurs in ømempit ("woman’s son") associated with the alienable name wako ("jacu").

=== Verb phrase ===
Like nominal phrases, verbal phrases are composed of a verb determined by a determiner that precedes it. An important distinction occurs between intransitive verbs, which receive clitic pronouns to indicate their subject, and transitive verbs, which use independent personal pronouns as subjects according to specific rules.

An example of a verbal phrase with an intransitive verb is oakata, where o- is a clitic pronoun for the 1st person singular that functions as the subject of the verb akata ("to fall"), forming the phrase "I fell". For transitive verbs there is the presence of one or sometimes even two objects and only one clitic can accompany the verb.

==== Order and alignment ====
The default word order of Akuntsu is subject–object–verb. As for alignment, Acuntsú is considered an ergative-absolutive language. This is because the subject of intransitive verbs and the object of transitive verbs occur with the same treatment (in the form of clitic pronouns preceding the verb - absolutive case), while the subjects of transitive verbs occur with another treatment (separately in the sentence - ergative case). However, when the transitive sentence has the name of an inanimate element as the object, the ergative-absolutive alignment can be neutralized.

=== Interrogatives ===
Interrogative constructions in Akuntsu are divided into polar and content-based. The former require yes or no answers and are marked by rising intonation. The latter generally occur with particles that begin the sentence (with the exception of "ne", which occurs at the end) and specify the objective of the question. These particles are:

aɾop	who/what/for what/whose	aɾop teimi? ("what is he going to hunt?")
taɾa	what/who	taɾa ijã? ("what is this?")
ãka	how/when	ãka tetʃeta? ("how is he going away?")
ẽɾom	where	ẽɾom itʃoka ne? ("where he can build [this]?")
ne	Hypothetical construction	enibõ ne? ("Is this for the network?")

== Vocabulary ==
=== Loanwords ===
With the expansion of contact between the Akuntsus and FUNAI groups that do not speak the language, in addition to idiophones, Akuntsú speakers incorporated words from the Kanoê language and Portuguese into their vocabulary, in order to make themselves understood by non-speakers. Examples include:

Loan from Portuguese	Portuguese	Translation	Loan from Kanoê	Translation
[ma'hadu]	machado	axe	[uˈɾɛ]	pig
[ˈdʒuka]	açúcar	sugar	[tʃeˈɾe]	see
[baˈkãw]	facão	machete	[kãˈni]	child
[piˈtʃi]	peixe	fish	[iˈwɛ]	pain
[mãdʒiˈuka]	mandioca	cassava	[kuˈni]	water
[aˈhoj]	arroz	rice	[muˈkujẽ]	sleep
