= Nominative–absolutive alignment =

Type of morphosyntactic alignment

In linguistic typology, nominative–absolutive alignment is a type of morphosyntactic alignment in which the sole argument of an intransitive verb shares some coding properties with the agent argument of a transitive verb and other coding properties with the patient argument ('direct object') of a transitive verb. It is typically observed in a subset of the clause types of a given language (that is, the languages which have nominative–absolutive clauses also have clauses which show other alignment patterns such as nominative-accusative and/or ergative-absolutive).

The languages for which nominative–absolutive clauses have been described include the Cariban languages Panare (future, desiderative, and nonspecific aspect clauses) and Katxuyana (imperfective clauses), the Northern Jê languages Canela (evaluative, progressive, continuous, completive, and negated clauses), Kĩsêdjê (progressive, continuous, and completive clauses, as well as future and negated clauses with non-pronominal arguments), and Apinajé (progressive, continuous, and negated clauses), as well as in the main clauses of the Tuparian languages (Makurap, Wayoró, Tuparí, Sakurabiat, and Akuntsú).

== Examples ==
=== Northern Jê ===
In the Northern Jê language Canela, different main clause constructions present different combinations of alignment patterns, including split-S (default), ergative–absolutive (recent past), and nominative–absolutive (evaluative, progressive, continuous, completive, and negated clauses). An example of the latter alignment type is given below.

intransitive

Wa ha iwrỳc naare.
/wa ha i-wɾɘ-k nãːɾɛ/
1.NOM IRR 1.ABS-descend-NF NEG
S TAM s-V AUX
'I will not descend.'

transitive

Wa ha ipyr naare.
/wa ha i-pɨ-ɾ nãːɾɛ/
1.NOM IRR 3.ABS-take-NF NEG
A TAM p-V AUX
'I will not grab it.'

In nominative–absolutive clauses, the sole argument of an intransitive verb (S) is aligned with the agent argument of a transitive verb (A) in that both may be expressed by nominative pronouns, such as wa ‘I.NOM’ or ca ‘you.NOM’ (nouns do not take case inflection in Canela), which occupy the same position in a phrase (in the example above, both precede the irrealis marker ha). At the same time, the sole argument of an intransitive verb (S) is aligned with the patient argument ('direct object') of a transitive verb (P) in that both may be indexed on the verb by person prefixes of the absolutive series (such as i- ‘I.ABS’ or a- ‘you.ABS’). There are no elements which pattern as ergative or accusative in this type of clauses in Canela.

The historical origin of the nominative–absolutive clauses in Canela has been shown to be a reanalysis of former biclausal constructions (a split-S matrix clause, headed by the auxiliary, and an ergative–absolutive embedded clause, headed by the lexical verb) as monoclausal, with the loss of the ergative.

=== Cariban ===
In the Cariban language Panare, future, desiderative, and nonspecific aspect clauses instantiate the nominative–absolutive alignment. An example is given below.

Yutësejpa (këj) kën.
/j-u-tə-sehpa (kəh) kən/
3-S_{A}-go-FUT 3.ANIM.COP 3.ANIM.DIST
s-V s.AUX S
‘S/he will go.’

Yamasejpa (këj) kën.
/j-ama-sehpa (kəh) kən/
3-S_{A}-throw.away-FUT 3.ANIM.COP 3.ANIM.DIST
p-V a.AUX A
‘S/he will throw away it/him/her.’

In Panare nominative–absolutive clauses, the nominative and absolutive are distinguished as follows. The unmarked nominative noun or pronoun (if it occurs explicitly) always follows the predicate (kën in the example above), with nominative agreement in the auxiliary if there is one (këj in the example above). In contrast, the absolutive arguments are indexed by means of verbal prefixes (y- in the example above) or by absolutive nouns phrases (not shown above), which are in a complementary distribution with the absolutive person prefixes.

=== Tuparian ===
In the languages of the Tuparian branch, main clauses commonly instantiate the nominative–absolutive pattern. Person prefixes on the verb are absolutive, i.e., they index the sole argument of an intransitive verb (S) and the patient argument ('direct object') of a transitive verb (P). Person pronouns, which follow the verb (either cliticizing to it or not) are nominative: they may encode the sole argument of an intransitive verb (S) or the agent argument of a transitive verb (A), but not the patient of a transitive verb (P). The example below is from Wayoró.

Eamõjan (en).
/e-amõc-a-t (ẽt)/
2-dance-TH-NFUT (2.NOM)
s-V (S)
‘You danced.’

Etopkwap nã on.
/e-top-kʷ-a-p nã õt/
2-see-PL-TH-p FUT 1.NOM
p-V {} A
‘I’ll see you every day.’

== See also ==
- Ergative–absolutive language
- Nominative–accusative language
- Split ergativity
