= Akuntsu =

Indigenous people of the Amazon

Total population
- 4 (2026)

Regions with significant populations
- Brazil (Rondônia)

Languages
- Akuntsu

Religion
- Animism

Related ethnic groups
- Kanoê

The Akuntsu (also known as Akunt'su or Akunsu) are an Indigenous people of Rondônia, Brazil. Their land is part of the Rio Omerê Indigenous Territory, a small Indigenous territory which is also inhabited by a group of Kanoê. The Akuntsu were victims of a massacre perpetrated by Brazilian cattle ranchers in the 1980s and currently number just three individuals. It is unlikely that the Akuntsu language or culture will survive after their deaths, leading several observers to describe them as victims of genocide.

== Culture ==
The Akuntsu are primarily hunter-gatherers, but supplement their diet with some swidden agriculture. Game is particularly abundant in their reserve because it acts as a refuge for animals whose habitats have been destroyed by deforestation in the surrounding area. The Akuntsu have a typical material culture for the region and practice various shamanic rituals. The Akuntsu language is spoken only by members of the tribe and not fully understood by any outsider. It belongs to the Tuparí language family.

== Pre-contact history ==
The Akuntsu are considered an "isolated tribe" by the Brazilian government, having only recently come into contact with global state societies. They were not officially contacted by the Fundação Nacional dos Povos Indígenas (FUNAI) until 1995. The word Akuntsu is an exonym applied to the tribe by the Kanoê, who were contacted shortly before the Akuntsu, meaning roughly "other Indians". The nearby Tupari are also recorded as knowing of a group called the 'Akontsu' or 'Wakontsón' whom they had never visited. In both cases, the Akuntsu had a reputation for being "dangerous" and seemingly had little contact with neighbouring indigenous peoples. In an incident that took place some time before 1996, a Kanoê family, the sole survivors of a massacre, attempted to contact the Akuntsu to find marriage partners. The Akuntsu resisted these overtures and in the conflict that followed a Kanoê woman was killed by the Akuntsu. Although one of the Kanoê did become pregnant by an Akuntsu man, tensions continued and the Kanoê eventually moved away from the Akuntsu at the suggestion of FUNAI workers.

Before official contact, the Akuntsu had violent confrontations with colonists, loggers and cattle ranchers who began entering their land in the 1970s, after the construction of a highway. The seven survivors encountered in 1995 reported an attack by armed cattle ranchers some time around 1990, in which the majority of the tribe was killed. Several of the survivors possessed scars and bullets lodged in their bodies. FUNAI had previously discovered the site of the massacre: an Akuntsu village, home to around 30 people, which had been bulldozed in an attempt to cover up the evidence. At least fifteen were killed in this attack, which is thought to have been motivated by the knowledge that if the Akuntsu were officially contacted the forest would be declared an indigenous reserve and closed off to logging and cattle ranching.

== Post-contact history ==
A FUNAI team had been attempting to make contact with isolated indigenous groups in Corumbiara since 1985, following reports made the previous year. Farmers in the area, however, consistently denied the presence of any indigenous people in the area and FUNAI issued the opinion that if uncontacted tribes had been there, they had since moved on. In December 1986, a state interdiction on the area that had been put in place for FUNAI to conduct its search was lifted and farmers, cattle ranchers and loggers were able to resume legal expansion into the forest. The leader of the FUNAI team, however, continued searching and in 1995 encountered the Kanoê who in turn informed them of the Akuntsu. When an expedition finally made official contact with the Akuntsu in October of that year the tribe numbered seven: two men, three adult women and two young girls. The 26,000-hectare Igarapé Omerê Indigenous Territory was created for the Akuntsu and Kanoê, but the area of protected forest is still threatened by loggers and cattle ranchers which FUNAI have been unable to eject. In January 2000, the youngest girl died when a tree fell on her father's house during a storm. In October 2009, the oldest member of the group, Ururú, died. In 2016, the shaman and chieftain of the Akunstu, Konibu, died in his sleep, bringing the remaining population down to three women: Babawru, Pugapia and Aiga.

It is considered unlikely that the Akuntsu language or culture will survive following the deaths of the tribe's remaining members. For this reason several observers have described the tribe as the victims of genocide. The neighbouring Kanoê have been similarly reduced in number through contact with settlers, as were the people of the so-called Man of the Hole, an individual living alone in the Igarapé Omerê reserve who was believed the sole survivor of his tribe.

On December 8, 2025, after three decades without registering any births, a boy was born. The birth of a child was made possible through the union of Babawru Akuntsú, approximately 42 years old, and Purá, approximately 46 years old, from the Kanoê people. Despite belonging to different ethnic groups, Akuntsú and Kanoé are the only peoples who maintain daily contact in the region. The birth was attended by indigenous health teams, with medical support in Vilhena, respecting customs and ensuring the safety of the mother and child.

== See also ==
- Awá (Brazil)
- Genocide of indigenous peoples in Brazil
- Indigenous rights
- Survival International
