= League of Poor Peasants =

Peasant organization in Brazil

- Liga Dos Camponeses Pobres
- Predecessor: Landless Workers' Movement
- Formation: 1995
- Legal status: Marxist social movement
- Region served: Rondônia; Minas Gerais; Bahia; Pará
- Methods: Land occupation (squatting), Collectivized farming, Health and educational services, Armed violence (allegedly)

The League of Poor Peasants (Portuguese: Liga dos Camponeses Pobres, LCP) is a left-wing farmer organization based in Brazil. The LCP was formed in 1995 in reaction to the Corumbiara Massacre, when landless activists in Rondônia were killed by police and armed mercenaries. Much of the League was drawn from the Landless Workers' Movement (MST) after dissatisfaction with its agrarian reformism.

The LCP takes a radical approach to the peasant situation, supporting the occupation and transformation of large estates into productive collectives structured under People's Power Assemblies. These assemblies determine both short and long-term planning and development for the collectives, as well as its conduct.

Although not a guerrilla organization, the militancy of the LCP has brought it into much conflict with the Brazilian government, which often coordinates police interventions towards occupied camps and associated activists. The group also has faced death threats and selected assassinations from hired gunmen which the League claims is a collaborated effort between the government and landowners.

== History ==
In August 1995, while landless peasants occupied the Santa Elina farm in Corumbiara in the Brazilian state of Rondônia, military police and hired gunmen entered the farm and began an attack against the occupants, who fired back. Two police officers and 9 occupying peasants were killed, including a child, this would later become known as the Slaughter of Corumbiara (Massacre de Corumbiara).

In the aftermath of the slaughter, groups of peasants split from the local Landless Workers' Movement (MST) leadership and founded the LCP. This split resulted from MST's alleged collaboration with the authorities, informing them of the names of peasants who occupied the Santa Elina farm. The seceding members denounced MST as "opportunist and conciliatory".

In 2021, peasants from the LCP carried out a procession in honor of former leader of the Communist Party of Peru (Shining Path), Abimael Gúzman.

In 2025, Brazilian army killed a peasant in Rondonia who was affiliated with the LCP, alleging that the LCP was in the initial stages of constructing an insurgency against the Brazilian government.

== Ideology ==
Despite there being little information regarding LCP's official political line, they adhere to socialism. They frequently express support for Marxist–Leninist-Maoist parties and organizations from around the world, such as the Indian PLGA and the Peruvian PCP. The LCP has also received expressed support from foreign communists, especially maoist groups such as French GRC,^{a} AIAI (Anti-Imperialist Action Ireland), Swedish Proletarian Action and the Communist Party of Ecuador – Red Sun

The LCP has also endorsed concepts from Marxist, Leninist and Maoist politics, such as People's War, semifeudalism and capitalist imperialism.

According to the LCP's publication Nosso Caminho (Our Path), the organization's general program outlines the goals for an agrarian revolution in the Brazilian countryside to replace latifundia with collective production and structure. The general program is defined by 15 points:

1. The end of the latifundia; all land to the tillers
2. The land with social destination according to interests of the majority of the people and the nation
3. Nationalization of land and large rural capitalist enterprises as the final objective
4. A new agricultural and credit policy to make small and medium landownership economically viable
5. The creation and promotion of agro-villages and industrial application in every rural region
6. The creation of a health system with needed infrastructure in the countryside
7. The creation of an education system, A School of a New Type, centered on production and class struggle
8. Independent social and political organization based on the direct democracy of People's Assemblies
9. Special policy for the dry (semi-arid) northeast region
10. Special policy for the Amazon region
11. Support for the city worker struggle; strengthen the worker/peasant alliance
12. Recognition and support for the self-determination of indigenous nations and peoples
13. Strengthen and develop the masses' ideology/politics towards land collectivization as a final objective
14. A new economy, a new culture, a new politics of new democracy, and a new People's Democratic Power
15. Internationalist solidarity with the struggle of peoples against imperialism and for progress

== See also ==
- Agriculture in Brazil

== Notes ==
^aGroupe Révolutionnaire Charlatan
