= Tanaru Indigenous Territory =

Indigenous territory in Rondônia, Brazil

- Terra Indígena Tanaru
- Location within Brazil
- Coordinates: 12°39′14″S 61°21′54″W
- Area: 8,070 ha (31.2 sq mi)
- Designation: Indigenous territory
- Created: 1 November 2012 (declared)

The Tanaru Indigenous Territory (Portuguese: Terra Indígena Tanaru) is an indigenous territory in the Legal Amazon, with an area of approximately 8,070 hectares (19,900 acres), located in the southeast of the Brazilian state of Rondônia, inhabited by the Tanaru, Kanoê and Akuntsu. The area is registered with the CRI and the Union Heritage Secretariat (SPU) under ordinance no. 1,392 from October 2012 (DOU of 1 November 2012).

The region is named after the nearby Tanaru River, which is a hydronym from the Kanoê or Kwaza language isolates. The National Indigenous People Foundation (FUNAI) operates in this area through the "Cacoal" Regional Coordination and the Guaporé Ethnoenvironmental Protection Front (FPE-Guaporé).

== Geography ==
The Tanaru Indigenous Territory is located in Rondônia at the four municipalities of Chupinguaia, Corumbiara, Parecis and Pimenteiras do Oeste. The territory has an area of 8,070 hectares (19,900 acres). Pimenteiras do Oeste accounts for the largest portion of the region's land distribution, with 3,980.16 hectares (9,835.2 acres), which represents 49.32% of the total area. It is followed by Corumbiara with 2,418.87 hectares (5,977.2 acres) or 29,96%, Parecis with 937.19 hectares (2,315.8 acres) or 11,61% and Chupinguara with 764.82 hectares (1,889.9 acres) or 9,47%. This territory has been inhabited by the Tanaru, Kanoê and Akuntsu.

The region is located in the Madeira River watershed and is part of the Amazon biome, with vegetation consisting of semideciduous forest (64.81%) and savanna (35.19%).

== History ==
In October 2012, the area was registered with the CRI and the Union Heritage Secretariat (SPU) through ordinance no. 1,392/2012 (DOU of November 2012).

In December 2022, the Federal Public Ministry of Brazil sued the Union and Funai to compel these federal bodies to transform the region into a socio-environmental protection area. Despite the presence of indigenous people in the area, such as the Kanoé and Akuntsú (groups with recent contact), Funai has never conducted the anthropological study for the delimitation and official recognition of the TI, which is currently a Restricted-Use Area. Indigenous land regularization occurs when the region is permanently inhabited, is a place for physical-cultural reproduction, and is also an area for productive activities. Therefore, Funai must prepare the identification report; then, the Minister of Justice declares the boundaries and demarcation of the region; Funai conducts the demarcation, which is then ratified by the Brazilian presidency.

The Coordenação das Organizações Indígenas da Amazônia Brasileira (COIAB) requested the Federal Court to integrate it into the process of recognizing this area as a traditional indigenous territory and a socio-environmental protection area as an amicus curiae.

Opposing the Federal Public Ministry’s process to transform the area into a socio-environmental protection area, the cattle rancher Gutemberg Ermita and two other families claim in Federal Court to be the legitimate owners of the restricted-use area. The children of small rural producers from Colatina, Espírito Santo, they settled in the Amazon in 1973, seeking a new area for cattle ranching.

== Protection ==
In 2007, traditional peoples, including Indigenous peoples, were recognized by the Brazilian government through the Política Nacional de Desenvolvimento Sustentável dos Povos e Comunidades Tradicionais (PNPCT), for their way of life linked to natural resources and the natural environment in a harmonious way and for their communal land use. This reaffirmed the Indigenous right to their traditional land and government protection, and the Fundação Nacional dos Povos Indígenas (FUNAI) operates in this area through: the "Cacoal" Regional Coordination of the Secretaria Especial de Saúde Indígena "Vilhena," and with the Tanaru Ethnoenvironmental Protection Services (SEPE-Tanaru) from the Guaporé Ethnoenvironmental Protection Front (FPE-Guaporé).

Between 2019 and 2021, the Brazilian government intensified actions to protect isolated and recently contacted Indigenous peoples during the COVID-19 pandemic. Implementing quarantine measures such as: sanitary barriers and access control posts, monitoring people flow, and preventing the entry of non-Indigenous people; extended periods of team stays in the regions; contingency plans for the Special Indigenous Health Districts (DSEI) for isolated and recently contacted Indigenous peoples; combating illegal and predatory extractivist actions in the indigenous territory; monitoring expeditions for isolated Indigenous peoples in the following areas: Tanaru, Massaco, Piripkura, Kawahiva, Himarimã, Ituna/Itatá, and Uru-Eu-Wau-Wau. The actions occurred in partnership with various agencies: the Army, the Federal Police, the National Indian Foundation (FUNAI), and the Instituto Brasileiro do Meio Ambiente e dos Recursos Naturais Renováveis (IBAMA).

According to the Indigenous Peoples in Brazil program of the Instituto Socioambiental (ISA), Rondônia is the fourth Brazilian state with the most Indigenous peoples, with 29 recognized peoples. And according to the Brazilian Institute of Geography and Statistics (IBGE), there were 21,153 Indigenous people in Rondônia (1.25% of Brazil's population).

== Threats ==
The Indigenous land is threatened by farmers, and by 2018 it had suffered 14.16% of deforestation. It is also under pressure from the infrastructure project of the PCH Cesar Filho.

== See also ==
- Man of the Hole
