= Tanaru =

Tanaru can refer to:

- Tanaru River, in Brazil
- Tanaru Indigenous Territory, named after the Tanaru River which runs through it
- Tanaru Indians, an extinct tribe that lived in the Tanaru Indigenous Territory
- Man of the Hole, the last surviving Tanaru Indian, also simply known as "Tanaru" due to his real name being unknown
