= Corumbiara (film) =

2009 documentary film by Vincent Carelli

- Directed by: Vincent Carelli (pt)
- Distributed by: Vídeo nas Aldeias
- Release date: 29 March 2009
- Running time: 117 minutes
- Country: Brazil
- Language: Portuguese

Corumbiara (English: Corumbiara: They Shoot Indians, Don't They?) is a 2009 Brazilian documentary film, directed by Vincent Carelli (pt). The film won three awards at 37th Gramado Film Festival including Best Picture.

== Content ==
A then-50-something man, living alone in the Amazon, for 22 years, after the last of his tribe, a group of six members, were murdered by farmers in 1995, was photographed by a filmmaker who accompanied FUNAI on a monitoring trip and is shown very briefly in this documentary. Monte Reel wrote The Last of the Tribe: The Epic Quest to Save a Lone Man in the Amazon about him.

== Awards ==
Gramado Film Festival

1. Best Picture
2. Best Direction
3. Best Film Editing

14th São Paulo International Documentary Festival

1. Honorable Mention

IV São Paulo Latin American Film Festival

1. Best Picture (Popular Jury)

Montreal First Peoples' Festival

1. Best Documentary

== See also ==
- Ishi
- slaughter of Corumbiara,
