= Kepkiriwát language =

Extinct Tupian language of Brazil

Kepkiriwát
- Kepkeriwát
- Native to: Brazil
- Region: Rondônia
- Ethnicity: Kepkiriwát
- Extinct: 1950s
- Language family: Tupian: Tuparí; Kepkiriwát

Language codes
- ISO 639-3: kpn
- Glottolog: kepk1241
- Linguasphere: 88-GAC-aa

Kepkiriwát (Quêpi-quiri-uáte) is an extinct Tupian language of the state of Rondônia, in the Amazon region of Brazil.

== Vocabulary ==
Loukotka (1949) compiles two wordlists of Kepkiriwát, one from an anonymous wordlist, and a manuscript sent in 1924 to the archives of Manaus by Joaquim Gondim, an employee of the Indian Protection Service (SPI).

Kepkiriwát vocabulary
Gloss	Kepkiriwát (Anonymous)	Kepkiriwát (Gondim)	Comparison
tree		kêba	
bow	taká		
white	kerára	ki-rará	
to drink	yukamon		Tupi eú
canoe	amišá	anišá	
dog		a-urê	Tupi yauara
crocodile	erà	irà	
tooth	ñain	iñãin	Mundurukú noi
water	aman, eman	amãni	
to hear		uapia	
star	mãã, mũá	mê-uãn	
woman	boêi	buhi	
fire	garambí	garãmbi	
arrow	yekũp	oikêp	Kawahíb yerau
large	uerê	uêre	Emerillon düu
ax	teá	tiá	
man	nãkuête	nakuête	
