= Corumbiara massacre =

1995 violent conflict in Rondônia, Brazil

Slaughter of Corumbiara
- Location: Corumbiara, Rondônia, Brazil
- Date: August 9, 1995; ~3:00 AM (BRT (UTC−3))
- Target: Landless workers
- Attack type: Massacre
- Deaths: 12 officially (disputed up to 100)
- Injuries: 55+
- Perpetrators: Military Police, gunmen hired by local landowners
- Motive: Suppression of land occupation by landless workers

The Slaughter of Corumbiara was a violent conflict that occurred on August 9, 1995, in the municipality of Corumbiara, located in the state of Rondônia, Brazil. The conflict erupted when police forces, alongside gunmen recruited from local farms, attacked a group of landless workers who were occupying an area of unproductive land. The violence resulted in the deaths of 12 people, including a nine-year-old child and two policemen.

== Background ==
In the early 1990s, Brazil was marked by significant agrarian conflicts, particularly in regions like Rondônia, where large unproductive estates were common. The Movimento dos Trabalhadores Rurais Sem Terra (MST), or Landless Workers' Movement, was at the forefront of these conflicts, advocating for land reform and the redistribution of unproductive land to landless farmers.

Since 1985, local peasants in Rondônia had organized and created several communities, such as Alto Guarajús, Verde Seringal, Palmares do Oeste, Rondolândia, and later the town of Nova Esperança, which eventually became the city of Corumbiara. By 1995, these communities faced significant opposition from local landowners and state forces.

== Occupation of Santa Elina Farm ==
In early August 1995, approximately 600 farmers, mobilized by the MST, organized to occupy the Santa Elina farm in Corumbiara. The farm, considered a large and unproductive estate, became the target of this occupation. The landless workers established a camp on the farm as part of their protest against the concentration of land ownership in the hands of a few.

== The Massacre ==
On the morning of August 9, at around 3 a.m., the camp at Santa Elina farm was violently attacked. The attackers included gunmen hired by local landowners, as well as Military Police officers who had their faces covered. The coordinated assault led to a violent confrontation that left twelve people dead, including a nine-year-old child and two policemen. Many others were wounded in the attack.

The official death toll is 16, with seven people reported missing. However, survivors and activists claim that the number of fatalities could have exceeded 100, with many bodies allegedly buried secretly by police and gunmen. After hours of gunfire, the peasants ran out of ammunition for their shotguns. The Special Operations Command, led by Captain José Hélio Cysneiros Pachá, deployed tear gas and spotlights against the families. The massacre occurred during the state government of Valdir Raupp (PMDB), who was later elected Senator for Rondônia.

Women were reportedly used as human shields by police and gunmen working for the landowner Antenor Duarte. A young girl named Vanessa, only six years old, was killed by a stray bullet while running with her family. Fifty-five squatters were seriously injured. Autopsies revealed evidence of summary executions. The bishop of Guajará-Mirim, Dom Geraldo Verdier, collected samples of charred bones from campfires at the scene and sent them to the Faculté de Médicine Paris-Ouest, which confirmed the cremation of human bodies at the camp.

== Aftermath and Impact ==
The massacre at Corumbiara became one of the most infamous examples of the brutal land conflicts in Brazil during this period. The aftermath saw increased scrutiny of Brazil's land reform policies and the actions of both state and private forces in rural conflicts. Despite the international outcry, the legal consequences for those involved in the massacre were limited, with few being held accountable for the violence.

Airton Ramos de Morais, a Military Police soldier, was sentenced to 18 years in prison; Daniel da Silva Furtado, also a Military Police soldier, received 16 years; Captain Vitório Régis Mena Mendes was sentenced to 19.5 years; Claudemir Gilberto Ramos, an occupant of the Santa Elina farm, received 8 years and 6 months; and Cícero Pereira Leite Neto, another farm occupant, was sentenced to 6 years and 2 months.

The judicial process for the compensation of the victims' families is still ongoing, with the Catholic Church's Pastoral Land Commission (CPT RO) and the Justice and Peace Commission of Porto Velho (CJP) providing legal support.

In 2013, the Commission on Constitution, Justice and Citizenship (CCJ) approved a proposal to grant amnesty to both the landless workers and the Military Police involved in the massacre. This proposal was controversial, as it initially aimed to pardon only the landless workers but was later expanded to include the police.

== See also ==
- Eldorado dos Carajás massacre - Another significant land conflict in Brazil that occurred in 1996.
