= Wayoró language =

Tuparian language of Brazil

Wayoró
- Wayoro, Ajurú, Wajuru
- wayoro emẽto
- Pronunciation: [βajoˈɾo ɛmɛ̃ˈto]
- Region: Rondônia (Brazil)
- Ethnicity: ~250 Wajuru (FUNASA/SESAI 2016)
- Native speakers: 3 (2019); 11 semispeakers (2019)
- Language family: Tupian: Tuparí; Wayoró
- Dialects: Ngwayoroiat (Wayoroiat); Kupndiiriat

Language codes
- ISO 639-3: wyr
- Glottolog: wayo1238
- ELP: Wayoró
- Linguasphere: 88-GAE-a

Wayoró (also Wayoro, Ajurú, Wajuru; Wayoró: wayoro emẽto [βajoˈɾo ɛmɛ̃ˈto]) is a moribund Tuparian language (Tupian family), which is spoken in the state of Rondônia, in the Amazon region of Brazil. As of 2019, there were reported to be 3 speakers (all above 70 years old) and 11 semispeakers out of the ethnic population of approximately 250.

== Dialects ==
The Wajuru people is subdivided into three subgroups: the Ngwayoroiat (‘those from the Stone’), the Ngwãkũyãian (‘the Agouti ones’), and the Kupndiiriat (‘the Forest ones’). Some lexical and phonological differences have been reported between the varieties spoken by the Ngwayoroiat (Wayoroiat) and by the Kupndiiriat.

== Phonology ==
=== Consonants ===
The graphemes which correspond to each phoneme are given in ⟨brackets⟩.

Consonant inventory
	labial	alveolar	palatal	velar	labio-velar	glottal
plosive	p ⟨p⟩	t ⟨t⟩	tʃ ⟨tx⟩	k ⟨k⟩	kʷ ⟨kw⟩	[ʔ] ⟨’⟩ (Note: Occurs in the onset position only (e.g. o’uwa [oʔʉβa] ‘my pot’, o’ega [oʔɛga] ‘my hiccup’, apa’a [apaʔa] ‘to weave a hammock horizontally’). The phonological status is given as uncertain by Nogueira (2019).)
nasal	m ⟨m, mb⟩	n ⟨n, nd⟩	ɲ ⟨y, dj⟩	ŋ ⟨ng, g⟩	ŋʷ ⟨ngw, gw⟩	
sonorant	β ⟨w⟩	ɾ ⟨r⟩				

Underlying nasal consonants may be partially or fully oralized in oral environments. Nogueira (2019) describes the following allophones:

- /m/ → [m] ⟨m⟩, [mb] ⟨mb⟩
- /n/ → [n] ⟨n⟩, [nd] ⟨nd⟩
- /ɲ/ → [ɲ, j, j̃, jᵗ] ⟨y⟩, [ndʒ, dʒ] ⟨dj⟩
- /ŋ/ → [ŋ, ŋg] ⟨ng⟩, [g] ⟨g⟩
- /ŋʷ/ → [ŋʷ, ŋgʷ] ⟨ngw⟩, [gʷ] ⟨gw⟩

=== Vowels ===
Vowel inventory
		front		central		back	
		short	long	short	long	short	long
high	oral	i ⟨i⟩	iː ⟨ii⟩	ʉ ⟨u⟩	ʉː ⟨uu⟩		
high	nasal	ĩ ⟨ĩ⟩	ĩː ⟨ĩi⟩	ʉ̃ ⟨ũ⟩	ʉ̃ː ⟨ũu⟩		
mid	oral	ɛ ⟨e⟩	ɛː ⟨ee⟩			o ⟨o⟩	oː ⟨oo⟩
mid	nasal	ɛ̃ ⟨ẽ⟩	ɛ̃ː ⟨ẽe⟩			õ ⟨õ⟩	õː ⟨õo⟩
low	oral			a ⟨a⟩	aː ⟨aa⟩		
low	nasal			ã ⟨ã⟩	ãː ⟨ãa⟩		

== Syntax ==
As in other Tuparian languages, the main clauses of Wayoró follow the cross-linguistically rare nominative–absolutive pattern. Person prefixes on the verb are absolutive, i.e., they index the sole argument of an intransitive verb (S) and the patient argument ('direct object') of a transitive verb (P). Person pronouns, which follow the verb (either cliticizing to it or not) are nominative: they may encode the sole argument of an intransitive verb (S) or the agent argument of a transitive verb (A), but not the patient of a transitive verb (P). This is exemplified below.

Eamõyãn (en).
s-V (S)
/e-amõc-a-t (ẽt)/
2-dance-TH-NFUT (2.NOM)
‘You danced.’

Etopkwap nã on.
p-V {} A
/e-top-kʷ-a-p nã õt/
2-see-PL-TH-p FUT 1.NOM
‘I’ll see you every day.’
