= Rio Omerê Indigenous Territory =

Indigenous territory in Rondônia, Brazil

Coordinates: 12.83°S 61.10°W

The Rio Omerê Indigenous Territory in Rondônia.

The Rio Omerê Indigenous Territory is an indigenous territory for isolated indigenous peoples in Rondônia, Brazil. The territory consists of 26,000 hectares of forest on the Omerê River and is home to the Kanoê and Akuntsu tribes. Both tribes were the victims of severe massacres by cattle ranchers in the 1970s and 1980s. As of 2016, the Akuntsu number just four individuals and the Rio Omerê Kanoê five. The two tribes are separate peoples speaking mutually unintelligible languages, but are linked by marriage. Several loggers and cattle ranchers also remain in the territory despite attempts to eject them and continue to pose a threat to its indigenous inhabitants.
