= Man of the Hole =

Indigenous person of Brazil (c. 1960s–2022)

- The Man of the Hole in 2018
- Born: c. 1960s
- Died: c. July 2022 (aged c. 60); Tanaru Indigenous Territory, Rondônia, Brazil
- Known for: Last member of an uncontacted people of Brazil

The Man of the Hole (Note: Portuguese: índio do buraco, lit. 'Indian of the Hole') (c. 1960s – c. July 2022), or the Tanaru Indian, (Note: Portuguese: Índio Tanaru) was an Indigenous person who lived alone in the Amazon rainforest in the Brazilian state of Rondônia. He was the sole inhabitant of the Tanaru Indigenous Territory, (Note: Named after the nearby Tanaru River, itself a hydronym from the Kanoê or Kwazá language isolates) a protected Indigenous territory demarcated by the Brazilian government in 2007.

It is not known what language the Man of the Hole spoke (although it may have been Tupian), what his people called themselves, or what his name was. He was the last surviving member of his people following their genocide by Brazilian settlers in the 1970s through 1990s and chose to remain isolated until his death in 2022. Living primarily by hunting and gathering and moving frequently, he left behind a deep hole of unknown purpose in each of his former homes, giving rise to his nickname. After surviving an attack by armed ranchers in 2009, he was found dead in his home in August 2022.

== Surviving genocide ==
The Man of the Hole was not a voluntary recluse; he was forced to live alone after his people were killed in the ongoing genocide of Indigenous peoples in Brazil. The majority of his people are believed to have been killed by settlers in the 1970s, around the same time that nearby peoples such as the Akuntsu and Kanoê experienced similar massacres. The remaining survivors, apart from the Man of the Hole, were killed in an attack by illegal miners in 1995. The Fundação Nacional do Índio (FUNAI), Brazil's government agency for Indigenous interests, later discovered the remains of their village, which had been bulldozed in 1996. They had remained isolated up until this point, so it is not known what they were called, what language they spoke, or what the Man of the Hole's name was. However, the Guaratira claim that the Man of the Hole was not the last member of his people, but rather a Guaratira survivor.

== Life in isolation ==
Location of the Tanaru Indigenous Territory, officially demarcated for the Man of the Hole in 2007, in Rondônia.

FUNAI first became aware of the Man of the Hole's isolated existence in 1996. They observed that he periodically moved his home, building straw huts for shelter. He hunted wild game, collected fruits and honey, and also planted maize and cassava. Over the years, more than 50 huts that he built were identified by FUNAI. His nickname derives from the deep hole found in each home that he abandoned. It was originally believed that these holes were used to trap animals or to hide in, but some observers have also speculated that they might have been of spiritual significance. The holes were narrow and more than 1.8 m (5 ft 11 in) deep. 14 similar holes were found in the ruined village discovered by FUNAI in 1996.

Under Brazil's constitution, Indigenous peoples have the right to lands they "traditionally occupy". In 2007, FUNAI officially demarcated 8,000 hectares (31 sq mi) of his land as a protected Indigenous territory, the Tanaru Indigenous Territory. After its establishment, FUNAI monitored him and tried to prevent intrusions into the area. Despite this, the Man of the Hole was attacked by gunmen in November 2009 but managed to survive.

Although he avoided further direct contact with others, the Man of the Hole was aware that he was monitored by outsiders. FUNAI occasionally left gifts of tools and seeds for him. According to FUNAI official Bruno Pereira, these actions "engendered a certain level of trust" between FUNAI and the Man of the Hole, though the native man generally refused to take the gifts. He sometimes signaled to observing teams to avoid pitfalls he had dug either as defense or to trap animals. Conversely, explorer Marcelo dos Santos argued that the man ultimately "didn't trust anyone because he had many traumatising experiences with non-Indigenous people". In 2018, FUNAI released a video of him in order to raise global awareness of the threats to the uncontacted peoples in Brazil. In the video, the man, who was presumed to be in his 50s at the time, appeared to be in good health.

== Death ==
On 24 August 2022, the Man of the Hole was found dead in his last home by FUNAI agent Altair José Algayer. He was found "lying down in the hammock, and ornamented [with macaw feathers] as if waiting for death". There were no signs of violence or any other disturbance before his corpse was discovered by FUNAI. It was estimated that he had died in July and was about 60 years old at the time of his death. The body was transferred to the state capital Porto Velho for autopsy, in an attempt to establish the cause of death. The man's burial, originally scheduled for 14 October, finally took place on 4 November after a court order to FUNAI to release his body. He was buried in a traditional indigenous funeral at the same location where his body had been found in August. His burial place was desecrated by farmers shortly after, leading to renewed calls for permanent protection of the land where he and his people had dwelled.

== See also ==
- Shanawdithit and Demasduit, the last members of the Beothuk people of Newfoundland and Labrador
- Ishi, the last known member of the Yahi people of California
- Squanto, the last member of the Patuxet people of Massachusetts
- Juana Maria, the last known member of the Nicoleño tribe of California
