= Mekéns language =

Endangered Tupian language of Brazil

Mekens
- Sakirabiá, Mekem
- Mequéns
- Region: Brazil
- Ethnicity: 219 Mekens/Sakurabiat (2014)
- Native speakers: 22 (2014)
- Language family: Tupian: Tuparí; Mekens
- Dialects: Sakïrabiát; Koaratira; Waratégaya †

Language codes
- ISO 639-3: skf
- Glottolog: saki1248
- ELP: Mekéns
- Linguasphere: 88-EBA-aa
- 88-GAB-a

The Mekéns language (Mekem), or Amniapé, is a highly endangered Brazilian indigenous language belonging to the Tupi language trunk, and classified as one of the five surviving languages of the Tupari sub-family. The language is spoken by approximately 25 people (ibid) in the state of Rondônia, in the Amazon region of northwestern Brazil, straddling the border with neighbouring Bolivia.

== Classification ==
The Mekéns language is a language classified under three sub-families of the large Tupian trunk. Moving downward from the Tupi trunk classification comes the Tuparic, Nuclear Tuparic, and Akuntsu-Mekens sub-families, the latter to which the Mekéns language belongs.

== Geographical distribution ==
Nowadays, the majority of Mekéns language speakers live inside the federal indigenous reservation Rio Mequens, located within the municipality of Cerejeira, in the vicinity of the Mequens river tributary. The inhabitants of the reserve refer to both their language and ethnic group as the Sakurabiat (or Sakirabiat), literally translating as "Spider-Monkey". The language is spoken by the members of this ethnic group, with a total population of 66 (as of 2003), living within the reserve.

== Subdivisions ==
Within the reserve there are four distinct, documented subgroups, namely the Sakirabiat, Guarategayet, Guaratira, and Siwkweriat groups. Although initially a term for only one dialect group, the term Sakirabiat has now become the one name which encompasses all of the subgroups. This can be attributed to a sharp decline in their population during the 20th century.

There are three groups of Mekens speakers:

- Sakïrabiát (Sakirabiá, Sakiráp)
- Koaratira (Guaratira, a.k.a. Kanoé – not the same as the Kanoé language)
- Koarategayat (Guaratégaya, Guarategaja, Warategáya) †

== Endangerment ==
In the Rio Mequens reservation today, Portuguese is spoken by everyone living within the boundaries, and has become the first language of most of the residents. Furthermore, the majority of the population is monolingual and unable to speak Mekéns fluently. Only about 23 people on the reserve are fluent, with most of these people being elders; however most of the residents are familiar with the everyday words of the language, including the names of the most common animals and plants, kinship terms, manufactured objects, and domestic utensils. Children on the reserve are not learning Mekéns, meaning the language is not being effectively transmitted from one generation to the next. This is a clear indication of a high level of language endangerment.

== History ==
According to historical sources, the Guaporé river basin has consistently been the documented location of the members of the linguistic family known as the Tupi-Tupari family. The first documented contact of Europeans with the indigenous peoples living on the right bank of the Guaporé river dates back to the 17th century. For the century that followed, the area of present-day Rondônia was heavily occupied by both Portuguese and Spanish settlers, who were disputing the boundaries of their neighbouring colonies. In the late 18th century this area was abruptly abandoned by the settlers, as the colonies were moving toward independence and the interest in enforcing colonial boundaries sharply decreased.

The area was largely empty until the mid-19th century when demand for rubber drove rubber tappers to the region and brought back a heavy occupation of the area. Although having suffered substantial losses in their population, the Sakurabiat peoples survived these periods of occupation, an outcome attributed to the isolation of the villages that stood on the right bank of the Guaporé river. Their location in the headwaters of the Guaporé River's west tributaries made them difficult to access, and likely saved the group from extinction.

According to the accounts of members of the Guaratira people, the first interactions of the Sakurabiat peoples with outsiders occurred in the early 1930s, when European-Bolivian settlers navigated the Mequens river upstream, reaching their villages. The outbreak of the Second World War greatly increased the demand for rubber and led to conflicts between the rubber tappers and the indigenous population. Their traditional lands were invaded and they were forced to yield to the rubber-tapping industry. Furthermore, epidemic diseases including measles and influenza, brought by these outsiders spread rampant, causing numerous deaths and a drop in a population numbering in the thousands (during the early 1930s and 1940s) to 64 people in 1994.

== Documentation ==
The amount of literature available on the language is very limited, and there are no pedagogical grammars written on it either. The descriptive grammar available involves the dissertation and three subsequent research papers by Ana Vilacy Galucio, a researcher who received a PhD in Linguistics from the University of Chicago in 2001, with her dissertation on the Mekéns language. She is currently a senior researcher and the Coordinator of the Human Sciences Department at the Museu Paraense Emilio Goeldi research institution in Belém, Brazil, and an invited researcher of the Traces of Contact Project at Radboud University in Nijmegen, Holland.

Her dissertation paper, titled the Morphosyntax of Mekens (Tupi), involves research and data collected through field work done at the Rio Mequens Indigenous Reservation. It includes a detailed chapter on the morphology of the language, including lexical categories, inflectional morphology, and word formation processes. There is also a detailed description of the Mekéns syntax in the subsequent chapter which includes phrasal categories, as well as noun, verb, adpositional, and adverb phrases. The final chapter of her dissertation focuses on the structure of sentences, including the declarative, imperative, and interrogative sentence structures, non-verbal predicate clauses, complex sentences, and pragmatically marked sentence structures. In 2002, Galucio wrote a subsequent paper describing the word order and constituent structure in Mekéns and, in 2006, a paper in Portuguese on the relativization of the Sakurabiat (Mekéns) language.

Also in 2006, she published a book titled Narrativas Tradicionais Sakurabiat (Traditional Sakurabiat Narratives), an illustrated bilingual story book containing 25 traditional Sakurabiat legends or tales, as well as illustrations made by children living in the reserve. Most recently, in 2011, Galucio published her paper Nominalization in the Mekens Language. In this research paper, Galucio investigates "the different morphosyntactic and semantic properties of the distinct forms of deverbal nominalizations in Mekéns", in which she tries to "uncover the typological properties of this language".

The Sakurabiat language has not yet been described in a language documentation project. However, according to an article published in Portuguese in 2013 on the Museu Goeldi website, there is currently a documentation project in the works. This article, named Dicionário Sakurabiat, states that Ana Galucio, along with her coworker Camille Cardoso Miranda, are currently working on a Mekéns-Portuguese dictionary, as a way to register and document collected data from the speakers of the language. This is a project which aims to improve the instruction, learning, and preservation of the culture of the Sakurabiat people. Furthermore, there is a subproject currently being undertaken by Alana Neves, student at the Federal University of Pará, and oriented by Galucio, which aims to organize the current Mekéns texts available into an electronic database. These projects are being done with an eye to creating a complete grammar book in the Sakurabiat language. This would establish a pedagogical grammar resource which could be used to revitalize the Mekéns language and thus protect it from extinction.

== Phonology ==
The collection of sounds which occur in Mekéns is similar to that of the other Tupian languages, including consonants from the following series: voiced and voiceless stops, fricatives, liquids, nasals and glides. There are 15 consonants in total, with 5 voiced stops, 2 voiceless stops, 1 fricative, 1 liquid, 4 nasals, and 2 glides.

Phonemic Inventory of Consonants
		labial	coronal	palatal	velar	labiovelar	glottal
nasals		m	n		ŋ	ŋʷ	
stops	voiceless	p	t		k	kʷ	(?)
stops	voiced	b	—		g	—	
fricative			s				
liquid			ɾ				
glide				j			

As for the vocalic system in Mekéns, it contains 5 vowels in total, with noted contrasts between nasal and oral vowels, as well as between short and long vowels. The following table displays these contrasts in the vowels.

Phonemic Inventory of Vowels
	Oral				Nasal			
	Short		Long		Short		Long	
High	i	ɨ	iː	ɨː	ĩ	ɨ̃	ĩː	ɨ̃ː
Mid	e	o	eː	oː	ẽ	õ	ẽː	õː
Low	a		aː		ã		ãː	

== Grammar ==
This grammar aims to give an overview of the Mekéns (Sakurabiat) language, based on the PhD dissertation of Ana Vilacy Galucio, published at the University of Chicago in 2001. The Mekéns language is a highly endangered Tupi language, spoken by 25 people, among members of the ethnic group of the same name. It is found within the boundaries of the Rio Mekéns Indigenous Reservation, located in the state of Rondônia in northwestern Brazil, along the border with Bolivia. The language belongs to the sub-category Tupari, where it is classified alongside four other languages: Tupari, Makurap, Ayuru and Akuntsu. Among the Tupari languages, vocalic phonemes have remained very constant over time. The phonemic vowel inventory in these languages is nearly identical; the phonemic inventory of consonants is very similar among them, but with slight differences. Although the four languages are not mutually intelligible, their sound correspondences are very regular, providing clear proof of their genetic relationship.

In the Mekéns language, verbs have a moderately high number of morphemes, to the point where an entire sentence may be constructed using a single verb. Nouns however do not demonstrate a complex morphological structure. With nouns there is no case marking, no agreement between them and their modifiers, and no formal marking in either the possessor or the possessee in possessive constructions which involve two nominals. The morphological process of stem alternation is achieved through affixation, in which suffixation is preferred to prefixation. The personal inflectional markers and the derivational valence changing morphemes, including causative, comitative and intransitivizer, are the only prefixes in the language. All of the other affixes employed in Mekéns are suffixes which mark number, tense-aspect-mood and category change (nominalization and verbalization).

There are two types of pronouns in Mekéns - these include personal and reflexive. Nouns and pronouns are clearly distinguished from each other, in that only nouns can occur with a personal prefix or form a phrasal unit with a preceding nominal. Pronouns may not be modified by a demonstrative, but nouns may.

Table 3: Personal Pronouns
		singular	plural
1st person	exclusive	õt	ose
1st person	inclusive	õt	kise
2nd person		ẽt	eyat
3rd person		te	teyat
3rd person	co-referential	sete	seteyat

In Mekéns, the two first person plural pronouns (the inclusive and exclusive pronouns, respectively) are formed by adding the prefixes for the first person plural inclusive "ki-" and the first person singular "o-" with the morpheme "-se". The third person and third person co-referential plural personal pronouns are formed by adding the third person singular and third person co-referential pronouns to the collective clitic "-iat".

In example 1A, the personal pronoun "õt" is found at the end of the sentence. In Example 1B, the personal third person co-referential pronoun "sete" is found in the 2nd position of the sentence.

o-iko na e-ko pa õt
1S-food VERBLZR 2S-ingest FUT I
'You will be my food, I will eat you'

poret sete pɨɨp te se-eit te kwaõt
now he/she/it burst FOC 3C-belly FOC fox
'Then it burst, the fox's belly'

Table 4: Reflexive Pronouns
		singular	plural
1st person	exclusive	õrẽp	oseẽp
1st person	inclusive	õrẽp	kiseẽp
2nd person		ẽrẽp	eyarẽp
3rd person		teẽp	teyarẽp
3rd person	co-referential	seteẽp	seteyarẽp

Reflexive pronouns in Mekéns are formed by taking the personal pronouns and adding them to the enclitic formative "-ẽp", which translates literally as "really" or "indeed". Reflexive pronouns are employed as emphatic forms, and occur in a sentence together with the verb arguments they refer to. The subject and object are the same when the reflexive pronoun is used. One may also omit either the reflexive pronoun or the personal pronoun in speech. In example 2A, the reflexive first person singular pronoun "õrẽp" is seen at the beginning of the sentence, with the 1st person singular morpheme "o" attached to the verb, and the 1st personal singular pronoun "õt" at the end. In example 2B, the personal pronoun is absent, with the 3rd person co-referential pronoun "se" beginning the sentence, and the reflexive 3rd person singular pronoun "seteẽp" at the end. In example 2C, the reflexive 2nd person pronoun is absent, with the 2nd person singular morpheme "e" attached to the verb "mi" and the 2nd person personal pronoun "ẽt" at the end.

õr=ẽp o-mi-a õt
I=really 1S-shoot/kill-THEM I
'I shot myself'

se-sereka-t sete=ẽp
3C-cut.THEM-PAST he/she=really
'He cut himself'

e-mi-a ẽt
2S-shoot/kill-THEM you
'You shot yourself'

Inflectional morphology is an integral component of the Mekéns language. The system of personal inflection involves the three word classes of nouns, adjectives, and verbs, with functions ranging from genitive and verb agreement markers to the clear distinction between the coreferential and non-coreferential third person. Verbs require a prefix to denote person. Adjectives never occur as stems on their own, rather they are always preceded by either a noun, demonstrative or person prefix. A prefix modified by an adjective stem forms a noun phrase, preceded by the prefix. In example 3, the adjective "akop" (meaning hot) is preceded by the 1st person singular morpheme "o", with the personal pronoun "õt" at the end.

o-akob=õt
1S-hot=I
'I am hot'

In Mekéns, the majority of derived words are formed by affixation, which is the most used form of word formation in the language. As is the case in most Tupian languages, derivative morphemes including causative and verbalizers are used to create specific word categories and new lexical items. Although the processes of reduplication and compounding are present in the language, neither of them occupy a central role in it. There are seven derivational affixes employed in Mekéns. Two of these are the valence changing prefixes "mo-" (simple causative) and the "sese-" (comitative causative), which occurs in intransitive verbs. The other affixes include the five word class changing morphemes: the "-ka", and "-kwa" (transitivizer), "-ap" and "-pit" (deverbals) and "e-" (intransitivizers). The simple causative prefix is attached to intransitive verbs. The two allomorphs of the morpheme are defined according to the phonological forms of the verb stem to which they attach. "Mo-" attaches to the vowel initial stems, and "õ-" to the consonant initial stems.

Most transitive and intransitive verbs can be nominalized by use of the deverbal suffix "-ap". In example 4, the nominalizer "-ap" is attached to the verb "mi" (kill) to create a noun (meaning an "arrow or gun").

mi-ap
kill-NMLZR
'arrow or gun' (lit. 'an instrument that kills')

The adjectivizer in Mekéns is employed by use of the suffix "-pit". It can attach to any of the three types of lexical verbs (transitive, intransitive or uninflectible) and creates an adjective stem. In example 5, the adjectivizer works by attaching its stem "-pit" to the verb "oetobeka" (meaning "lose") to create the adjective "lost".

o-ike otat poka-ap oetobeka-pit ar-a-t
1S-brother fire burn-NMLZR lose-ADJZR get-them-PAST
'My brother found the lost lighter'

Reduplication and compounding are the two other processes of stem formation/alteration found in Mekéns, the process of reduplication being productive with verbs, however also registered in noun formation. Reduplication takes place through the reduplication of the entire verb stem. Any verb stem may be reduplicated to indicate iterative meaning, the way in which an event is performed, or simple repetition. An example of reduplication is that of the adjective stem in the noun "paak-paak" (meaning "heron"), with the word "paak" meaning "white".

In compounding, two or more existing words are combined to form a new word. This occurs when verb and noun stems are formed, and includes cases of noun incorporation. Complex or composite words are formed through the addition of up to three lexical stems. In Example 6, the two words "kimakãy" "soil" and "yẽẽt" "ashes" are combined to produce one word "dust".

kɨmakãy-yẽẽt
soil-ashes
'dust'

=== Valency change ===
Valency change is seen in Mekéns, through affixation in word formation processes. These processes include causatives (simple and comitative), transitivizers, and intransitivizers. Valency increase is achieved through simple and comitative causative formations and through the use of transitivers; while valency decrease is achieved through the use of intransitivizers.

The simple causative increases valency and is formed by the addition of a prefix. There are two allomorphs of this morpheme - namely "mo-" and "õ-". "Mo-" is attached to verb stems beginning with a vowel, and "õ-" is attached to verb stems beginning with a consonant. If the verb stem begins with an unstressed vowel, then the vowel of the prefix fuses with this initial vowel. In causative constructions, the causative morpheme is used to indicate that a participant (the causer) in the sentence is acting upon another participant (the causee), causing the latter to perform the action stated by the predicate. In this sense, another argument is added to the verb, effectively turning intransitive verbs into transitive verbs. Through the addition of the causative morpheme, a causer is introduced into a sentence, and becomes the new argument.

Example 1A shows an intransitive verb construction, with a single verb and argument. In Example 1B, the valency of this sentence is increased through a causative construction. The morpheme "-mo" is prefixed onto the verb, with the subject "he" of the verb in part A becoming the causee "the child" in the new causative construction in part B.

se-er-a-t
3C-sleep-THEM-PAST
‘He slept’

kɨrɨt mo-er-a-t
child CAU-sleep-THEM-PAST
‘He made the child sleep’

Transitive verb constructions may also become causative constructions. Moving from Example 2 A to 2B, a transitive construction becomes a causative construction by the affixation of the causative morpheme "-õ". Here, the subject of the verb in part A becomes the causer of the verb in part B.

o-so-a-t
1S-see-THEM-PAST
'He saw me'

o-õ-so-a-t
1S-CAU-see-THEM-PAST
'He showed me (to someone)'

The comitative-causative increases valency and is formed by the addition of the prefix "-ese". This increases verb valency through the transformation of intransitive verb stems into transitive verb stems. It differs from the simple causative, because the causer not only causes the causee to perform the action stated by the predicate, but the causer also performs this action at the same time as the causee. For example, a person bringing an object to a specific location not only causes the object to arrive someplace, that person (the causer) arrives too. Important to note is that the causative comitative morpheme is different from the simple comitative; the former being a derivational affix applied to verb stems and the latter a postpositional clitic taking a noun phrase as its object. In Example 3 A, the morpheme "-ese" is added to the verb, inducing the comitative causative form.

s-ese-pɨbor-a-ra õt
3S-COM-arrive-THEM-RESUM I
'I arrived again bringing it' / 'I arrived again with it'

The transitivizer in Mekéns increases valency. It works by applying the suffix "-ka" to adjective and uninflectible verb stems, creating transitive verb stems. Moving from Example 4A to 4B, "-ka" is added to an adjective stem "perop" (beans). When the object and/or subject is unspecified or implicitly known in a sentence, uninflectible verbs are normally employed.

kobo perop
bean cooked
‘cooked beans’

kobo perop-ka-t
beans cooked-TR-past
‘he/she cooked the beans’

The second transitivizer suffix, "-kwa", is similar to "-ka", in that it creates transitive verb stems from adjective and uninflectible verb stems. However, it may also create transitive verb stems from nouns. Moving from Example 4C to 4D, the noun "pan" described by the adjective "black" is augmented by the addition of "-kwa". This allows for both the implicitly stated subject "he/she" and the object "me" to be introduced.

ŋwãẽ pɨɨk
pan black
‘black pan’

o-pɨɨk-kwa-ra
1S-black-TR+PL-RESUM
‘(He/she) completely painted me black again'

Valency decrease in Mekéns is achieved by use of the intransitivizer, and is formed by applying the intransitivizer prefix "e-" to transitive verb forms, thus creating intransitive verb stems. The addition of this prefix to the transitive verb also creates morphological causativization. In Example 5A, the noun "banana" is described by the adjective "ripe". In 5B, the instransitivizer "e-" is subsequently applied, introducing causation to the sentence, in an intransitive construction. There is only one argument in the sentence, (bananas), which is the causee, since it is receiving the action of the verb "ripe".

apara saro
banana yellow
‘Ripe banana’

se-e-saro-ka te apara
3C-INTRVZR-yellow-TR FOC banana
‘The bananas are getting ripe’

=== Plurals ===
The plural in Mekéns is achieved by attaching a morpheme to nouns, pronouns, verbs and auxiliaries. The morpheme and collective clitic "-iat" is the most commonly used plural morpheme in the language, being attached to all of the above lexical categories, except for verbs, in which case "-kwa" is attached. The morpheme "-iat" may be used to indicate plurality in either a standard or collective sense. This is to say, in the standard sense it denotes more than one object or entity belonging to the same category, and in the collective sense it denotes a number of similar or different objects or entities, which together form a common group. The latter sense is the most common of the two, as the formal category of number (i.e. plural vs. singular) is not a general distinction in Mekéns.

The morpheme "-iat" is attached to nouns, which constitute an open class and may be specified for the grammatical category of number. There is no case, class or gender marking associated with nouns. There is, however, a number distinction: nouns may be marked as either singular or plural. Singular nouns, which constitute the default case, are unmarked. Plural nouns are marked by the collective clitic "-iat". Plural marking can be omitted if it is marked in other elements in a clause, such as the verb or demonstrative. The collective or plural form in nouns is marked to the right of the noun phrase and before other clitics. When a noun is altered by one or more adjective stems, the collective marker is usually inserted to the right of the last adjective stem, after the noun (seen in examples 1A and B). It may also be inserted to the right of the first adjective stem after the noun (seen in example 1D), and may sometimes attach directly to the noun, before the adjective stems (seen in example 1E). The collective morpheme is freer than the other affixes in Mekéns, since its scope extends over more than just a single world. It is therefore appropriate to consider this collective morpheme as a Noun Phrase modifier, like the postpositional clitics in the language. Examples 1E and 1F illustrate its scope over the entire noun phrase. In part a, it refers to a group of non-Indian young boys, and in example b, it refers to the group of "non-indian black guys", and not just to the "black guys".

ŋwɑ̃ẽ poor=iat
pan old=COL
"the old pans"

ŋwɑ̃ẽ poot no=iat
pan old other=COL
"other old pans"

ŋwɑ̃ẽ no=iat poot
pan other=COL old
"other old pans"

pebo=iat paak no
wing=COL white other
"other white (bird) wings"

arẽp pagop-taɨp [kwerep pagop-taɨb=iat] {se=poroka t} õet te s-ike arop firmino pɨɨk [kwerep pɨɨg=iat]
then young-male non.indian young-male=COL 3C-die.THEM guess FOC 3S-older.brother that Firmino black non.indian black=COL
'Then he was a young guy, one of the non-indian young guys, I don't know whether he died or not, his brother, Firmino, one of the non-indian black guys.'

In the second personal plural, third personal plural and third person co-referential plural forms respectively, personal pronouns are marked by the collective clitic "-iat". Table 1 illustrates the use of the morpheme in the above forms. Note that the vowel "i" changes to "y", when suffixed to personal pronouns.

Table 1 - The Collective Clitic in Personal Pronouns
	Personal Pronoun
2nd-person plural	eyat
3rd-personal plural	teyat
3rd-person co-referential plural	seteyat

In verbs, plurality may be marked in two ways - either through the application of the plural suffix "-kwa", or through stem alteration. In example 2A, the "-kwa" suffix is attached to the verb to indicate the killing of more than one person. In stem alteration, "one verb is used for a singular argument, and a different verb is used for a plural argument". This is demonstrated in example 2B.

se-no mi-kwa pããt
3C-other kill-PL like
'He likes to kill others'

seteyat-set se-teg-õ kwa i-et
3PL-go 3C-house-DAT go/come.PL.SUBJ 3-AUX.in.motion.PL
'They left, they are going home/to their own house'

With auxiliaries, the plurality of their argument is expressed with the clitic "-iat". In examples 3A and 3B, the third personal plural is implied, although there is no indication of person after the auxiliary-plural word. When there is no marking for person in transitive verb stems, this indicates the third person. Furthermore, as seen in example 3B, when other overt plural markers are present, the third personal singular coreferential prefix takes a plural reference. In example 3C, there is no marking of person in neither the lexical verb nor the auxiliary; the person/number of the argument is indicated only by the use of morpheme "-iat", which is suffixed to the auxiliary. The sentence is therefore interpreted as having a third-person plural subject. Moving to example 3D, the sentence has a first person plural subject, seen after the "-iat" morpheme.

teyat-er-a naat tob=iat
3P-sleep-THEM ? AUX.lying=COL
'They are already sleeping'

se-er-a naat tob=iat
3C-sleep-THEM ? AUX.lying=COL
'They are already sleeping'

tɨero ma naat kob=iat
chicha make ? AUX.moving=COL
'They are making chicha’

tɨero ma naat kob=iat
chicha make ? AUX.moving=COL
'We (excl) are making chicha'
