= Tupari languages =

Tupian language branch of Brazil

Tuparí
- Geographic distribution: Brazil
- Linguistic classification: Tupian: Tuparí
- Subdivisions: Makurap; Core/Nuclear Tupari

Language codes
- Glottolog: tupa1251

The Tuparí languages of Brazil form a branch of the Tupian language family.

== Internal classification ==
The Tupari languages are:

- Tupari
  - Makuráp
  - Nuclear Tupari
    - Akuntsu–Mekéns (Sakirabiá, Waratégaya)
    - Tuparí, Kepkiriwát, Wayoró

None are spoken by more than a few hundred people.

A more recent internal classification by Nikulin & Andrade (2020) is given below:

- Tuparian
  - Makurap
  - Core Tuparian
    - Wayoró–Tuparí
      - Wayoró
      - Tuparí
    - Corumbiara
      - Mekéns
      - Akuntsú

== Varieties ==
Below is a list of Tupari language varieties listed by Loukotka (1968), including names of unattested varieties.

- Tupari
  - Macuráp group
    - Macuráp - spoken at the sources of the Colorado River (Rondônia).
    - Kanuːa / Koaratíra / Canoê - spoken in the valley of Apidía and on the middle course of the Verde River, Rondônia.
    - Amniapé - spoken at the sources of the Mequéns River.
    - Guaratégaja / Mequen - spoken at the sources of the Verde River and Mequéns River in the same region.
    - Kabishiana - spoken between the Corumbiara River and Verde River, Rondônia.
    - Wayoró / Wyarú - spoken at the sources of the Terevinto River and Colorado River (Rondônia).
    - Apichum - spoken in the same region but exact location unknown.
    - Tupari / Wakaraü - once spoken on the upper course of the Branco River or São Simão River, the same territory; now probably extinct.
  - Kepkeriwát group
    - Kepkeriwát / Quepi-quiri-uate - spoken on the right bank of the Pimenta Bueno River.

== Proto-language ==
Proto-Tupari
- Reconstruction of: Tupari languages
- Reconstructed ancestor: Proto-Tupian

Proto-Tuparí reconstructions by Moore and Vilacy Galucio (1994):

gloss	Proto-Tuparí
‘sweet potato’	*gwagwo
‘tapir’	*ɨkwaay
‘macaw’	*pet+'a
‘one’	*kiẽt
‘small’	*Dĩĩt
‘fish’	*pot
‘fowl’	*õkɨra
‘seed’	*kit
‘neck’	*gwotkɨp
‘heart’	*ãnõã
‘to know’	*toã
‘to give’	*ñũã
‘to speak’	*mãYã
‘sun, year’	*ŋgiahkop
‘stone’	*ŋwa+'i
‘earth’	*kɨy
‘fire; firewood’	*agopkap
‘mountain’	*(n)dzo
‘person’	*aotse
‘mother’	*ñä
‘husband’	*mẽt
‘hammock’	*ẽ/*ĩnĩ
‘seat’	*ãβõ-pe
‘seat’	*ñãp-pe
‘hair’	*Dap
‘tooth’	*ñããy
‘hand’	*mbo
‘nail’	*mbo-ape
‘skin’	*pe
‘liver’	*pia
‘foot’	*mbi
‘breast’	*ŋẽp
‘blood (n)’	*a
‘blood (n)’	*eYɨ
‘tobacco’	*pitoa
‘maize’	*atsitsi
‘axe’	*gwi
‘knife’	*ŋgɨtpe
‘timbo’	*ŋĩk
‘mortar’	*ẽndzɨ
‘salt’	*ŋgɨɨt
‘meat’	*ñẽt+'ã
‘water (n)’	*ɨgɨ
‘basin’	*βãẽkɨt
‘dust’	*ñõ'õ
‘path’	*pee
‘night’	*ŋĩndak
‘leaf’	*Dep/*deep
‘Brazil nut tree’	*kãnã
‘Brazil nut tree’	*arao
‘assai (palm)’	*gwit+'i
‘banana’	*ehpiip
‘cotton’	*ororo
‘genipap’	*tsigaap
‘peanut’	*araɨgwi
‘pepper’	*kõỹ
‘armadillo’	*ndayto
‘tail’	*okway
‘snake’	*Dat/*daat
‘lizard’	*Dako
‘turtle’	*mbok+'a
‘caiman’	*gwaYto
‘crab’	*kera
‘achiote’	*ŋgop
‘horn’	*apikɨp
‘paca’	*gwãnãmbiro
‘deer’	*ɨtsɨɨ
‘dog’	*ãŋwẽko
‘ocelot’	*ãŋwẽko Dĩĩt
‘agouti’	*ŋwãkɨ̃ỹã
‘bat’	*ŋwari+'a
‘coati’	*pi'it
‘capuchin monkey’	*sahkɨrap
‘spider monkey’	*ãrĩmẽ
‘honey marten’ (kinkajou?)	*ãmãnã
‘peccary’	*Daotse
‘collared peccary’	*Daotsey
‘louse’	*ãŋgɨp
‘flea’	*ñõk
‘wasp’	*ŋgap
‘termite’	*ŋgub+i
‘big ant’	*Dat+'a
‘cockroach’	*a
‘cockroach’	*eβape
‘cicada’	*ŋõtŋõna
‘scorpion’	*kɨtnĩŋã
‘snail’	*ɨ̃ỹã
‘piranha’	*ipñãỹ
‘surubim’	*ãnõrẽ
‘mandi’	*mõkoa
‘toucan’	*yo
‘toucan’	*ñõkãt
‘duck’	*ɨpek
‘vulture’	*ɨβe
‘vulture’	*ako
‘hawk’	*kẽỹ+'ã
‘hummingbird’	*mĩnĩt
‘owl’	*popoβa
‘partridge’	*kwãŋwã
‘basket, big’	*ãŋgerek
‘canoe’	*kɨp-pe
‘clothing’	*pe
‘to drink’	*ka
‘to take’	*ara
‘to blow’	*ɨβa
‘to vomit’	*ẽkẽt
‘to push’	*mõrã
‘to swim’	*tĩptĩpnã
‘to see’	*to'a
‘to see’	*-tso-
‘hot’	*ahkop
‘good’	*poat
‘new’	*pahgop
‘old’	*poot
‘name’	*Det
‘sour’	*kãỹ
‘other’	*nõõ
‘smooth’	*atsik
‘rotten’	*ãnde
‘rotten’	*ãkwĩ
‘straight’	*kɨɨt
‘distant’	*gwetsok
‘2nd person’	*ẽt

== Syntax ==
In all Tuparian languages, the main clauses follow the cross-linguistically rare nominative–absolutive pattern. Person prefixes on the verb are absolutive, i.e., they index the sole argument of an intransitive verb (S) and the patient argument ('direct object') of a transitive verb (P). Person pronouns, which follow the verb (either cliticizing to it or not) are nominative: they may encode the sole argument of an intransitive verb (S) or the agent argument of a transitive verb (A), but not the patient of a transitive verb (P). The example below is from Wayoró.

Eamõjãn (en).
/e-amõc-a-t (ẽt)/
2-dance-TH-NFUT (2.NOM)
s-V (S)
‘You danced.’

Etopkwap nã on.
/e-top-kʷ-a-p nã õt/
2-see-PL-TH-p FUT 1.NOM
p-V {} A
‘I’ll see you every day.’
