= Makurap language =

Tupian language spoken in Brazil

Makurap
- Macurapi
- Native to: Brazil
- Region: Rondônia
- Ethnicity: 130 Makurap (2007)
- Native speakers: (45 cited 1992)
- Language family: Tupian: Tuparí; Makurap

Language codes
- ISO 639-3: mpu
- Glottolog: maku1278
- ELP: Makurap
- Linguasphere: 88-GAD-aa

Makurap (Macurapi) is a Tupian language of Brazil, spoken by the Makurap people of Rondônia. Portuguese is now the primary language of the younger Makurap; older members of Indigenous peoples in the region use Makurap during 'chichada' festivals where chicha is communally consumed.

== Phonology ==
=== Consonants ===
Makurap consonants
	Labial	Alveolar	Postalveolar	Palatal	Velar
Occlusive	p	t			k
Affricate			tʃ (dʒ)		
Fricative	(β)				
Tap/Flap		ɾ			
Nasal	m	n		(ɲ)	ŋ
Approximant	w	(l)	(ɻ)	j	

Sounds /p, t, k/ are heard as voiced [b, d, ɡ] when before voiced consonants.

Sounds /p, t, tʃ, k/ are heard as unreleased [p̚, t̚, c̚, k̚] when in word-final position.

Nasal sounds /m, n, ŋ/ are heard as prenasalized stops [ᵐb, ⁿd, ᵑɡ] in syllable-initial positions in free variation.

/w/ is also heard as a fricative [β] in free variation.

/ɾ/ is also heard as liquid sounds [ɻ] and [l] in free variation.

/j/ may also be heard as an affricate [dʒ] or prenasal [ⁿdʒ] in word-initial positions, and as [ɲ] when in between nasal vowels.

=== Vowels ===
Makurap vowels
	Front		Central		Back	
	unrounded		Central		rounded	
	oral	nasal	oral	nasal	oral	nasal
Close	i	ĩ	ɨ	ɨ̃	u	ũ
Close-mid	e	ẽ		ə̃	o	õ
Open-mid	(ɛ)			ə̃		
Open			a			

/e/ may also be heard as [ɛ] in free variation.

A length distinction is lost among younger speakers. For example, the words [tsãn] 'sweet' and [tsã:n] 'cold' are homophones in modern pronunciation.
