= Kanoê =

Indigenous people of southern Rondônia, Brazil

The Kanoê (also as the Canoe, Kapixaná and Kapixanã) are an Indigenous people of southern Rondônia, Brazil, near the Bolivian border. There are two major groups of Kanoê: one residing in the region of the Guaporé River and another in the Rio Omerê Indigenous Territory. The latter consists of just five individuals following violent contact with settlers in the last few decades. The Kanoê of the Guaporé River have also had a troubled history of interaction with colonists; significantly reduced in population, they are now largely assimilated into neighbouring Indigenous and non-Indigenous peoples.

== History ==
The first contact of the Kanoê people with foreigners brought a lot of death through sickness. Many of the people died of pertussis, measles, and stomach problems. There was also death due to conflicts with the farmers settling in the area. The Kanoê people can be found in two main areas, the banks of the Guaporé River and the Omerê River. Their traditional territories, particularly Rio Omeré Indigenous Territory, are located in Corumbiara and Chupinguaia municipalities of Rondônia state. The main population, living by Guaporé River, share the land with other indigenous people and have a long history of cohabitation with the "white man". Most of them have been assimilated into mainstream Brazilian society and are married to people belonging to other indigenous groups. Only three of them still speak the Kanoê language today.

By the Omerê River, a single family of Kanoê can be found, with much less influence from the Brazilian society. Having fled into a forest reserve, this group is considered an isolated indigenous people, only allowing outside contact in 1995 after many years of attempts by the Ethno Environmental Protection Front. As of 2025, only four people remained of this Kanoê family: Txinamãty, her brother Purá, her son Bukwá and Purá's newborn boy. The area by the Omerê River is believed to be the original territory of the Kanoê people by Victor Dequech (1942) and Etta Becker-Donner (1955).

== Language ==
The Kanoê language is an almost extinct language isolate.

== See also ==
- Genocide of Indigenous peoples in Brazil
- Man of the Hole
