= Corumbiara =

Municipality in Rondônia, Brazil

- Municipality
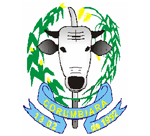
- Flag Coat of arms

- Location in Rondônia state

- Location in Brazil
- Coordinates: 12°57′43″S 60°52′12″W
- Country: Brazil
- Region: North
- State: Rondônia

Area
  - Total: 3,060 km^{2} (1,180 sq mi)

Population (2020)
  - Total: 7,220
  - Density: 2.36/km^{2} (6.11/sq mi)
- Time zone: UTC−4 (AMT)

Corumbiara is a municipality located in the Brazilian state of Rondônia. Its population in 2020 was 7,220 and its area is 3,060 km^{2}. It was the site of the Corumbiara massacre.

== See also ==
- List of municipalities in Rondônia
