= Tupari language =

Tupian language of northwestern Brazil

Tuparí
- Native to: Brazil
- Region: Rio Branco, Rondônia
- Ethnicity: Tupari
- Native speakers: 340 (2006) more suspected upriver
- Language family: Tupian: Tuparí languages; Tuparí

Language codes
- ISO 639-3: tpr
- Glottolog: tupa1250
- ELP: Tuparí
- Linguasphere: 88-GAA-aa

Tuparí is an indigenous language of Brazil. It is one of six Tupari languages of the Tupian language family. The Tuparí language, and its people, is located predominantly within the state of Rondônia, though speakers are also present in the state of Acre on the Terra Indıgena Rio Branco. There are roughly 350 speakers of this language, with the total number of members of this ethnic group being around 600.

== History ==
Rondônia, like many others, was once strictly belonging to indigenous people of Brazil. The large-scale colonization of Rondônia happened only in the second half of the 20th century. At this time many people died from the introduction of preventable diseases to which they were not immune, and as a result, in the 1950s the Tuparí people were nearly wiped out entirely by measles. According to Caspar (1956), there were only 67 survivors of these epidemics, who were then forced to work for slave wages. The group eventually recovered and increased in their numbers. Now population growth is no longer an issue due to their large family sizes. However, their language is only spoken by approximately 350 people on the two main reserves (Rio Branco and Rio Guaporé). The cultural and linguistic situation varies by village, with some partaking in trans-generational linguistic transmission and others adopting Portuguese.

== Current status ==
Regarding the vitality of the language, the number of speakers indicate that this language is critically endangered, at moribund levels, rating an (8A) on the Ethnologue scale. This has to do with many factors, including the fact that in some communities, for example those living on the Terra Indígena Rio Guaporé, intergenerational transmission has ceased entirely due to a complete shift to Portuguese.

== Documentation ==
=== Existing literature ===
Tuparí is documented in the literature to some extent, with most publications being in Portuguese and English. It has also been discussed in German.

Major contributions to the literature include that of Franz Caspar, mentioned above, who wrote extensively from an ethnographic point of view in the mid 20th century. Several linguists have also produced materials on the Tuparí language. Poliana Alves has written on the phonology of the language (Alves, 1991) and has produced a bilingual dictionary (Alves, 2004). Aryon Dall'Igna Rodrigues collaborated with Franz Caspar to publish a sketch of the grammar (Rodrigues and Caspar, 2017). Lucy Seki, in 2001, wrote about the morphosyntax of nouns in Tuparí (Seki, 2001). In 2018, Adam Roth Singerman produced an extensive description and analysis of Tuparí for his PhD dissertation at the University of Chicago, focusing on the morphosyntax of the language (Singerman, 2018). As well, Singerman also worked to create a literacy workbook, Wan Tupari Ema’en Nika! (Tupari et al., 2016) to help boost vitality. His work adds information about the syntax and expression of evidentiality in Tuparí as hadn't been covered in previous research. In regards to non-linguistic references, there are Tuparí stories, written in Portuguese, as part of anthropologist Betty Mindlin's collection of indigenous myths (Mindlin, 1993).

Other major contributions to the literature on Tuparí include Monserrat (2000), Galucio (1993, 2011), and Moore (1994).

=== Caspar and Singerman ===
Linguistically, the description of Tuparí was lacking prior to the publication of Singerman's dissertation in 2018, especially compared to others within its linguistic family and region. However, Tuparí was one of the first languages and cultures of Rondônia studied in detail. This research was due to the Swiss ethnographer and explorer, Franz Caspar, who took many field-notes in the 1940s and the 1950s, as he lived within the community. He is known in Tuparí as Toto Amsi Tàn (the long-nosed grandfather). Caspar's notes were passed on to Aryon Dall’Igna Rodrigues, a Brazilian linguist who wrote his dissertation in German on Tupinambá at the University of Hamburg. He wrote an eighty-paged description on Tuparí based on Caspar's notes, however it was never published. It is believed to be because, while he had come up with a description of the language, he had never done any fieldwork in the community himself. This was enough for him to deem that Caspar, being an anthropologist, could potentially have some linguistic errors within his field-notes and documentations. Even though the description of the Tuparí language prior to that done by Singerman was fairly limited, the cultural documentation was among the best in the region. With that being said, the Tuparí people are also currently experiencing a loss of that culture through a language shift, due to the overwhelming modern pressure for them to switch to Portuguese.

== Phonology ==
=== Consonants ===
Consonants
		Labial	Alveolar	Palatal	Velar	Glottal
Nasal		m	n			
Plosive/ Affricate	voiceless	p	t	tʃ	k	ʔ
Plosive/ Affricate	voiced	b		dʒ	g	ʔ
Fricative			s	ʃ		h
Liquid			ɾ			
Glide		w		j		

=== Vowels ===
Oral vowels
	Front	Central	Round
High	i	ʉ	
Mid	e		o
Low		a	

== Morphology ==
Tuparí has a complex morphology and morpho-syntactic system, including a nominal domain with morphologically marked aspects, as well as verbal morphology. It also has evidentiality marking in past tense clauses, discussed below. In addition to strong pronouns, weak nominative enclitics and proclitic pronouns, the nominal domain is morphologically marked for possession and case. NPs are also able to undergo internal modification, and number marking can be seen on pronominals. Numerically bare NPs have interpretive flexibility and can be read as plural despite a lack of plural morphology. In verbal morphology, verbalizing is evident in this language, and follows strict ordering restrictions. Affixes can attach to the left or right side of a lexical morpheme, although this does not happen arbitrarily. Other main aspects of verbal morphology in Tuparí are deverbalizing morphology, which turn verbs into other categories such as nouns, valency-manipulating prefixes, discussed below, reduplication of verbal roots, adverbial prefixes and noun incorporation to modify timing and manner, and suffixal morphology with a hierarchy of positions.

strong pronouns
		Root	Root + nuclear case	Root + oblique case
1st person	singular	on	orẽn	orẽrẽ
1st person	exclusive	ote	otet	oterè
1st person	inclusive	kit	kiret	kirere
2nd person	singular	en	erẽn	erẽrẽ
2nd person	plural	wat	waret	warere

Examples of speakers using strong pronouns:

Otero’om ’on.
o-tet-ro-’om ’on
1SG-go.SG-NMZ_{ro}-NEG 1SG
‘I have not gone there.’

Wapsitkara ’on ẽrõ, ma’a ’en herõwap hem.
w-apsitkat-a ’on en-o, ∅-ma’ẽ-a ’en herõwap hem
1SG-think-TH 1SG 2SG-INS [3-speak-TH 2SG yesterday] HÈ.INS
‘I thought about you, about the thing that you said yesterday.’

weak enclitics
		singular	dual	plural
1st person	exclusive	’on	’ote	’ote
1st person	inclusive	’on	’okit	’okitwat
2nd person		’en	wat	wat
3rd person		e~∅	e~∅	e~∅

Examples of weak nominative enclitics:

Watoa ko ’on irik’enerõpe.
w-ato-a ko ’on irik’e-nẽ-ro-pe
1SG-bathe-TH POLITE.FUT 1SG work-VBZ_{nẽ}-NMZ_{ro}-LOC
‘Let me bathe before working.’ / ‘I am going to bathe before working.’

Oteatoa ko ’ote.
ote-ato-a ko ’ote
1PL.EXCL-bathe-TH POLITE.FUT 1PL.EXCL
‘We-EXCL should bathe.’ / ‘Let us-EXCL bathe.’ / ‘We-EXCL ought to bathe.’

Teop nẽkare, {} aramirã ’ero’are.
te-op nẽkat e aramirã ’ero’are
3C-father resemblance 3 [woman while.SG]
‘She resembles her father, even though she’s a girl.’

proclitic pronouns
		singular	plural
1st person	exclusive	o-/w-	ote-
1st person	inclusive	o-/w-	ki-
2nd person		e-	wat-
3rd person		i-~y-~s-~∅-	i-~y-~s-~∅-
3rd person	coreferential	te-	te-

proclitic paradigm with the word ek 'house'
		singular	plural
1st person	exclusive	wek	otek’
1st person	inclusive	wek	kiek
2nd person		ek	wat hek
3rd person		iek	iek
3rd person	coreferential	tek	tek

=== Valency manipulation ===
Valency manipulation refers to the grammar's ability to manipulate how many and what kind of arguments a verb can take. The Tuparí language uses four prefixes for this, causative m- /õ-, comitative-causative ete- /ite-, intransitivizing e-, and reciprocal e-. The causative morpheme makes the subject of an intransitive verb the object of a transitive verb. The distribution is limited to mostly unaccusatives and verbs of the semantic classes of verbs of motion, nonvolitional states or changes in state, and some verbs of thought or emotion. There are a few transitives that can take this morpheme. The comitative-causative morpheme promotes an intransitive subject to a transitive subject by introducing a new direct object. This morpheme requires that both the subject and the object are undergoing the acting together (i.e. coming). Singerman reports that his consultant approved the morpheme on a wide range of verbs of motion. It may also attach to some auxiliaries to express temporary possession. The intransitivizing morpheme e- is attested on a few intransitive verbs derived from unmarked transitive base. Common examples are the verb 'command' transforming to 'speak', 'kill' transforming to 'die'. Intransitives derived with e- may also interact with other valency changing morphemes, such as causativization. Lastly is the reciprocal eue-. This morpheme can only occur on transitive roots. It requires plural subjects to be acting upon each other, i.e. fighting each other. Another notable feature is that the reciprocal can combine with other valency morphemes indicating that it probably occupies a position further left. This is further evidenced by the fact that it does not always fall under the domain of reduplication.

Eõ’era ’on.
e-õ-’et-a ’on
2SG-CAUS-sleep-TH 1SG
‘I made you sleep / put you to bed.’

Sitèsa ’on.
s-ite-s-a ’on
3-COM-come.SG-TH 1SG
‘I brought it.’

=== Evidentiality ===
Grammaticalized evidentiality (marking of the source of information) is functional, rather than lexical, and thus is morphologically expressed in a grammatical manner, rather than as an adverbial. Additionally, it has semantic characteristics. It is typically marked in Tupí languages by free particles rather than by bound morphemes, however in Tuparí, evidentiality is marked by a bound verbal suffix. This suffix agrees in number with the subject of the verb, and is required on a clausal level. In Tuparí, only past tense contexts mark a difference in witnessed and unwitnessed utterances, and evidentiality must be marked in these contexts. The sole purpose of the -pnẽ/ -psira morphemes is to mark this difference of witnessing. Evidential markers in Tuparí can easily be considered separately from epistemic markers since their strict syntactic positioning and clausal organization mean that they can only mark sources of evidence, and not other elements such as speaker attitude. They also must be marked in every clause, for example:

Mõket kut kire’õerẽ, kiakoet koepa eanã kirenã soro’epsira.
mõket kut kire-’om-ere kiakop-et koepa eanã kire-nẽ-a s-oro’e-psira
long.ago ANCIENT.PAST person-NEG-OBL sun-NUC moon together.with person-VBZ_{nẽ}-TH 3-AUX_{go}.PAUC-EV.PL
‘Long ago, when there were no other people, the sun and the moon were people (NONWITNESSED).’

There are six allomorphs of the evidential suffix in Tuparí, as seen in the table below:

	After Oral Vowel	After Nasal Vowel	After Consonant
singular	-pnẽ	-mnẽ	-nẽ
plural	-psira	-msira	-sira

The evidential marker in Tuparí always attaches to the highest verbal head. For example:

Teaoroynaẽ. {}
te-aoros-nẽ-a e
3C-arrive.SG-EV.SG-TH 3
‘He/she arrived (NON-WITNESSED).’

In this case, since there is no auxiliary present, it attaches to the lexical verb 'arrive'.

Due to always agreeing with sentential subjects, -pnẽ only works with singular subjects and -psira only with plural ones.

Example: (345) Evidential marking on the lexical verb ‘come’:

te- + s + {} → tèynẽ
3C {} come.SG {} EV {} {}

te- + ã’ẽ + {} → teã’emsira
3C {} come.PAUC {} EV {} {}

te- + ip’anẽ + {} → teip’anemsira
3C {} come.PL {} EV {} {}

The variations depend on whether the lexical verb distinguishes between singular, plural and paucal (two), or just between singular and plural.

== Syntax ==
=== Cases ===
Tuparí has four cases, as seen in the table below. Note that Nuclear and Locative cases can be stacked.

Grammatical case
Form of Case Suffix	Case Suffix in Nasal Contexts	Gloss
-et/ -t	-en/ -n	NUC (nuclear)
-pe	-pe	LOC (locative)
-m/ -o	-m/ -õ	INS (instrumental-lative)
-ere/ -re	-ẽrẽ/ -rẽ	OBL (oblique)
-etpe/ -tpe	-enpe/ -npe	NUC+LOC (nuclear + locative)

As demonstrated in the table above, there are four case types in Tuparí: nuclear, locative, instrumental-lative, and oblique. Additionally, under certain conditions, Nuclear and Locative cases are able to stack (for reasons that will be discussed below). As mentioned by Singerman (2018), the case markings are used in complementary distribution, unless they are referring to time, in which case LOC (on Portuguese loan-words), INS (on Tuparí temporal expressions) and OBL (in finite embedded clauses marking time) may be used.

==== Nuclear case ====
As discussed by Singerman (2018, section 2.4), the nuclear case is subject to strict grammatical constraints. It is required on all NP subjects, as well as on strong pronouns that introduce a new topic.

An example of NUC case-marking on an NP subject:

Eowet ke tewakto pete’a.
e-op-et ke te-wak-to pete’a
2SG-father-NUC like.this 3C-cry-NMZ_{ro} FUT.3SG+TH
‘Your father will cry like this.’

NUC case marking is optional for non-pronominal direct objects, and is barred from appearing on clause-initial foci and incorporated direct objects. The three cases in which nonpronominal direct objects do not bear a NUC case-marking are as follows: direct objects that have not previously been mentioned in the discourse, genitive possessors (never marked) and nominal predicates. Regarding direct objects, while the first mention of the object in the discourse will be bare of case-marking, subsequent mentions of the same object will bear case marking. Direct objects will also tend to not be case-marked when following a negation or negative element in the sentence. Weak nominative enclitics do not bear any case morphology.

Incorporated objects do not bear Nuclear Case:

Opẽan’aropmã ko ’on.
o-pẽan-arop-mã-a ko ’on
1SG-first-food-put-TH POLITE.FUT 1SG
‘Let me put my food [on my plate] first.’

===== Possessors =====
Possessors in Tuparí are always unmarked for case, thus demonstrating that the language has no overt Genitive case. To account for case never being marked for incorporated direct objects and clause-initial foci, and sometimes being marked for unincorporated direct objects, it has been posited by Fery and Isihara (2016) and Krifka and Musan (2012), among others, that Tuparí has a givenness or topicality condition, notably that case marking does not appear when the object is introduced, but does appear on later mentions of that object throughout the discourse. This accounts for the ban of suffixes on focal clause-initial NPs, as well as the variability as to whether unincorporated objects will bear case marking. This also highlights that nuclear case is sensitive to information structural considerations, due to these notions of focus, givenness and topicality.

An example of the lack of Nuclear case on Focal NPs:

Òwet Tupari.
o-op-et Tupari(*-t)
1SG-father-NUC Tuparí(*-NUC)
‘My father is Tuparí.’

Òpbe {} Tuparit.
o-op(*-et) e Tupari-t
1SG-father(*-NUC) 3 Tuparí-NUC
‘It is my father who is Tuparí.’ / ‘My father is the one who is Tuparí.’

==== Locative case ====
The locative case-marker -pe is used to mark location, particularly when it is inside a structure or object. It can be used in time expressions when combined with Portuguese loanwords depicting time, but is not seen in combination with time expressions in Tuparí. The -pe morpheme can also attach to VPs to change the meaning of the verb to mean “after doing X”.

example of Locative –pe:

Het’aere nẽ èkpe kiret haytoe? {}
het’aere nẽ e-ek-pe kire-t hayto e
where.you.are Y/N 2SG-house-LOC person-NUC a.lot 3
‘Are there a lot of people where you are, in your house?’

==== Instrumental – locative case ====
The instrumental-lative case marker has two meanings, notably that it demonstrates the instrument used to perform an action, or it can highlight a person or object that is physically involved in an action. Additionally, this morpheme can express the direction in which movement happens. Singerman (2018) notes that this INS morpheme is also used in Tuparí when expressing languages, since they are considered an instrument of communication.

Kat’aro ’en èurap?
kat’at-o ’en e-eut-ap
what-INS 2SG 2SG-get.full-ADV.FOC
‘What did you fill up on?’

==== Oblique case ====
The final case-marker in Tuparí is -ere/ -re, which is used to mark oblique (OBL) case. Oblique case different from Locative case in that it marks the location of a place, or the movement from a place. It can also be used in certain temporal relations, as previously mentioned. Many intransitive verbs in Tuparí can take optional complements that bear oblique case-marking. This case-marker is often also seen stacked on top of the deverbalizing nominalizer -ap.

Here Koloradore otero’apbi’a ’on Pedro yare.
here Kolorado-re o-tero’a-pbi’a ’on Pedro yare
then Colorado-OBL 1SG-AUX_{go}.SG.TH-NMZ_{ap}-DUR 1SG Pedro alongside/with
‘Back then, I was living in Colorado, with Pedro.’

==== Nuclear + locative case stacking ====
A feature of the syntax of Tuparí is that case can be stacked in certain contexts, meaning that two case features can be overtly recognized on a single nominal base. On certain NPs (rightperipheral) the Locative -pe case morpheme can be stacked onto the Nuclear case marker -et/ -t. This is part of a broader tendency in Tuparí to build “new” cases by working with the four preexisting ones. Caspar and Rodrigues (1957) and Alves (2004) have referred to the combination of Nuclear and Locative cases in Tuparí as a form of Accusative case, however Singerman (2018) challenges this, saying that the combination should rather be seen as a method to assert coreference in the discourse.

Iyma’ẽka ko ’on hètpe!
i-yma’ẽk-a ko ’on hè-t-pe
3-speak.with-TH POLITE.FUT 1SG that.thing-NUC-LOC
‘I want to talk to him, to that one!’

== Semantics ==
Singerman 2018 says that “there is little to no quantification within noun phrases”. There is little adjectival modification, and nouns do not take any articles to mark definiteness. Instead, quantification is affixed onto the verb in the form of two morphemes erote- and urut-, meaning ‘All, entirely’ and ‘two, both’ respectively. Note that erote- changes to irote- after 3rd person proclitic s-.

Amẽkòt kiparorot erotetãramka nã tero’a, saraerem e’awa tero’a te’a.
Amẽko-t ki-paroro-t erote-tãramka-a nã tero’a, saraerem e’awa-a tero’e-a te-’a
jaguar-NUC 1PL.INCL-armadillo-NUC all-kill.PL-TH PROG AUX_{go}.SG.TH everyday hunt-TH AUX_{go}.SG-TH 3C-when.SG
‘The Jaguar is killing all of our armadillos when it’s out hunting everyday.’

As seen above, when erote- combines with a direct object, the direct object NP must have nuclear case. Definiteness/specificity seems to come from the presence of the nuclear case on the direct object, which allows erote- ‘all’, which is generally only compatible with definite/specific objects. Singerman's consultants would not accept erote- combining with any caseless objects.

Korakorat terote’etãramka.
korakora-t te-erote-e-tãramka-a
chicken-NUC 3C-all-INTRNS-kill.PL-TH
‘The chickens have all died.’

Werotepuop’orap kot’oa nã otero’e, wat’ema’erẽ.
w-erote-puop’ot-ap kot’oy-a nã o-tero’e wat-ema’ẽ-re
1SG-all-learn-NMZ_{ap} want-TH PROG 1SG-AUX_{go}.SG 2PL-language-OBL
‘I am wanting to learn all of your-PL words/all of your-PL languages.’

Singerman explains that the first person singular is not compatible with an ‘all’ reading, which is why erote- instead quantifies ‘your languages-OBL’. These two examples show that it is possible for the erote- to quantify either intransitive subjects or an oblique NP, however there is a gap in the data for what happens if both the intransitive subject and oblique object are compatible with erote-.

The previously mentioned urut- has been confirmed to exist in elicitation, however there are no examples from everyday conversation or text. It is likely derived from the noun huru 'pair' but beyond that no data or analysis is offered. No other forms of quantification are discussed by Singerman.
