= Rondônia =

State in Brazil

- State
- Flag Coat of arms
- Anthem: Hino de Rondônia
- Location in Brazil
- Coordinates: 10.90°S 62.76°W
- Country: Brazil
- Region: North
- Capital and largest city: Porto Velho

Government
  - Type: Unitary state
  - Governor: Marcos Rocha (PSD)
  - Vice Governor: Sérgio Gonçalves (UNIÃO)
  - Senators: Confúcio Moura (MDB); Jaime Bagattoli (PL); Marcos Rogério (PL)
  - Legislature: Legislative Assembly of Rondônia

Area
  - Total: 237,754.172 km^{2} (91,797.399 sq mi)
  - Rank: 13th

Population (2022)
  - Total: 1,581,196
  - Rank: 23rd
  - Density: 6.650550/km^{2} (17.22485/sq mi)
  - Rank: 19th
- Demonym: Rondoniano(a) or Rondoniense

GDP (2024)
  - Total: R$84.98 billion (US$15.769 billion)

HDI
  - Year: 2024
  - Category: 0.786 – high (13th)
- Time zone: UTC−4 (BRT–1)
- Postal Code: 76800-000 to 76999-000
- ISO 3166 code: BR-RO
- Website: rondonia.ro.gov.br/portal/

Rondônia (English: /rɒnˈdoʊniə/, ron-DOHN-ee-ə; Brazilian Portuguese: [ʁõˈdõnjɐ]) is one of the 26 states of Brazil, located in the North Region (the central-western part). It is bordered by Acre in the west, Amazonas in the north, Mato Grosso in the east, and Bolivia in the south. Rondônia has a population of 1,815,000 as of 2021. It is the fifth least populated state. Its capital and largest city is Porto Velho, bathed by the Madeira River. The state was named after Cândido Rondon, who explored the north of the country during the 1910s. The state, which is home to c. 0.7% of the Brazilian population, is responsible for c. 0.3% of the Brazilian GDP.

The state has 52 municipalities and occupies an area of 237,590.547 km^{2}, equivalent to the territory of Romania and almost five times larger than Slovakia or the Dominican Republic. In addition to this, there are other important cities such as Ariquemes, Cacoal, Guajará-Mirim, Ji-Paraná, Rolim de Moura and Vilhena.

== Geography ==
Köppen map for Rondônia

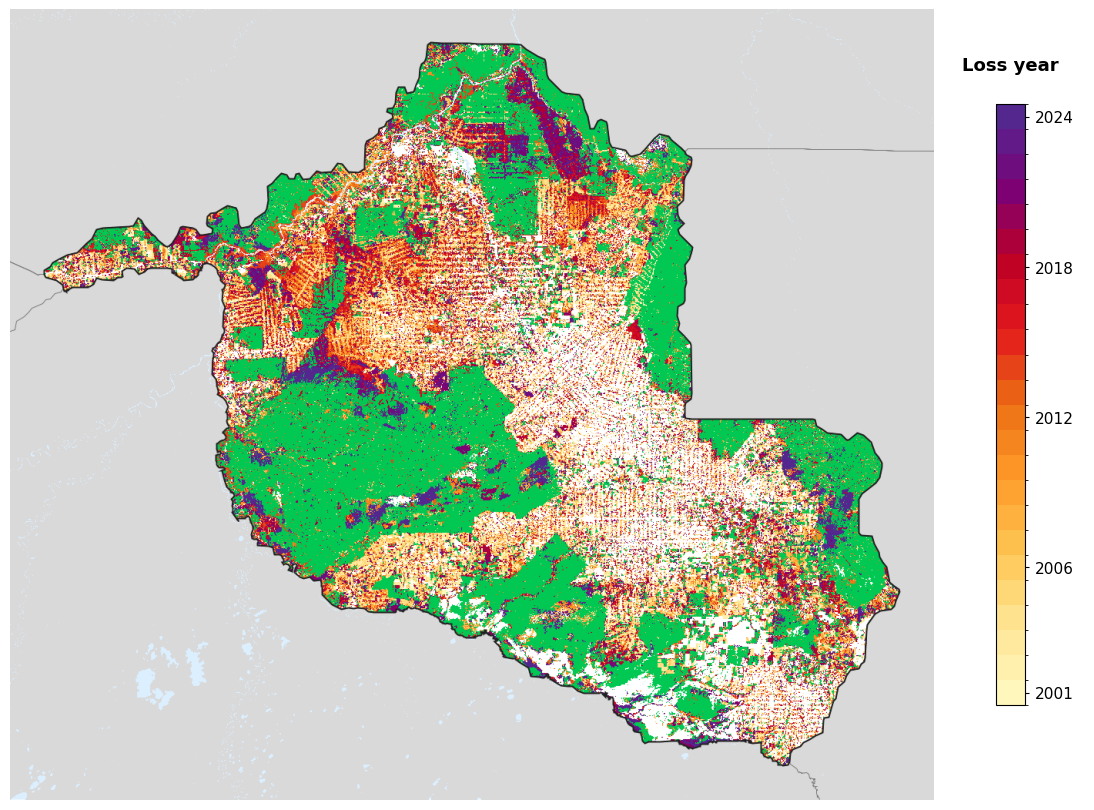
Tree-cover loss year in Rondônia, 2001-2024, from the Global Forest Change dataset.

Rondônia used to be home to over 200,000 km^{2} of rainforest, but has become one of the most deforested places in the Amazon. By 2003 around 70,000 km^{2} of rainforest had been cleared.

The area around the Guaporé River is part of the Beni savanna ecoregion.

The Samuel Dam is located in the state, on the Jamari River.

== History ==
=== Pre-colonial ===
Before the Portuguese discovery of Brazil, the region where the present state of Rondônia is situated was populated by indigenous peoples, who are known to have included the following:

==== Arawan speaking peoples ====
- Aruás (Arawá language)

==== Chapacuran speaking peoples ====
- Oro-uins (Oro Win language)

==== Macro-Je speaking peoples ====
- Jabutis (Djeoromitxí language)

==== Nambikwaran speaking peoples ====
- Nambikwara (Nambikwara language)

==== Panoan speaking peoples ====
- Kaxarari (Kasharari language)
- Karipuna (Karipuna language (Jau-Navo))

==== Tupian speaking peoples ====
It is generally accepted by linguists that the area of modern Rondônia is the origin of the Tupian languages.

- Cinta Larga (Cinta Larga language)
- Gavião (Gavião language of Jiparaná)
- Paiter (Surui language)
- Amondauas (Kagwahiva language)
- Macurap (Makurap language)
- Sakurabiat (Mekéns language)
- Caritianas (Karitiâna language)
- Araras-caros (Ramarama language)

==== Peoples speaking language isolates ====
- Kanoê (Kanoê language)
- Kwazá (Kwazá language)

=== Colonial period ===
The Spaniard Ñuflo de Chávez was the first European explorer to reach the valley of the Guaporé River between 1541 and 1542, although he only passed through. Bandeirantes arrived in the region around 1650, with the goal of exploiting the gold and other minerals of the territory. In the same period, Jesuit priests came to the region and founded the first village.

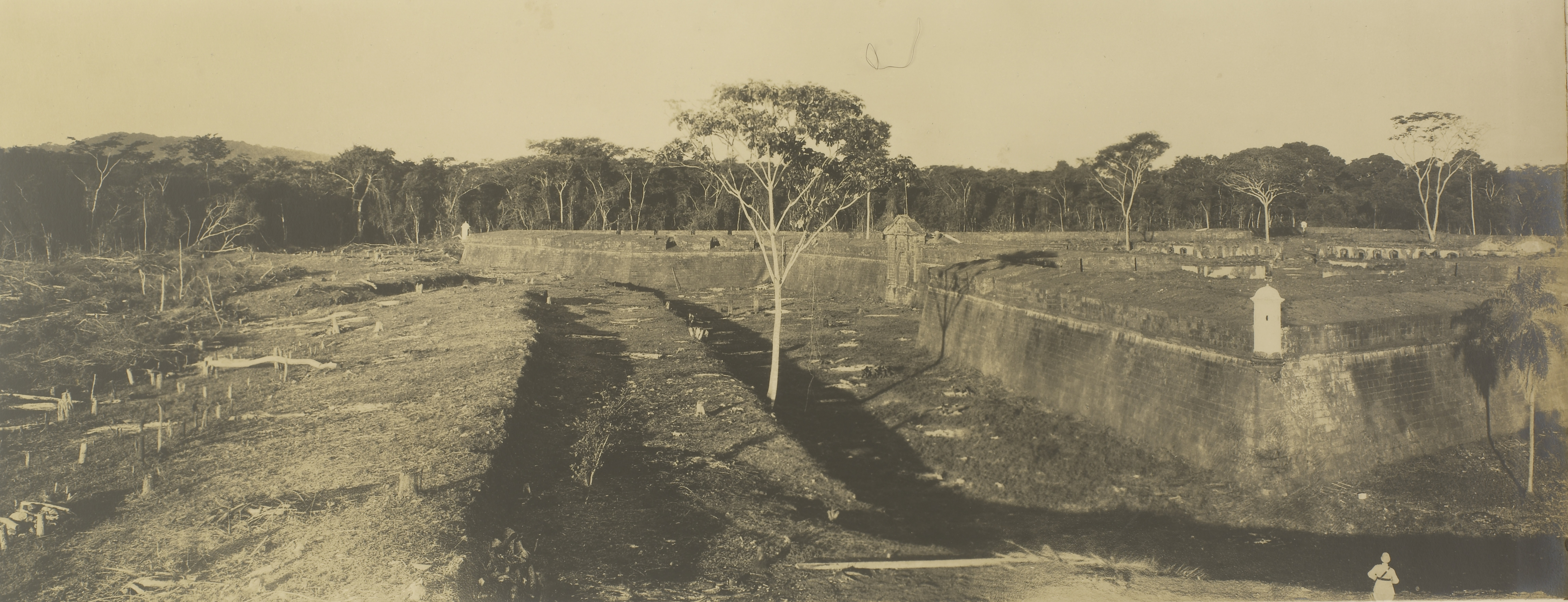
Forte do Príncipe da Beira, 1930.

As a consequence of the discovery of gold on the right bank of the Guaporé River, the Portuguese Crown founded the Captaincy of Mato Grosso in 1748 with Antonio Rolim de Moura Tavares as governor. On March 19, 1752, the governor designated Vila Bela da Santíssima Trindade as the capital, from where he commanded the border demarcation following the Treaty of Madrid (1750). In 1753, he installed a surveillance post in the village of Santa Rosa Velha, built by the Spanish on the right bank of the Guaporé, and thus in Brazilian lands. In 1759, the Spanish governor of Santa Cruz de la Sierra requested that the post be evacuated. Instead, Rolim de Moura built a fort to replace it, which became known as the Presídio de Nossa Senhora da Conceição. Due to the climate and the incursions of the Spanish, the Presidio was soon in ruins. It was rebuilt in 1769 by Governor Luís Pinto de Sousa Coutinho, and renamed as Forte de Bragança. Ruined again, in 1776 the Forte Príncipe da Beira was built in its place. In 1772, Francisco de Melo Palheta led an expedition from Belém which reached the Madeira River, the Mamoré River and the Guaporé River, reaching Santa Cruz de la Sierra. The decline of mining and the proclamation of the First Brazilian Republic caused the region to lose its economic importance until the end of the nineteenth century, when the exploitation of rubber entered its peak.

=== Postcolonial history ===
Rondônia's initial development was not driven by an official action by the Brazilian government. Rondônia was populated and integrated into the country thanks to the private initiative that was interested in the neighboring state of Acre, that was, at the time, at its economic peak, caused by the Amazon rubber boom. The clearing of the two contiguous areas in the 19th century is the result of the same expansion movement, the last in Brazil's territorial development cycle.

The definitive establishment of the former territory of Acre, in 1903, gave impetus to the development of the region of what is today Rondônia, as the Treaty of Petrópolis obliged Brazil to build the Madeira-Mamoré railway.

Decree-Law No. 5812 (13 of September 1943) established the Federal Territory of Guaporé was created from parts of the states of Amazonas and Mato Grosso. By the law of February 17, 1956, the region became known as the Federal Territory of Rondônia, in honor of Marshal Cândido Rondon. The exploitation of brazil nuts and rubber was the main economic activity until the discovery of cassiterite deposits, which accelerated the development and settlement of the region. In the 70s and 80s, tax incentives for private enterprises, federal government investments, as well as highway construction projects, the establishment of colonization centers and the easy access to good, cheap land stimulated migration, largely of peoples originating from the Center-South Region of Brazil. This development led to the territory achieving the status of a state in 1982, with 13 constituent municipalities, including the capital, Porto Velho. These are: Guajará-Mirim, Ji-Paraná, Vilhena, Ariquemes, Jaru, Pimenta Bueno, Colorado do Oeste, Cacoal, Ouro Preto do Oeste, Presidente Médici, Espigão d'Oeste and Costa Marques.

== Demographics ==
Historical population
Year	Pop.	±%
1950	36,935	—
1960	70,783	+91.6%
1970	116,620	+64.8%
1980	503,125	+331.4%
1991	1,130,874	+124.8%
2000	1,380,952	+22.1%
2010	1,562,409	+13.1%
2022	1,581,196	+1.2%

It is the third most populous state in the North Region with 1,815,278 inhabitants, according to an estimate by IBGE for 2021, being surpassed only by Pará and Amazonas. The population density was 6.6 inhabitants/km^{2}.

Urbanization: 66.8% (2004); Population growth: 2.2% (1991–2000); Houses: 430,747 (2005). Four of its municipalities have a population above 100,000 inhabitants, these being Porto Velho, Ji-Paraná, Ariquemes and Vilhena.

The 2022 census revealed the following numbers: 936,708 Brown (Multiracial) people (59.2%), 486,123 White people (30.7%), 136,793 Black people (8.7%), 17,278 Amerindian people (1.1%), 4,257 Asian people (0.3%).

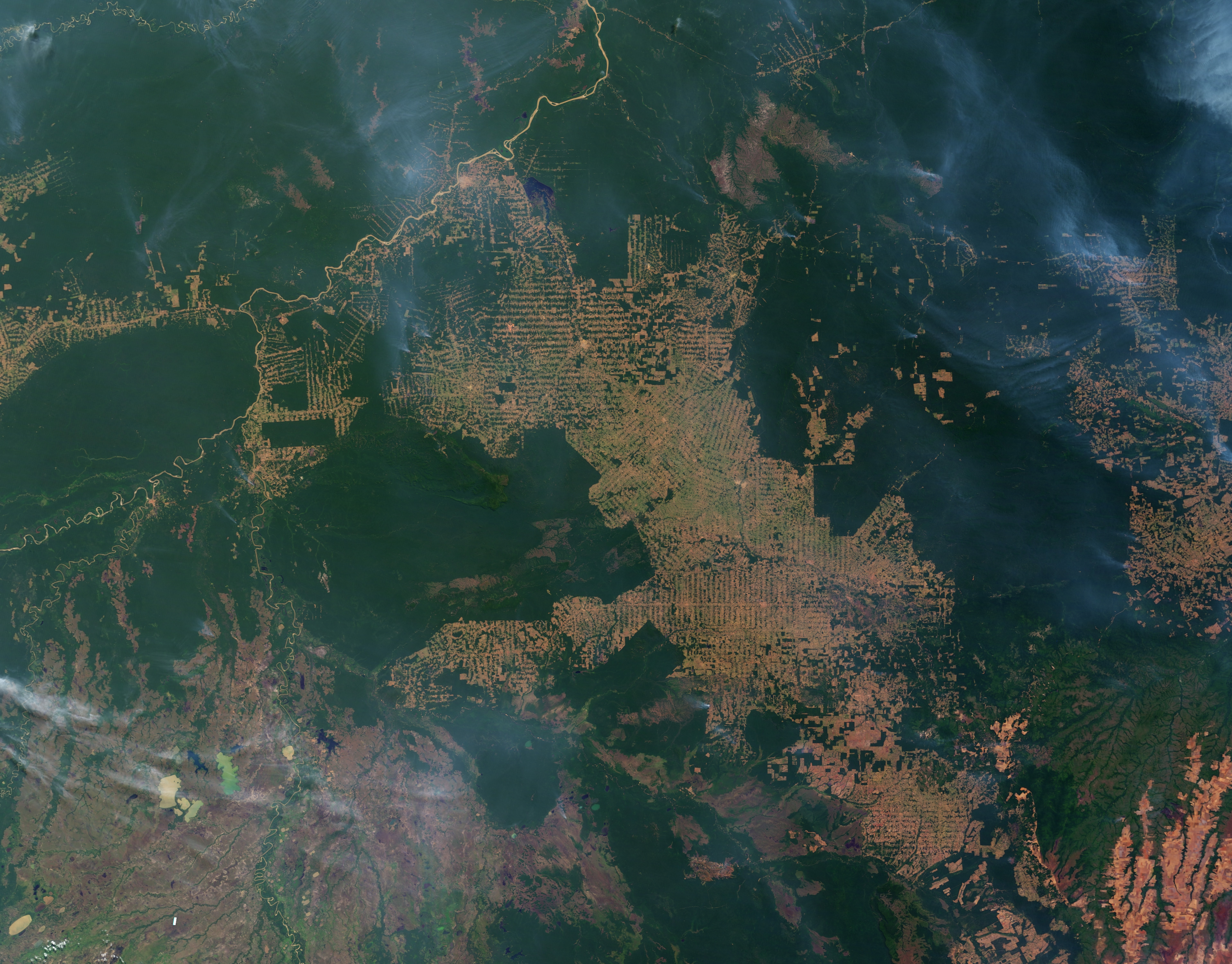
Due to a historical culture of uncontrolled deforestation, given its urban ethnic formation, of peoples from center-southern Brazil who were seeking cheap land in the 70s and 80s, Rondônia is today one of the states that deforests the most in the country.

The population of Rondônia is one of the most diverse in Brazil, composed of migrants from all regions of the country, among whom stand out the Paraná, São Paulo, Minas Gerais, and Rio Grande do Sul, who settled in the capital and the interior of the state.

=== Religion ===
47.6% Roman Catholic in the Archdiocese of Porto Velho (1925 as a Territorial Prelature) with 30 parishes under Archbishop Roque Paloschi (2015), and the two suffragan dioceses of Guajará-Mirim (1929 as a Territorial Prelature) with 13 parishes under Bishop Benedito Araújo (2011), and Ji-Paraná (1978 as the Territorial Prelature of Vila Rondônia) with 24 parishes under Bishop Norbert Hans Christoph Foerster (2020); 33.8% Protestant, 0.6% Spiritism, 3.7% other religion, 14.3% non-religious.

=== Indigenous peoples ===
Indigenous Territories in Rondônia.

As of 2011 there were 21 Indigenous Territories in Rondônia, with two more in process of being demarcated. The largest of these, the Uru-Eu-Wau-Wau Indigenous Territory, covers over 1.8 million hectares. Another, the Rio Omerê Indigenous Territory, is home to the Kanoê and Akuntsu people. Both tribes were the victims of massacres by cattle ranchers in the 1970s and 1980s and currently number just four and five individuals respectively.

Over 20 indigenous languages are spoken in Rondônia. Below is a list of indigenous languages spoken in the state:

Language	Family	Branch	ISO	Other names
Aikanã	language isolate		tba	Aikaná, Corumbiara, Huari, Kasupá, Kolumbiara, Masaká, Mundé, Tubarão, Uari, Wari
Kanoé	language isolate		kxo	Canoé, Canoê, Guaratégaya, Guarategaja, Koaratira, Guaratira, Amniapé, Kapixaná, Kapixana, Kapishanã
Kwaza	language isolate		xwa	Coaia, Koaiá, Koaya, Koayá, Quaiá, Arara
Kaxararí	Panoan		ktx	Kasharari, Kaxariri
Latundê	Nambikwaran		ltn	Leitodu
Sabanês	Nambikwaran		sae	Sabané, Sabanê, Sabanés, Sabanes, Sabones, Sowainte
Oro Win	Chapacuran		orw	dialects: Oro At, Oro Eo, Oro Mon, Oro Nao, Oro Waram, Oro Waram Xijem
Arikapú	Macro-Jê	Jabutí	ark	Aricapú, Maxubí
Jabutí	Macro-Jê	Jabutí	jbt	Djeoromitxi, Dheoromitxí, Kipiu, Jabotí, Quipiu, Yabutí
Arikem	Tupian	Arikem	ait	Ariken, Arikém, Ariquême
Karitiâna	Tupian	Arikem	ktn	Caritiana, Karitiána, Karitiana
Aruá	Tupian	Mondé	arx	Aruaxi, Aruashí
Gavião do Jiparaná	Tupian	Mondé	gvo	Digüt, Gavião, Gavião do Rondônia, Ikõro
Suruí	Tupian	Mondé	sru	Paiter, Suruí de Rondônia, Suruí do Jiparaná, Suruí Paiter
Puruborá	Tupian	Puruborá	pur	Aurã, Boruborá, Burubora, Cujubi, Kuyubi, Miguelenho, Migueleno, Pumbora, Puroborá, Puruba
Karo	Tupian	Ramarama	arr	Arara, Arára, Arára de Rondonia, Arára do Jiparaná, Arara-Karo, Itanga, Itogapuc, Itogapúk, Ntogapid, Ntogapig, Ramarama, Uruku, Urukú
Akuntsu	Tupian	Tuparí	aqz	
Makuráp	Tupian	Tuparí	mpu	Macuráp, Macurape, Macurapi, Makurápi, Massaka
Tuparí	Tupian	Tuparí	tpr	
Wayoró	Tupian	Tuparí	wyr	Ajurú, Ayurú, Uaiora, Wajaru, Wayru, Wayurú
Amundava	Tupian	Kawahiva	adw	Amondawa, Amondáwa, Amundawa, Amundáwa
Uru-Eu-Wau-Wau	Tupian	Kawahiva	urz	Eru-Eu-Wau-Wau, Kagwahiva, Uru-Eu-Uau-Uau, Uruewawau, Urueuwawáu
Warázu	Tupian	Guarayu	psm	Pauserna
Conjubim	Chapacuran			

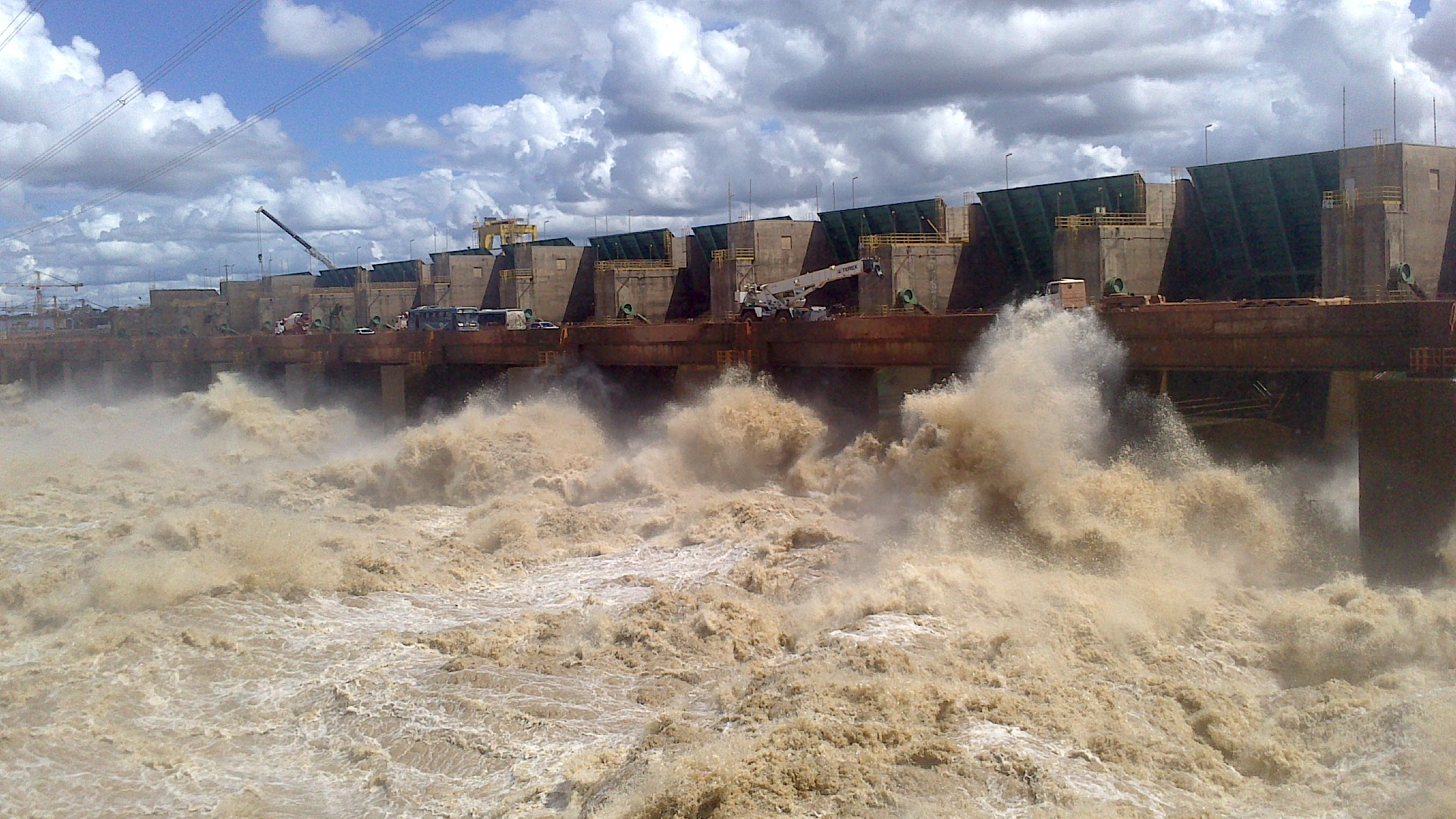
Santo Antônio Dam.

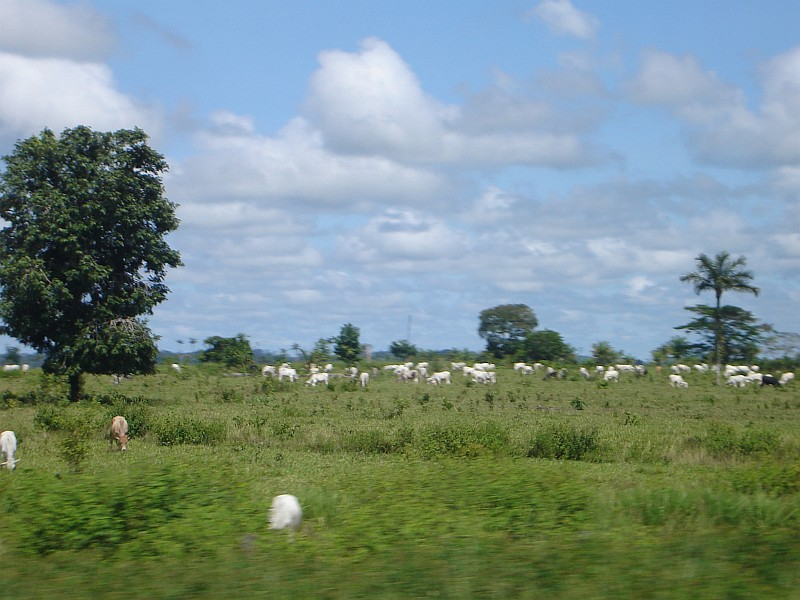
Animal husbandry in Ji-Paraná.

== Economy ==
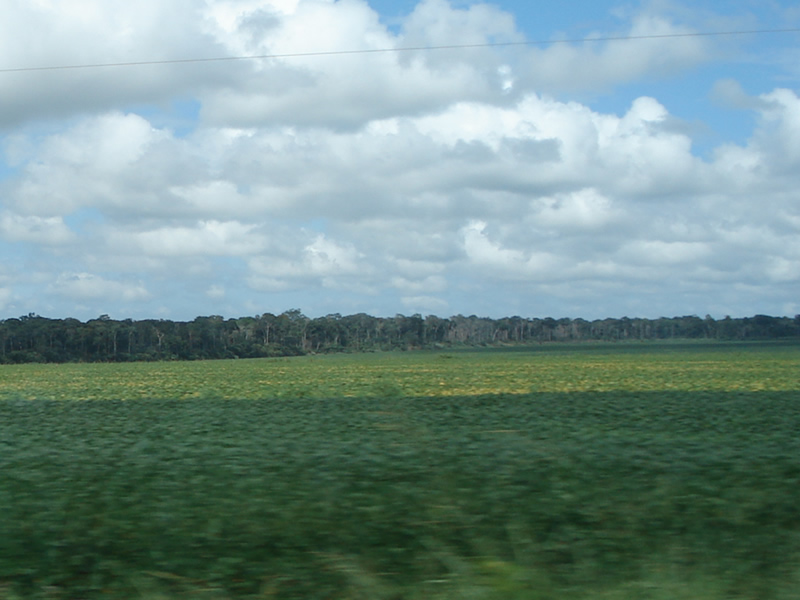
Soybeans in Ji-Paraná

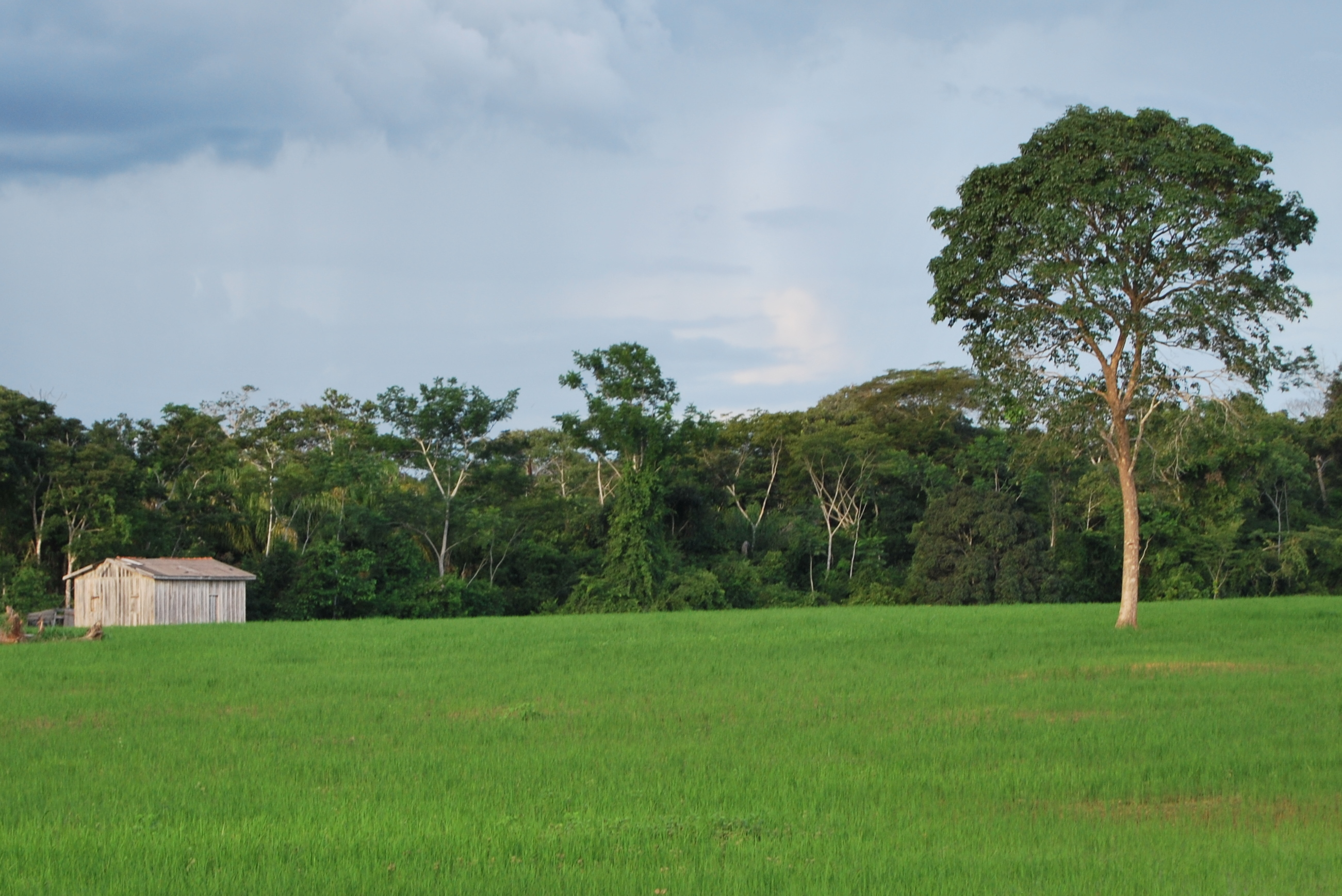
Rice in Presidente Médici

The economy of the state of Rondônia has, as main activities, agriculture, livestock, food industry and vegetal and mineral extraction. In 2016, the state's GDP reached R$39.451 billion. Its export basket is mainly composed of frozen beef (43.43%), soy (32.77%), raw tin (7.08%), sawn wood (2.36%) and edible giblets (2.02%).

Beginning in the 1970s, the state attracted farmers from the south-central part of the country, stimulated by the federal government's colonization projects and the availability of cheap and fertile land for illegal logging. The development of agricultural activities has transformed the area into one of the main agricultural frontiers in the country and one of the most prosperous and productive regions in northern Brazil. The state stands out in the production of coffee (largest producer in the North and 5th largest in Brazil), cocoa (2nd largest producer in the North and 3rd largest in Brazil), beans (2nd largest producer in the North), maize (2nd largest producer in the North region), soybean (3rd largest producer in the North region), rice (3rd largest producer in the North region) and cassava (4th largest producer in the North region). Despite the large volume of production and the small territory by the region's standards (7 times smaller than Amazonas and 6 times smaller than Pará), Rondônia still has more than 60% of its territory fully preserved.

In coffee production, Rondônia was, in 2019, the 5th largest producer in the country, being the 2nd largest producer of Coffea canephora, getting a total of 2.3 million bags of 60 kg of coffee (near 138 thousand tons) this year.

In soy, in the 2019 Brazilian harvest, Rondônia harvested 1.2 million tons, 3rd in the North Region.

In 2019, the state produced 805 thousand tons of maize, second largest production in the northern region, losing only to Tocantins.

In cassava production, Brazil produced a total of 17.6 million tons in 2018. Rondônia was the 11th largest producer in the country, with 583 thousand tons.

In 2018, Rondônia produced 124 thousand tons of rice.

In the production of cocoa, Pará has been competing with Bahia for the leadership of Brazilian production. In 2019, Pará harvested 135 thousand tons of cocoa, and Bahians harvested 130 thousand tons. Rondônia is the 3rd largest cocoa producer in the country, with 18 thousand tons harvested in 2017.

In 2017, the state had a cattle herd of 14,098,031 head of cattle (73,37% for beef and the rest for dairy), second largest herd in the North, second only to Pará, being the 6th largest in the country, 5th in meat exports and 8th in milk production. The state's milk production in 2018 was around 800 million liters, the largest producer in the North.

In 2017, Rondônia had 0.62% of the national mineral participation (8th place in the country). Rondônia had production of tin (10,9 thousand tons at a value of R$333 million), gold (1 ton at a value of R$125 million), niobium (in the form of columbita-tantalita) (3.5 thousand tons at R$24 million), and zinc in gross form (26 thousand tons at R$27 million) In addition, in gemstones, the state has some production of garnet.

In industry, Rondônia had an industrial GDP of R$8.2 billion in 2017, equivalent to 0.7% of the national industry. It employs 49,944 workers in the industry. The main industrial sectors are: Industrial Services of Public Utility, such as Electricity and Water (54.4%), Construction (19.2%), Food (17.6%), Wood (1.8%) and Non-metallic minerals (1.2%). These 5 sectors concentrate 94.2% of the state's industry.

== Transport ==
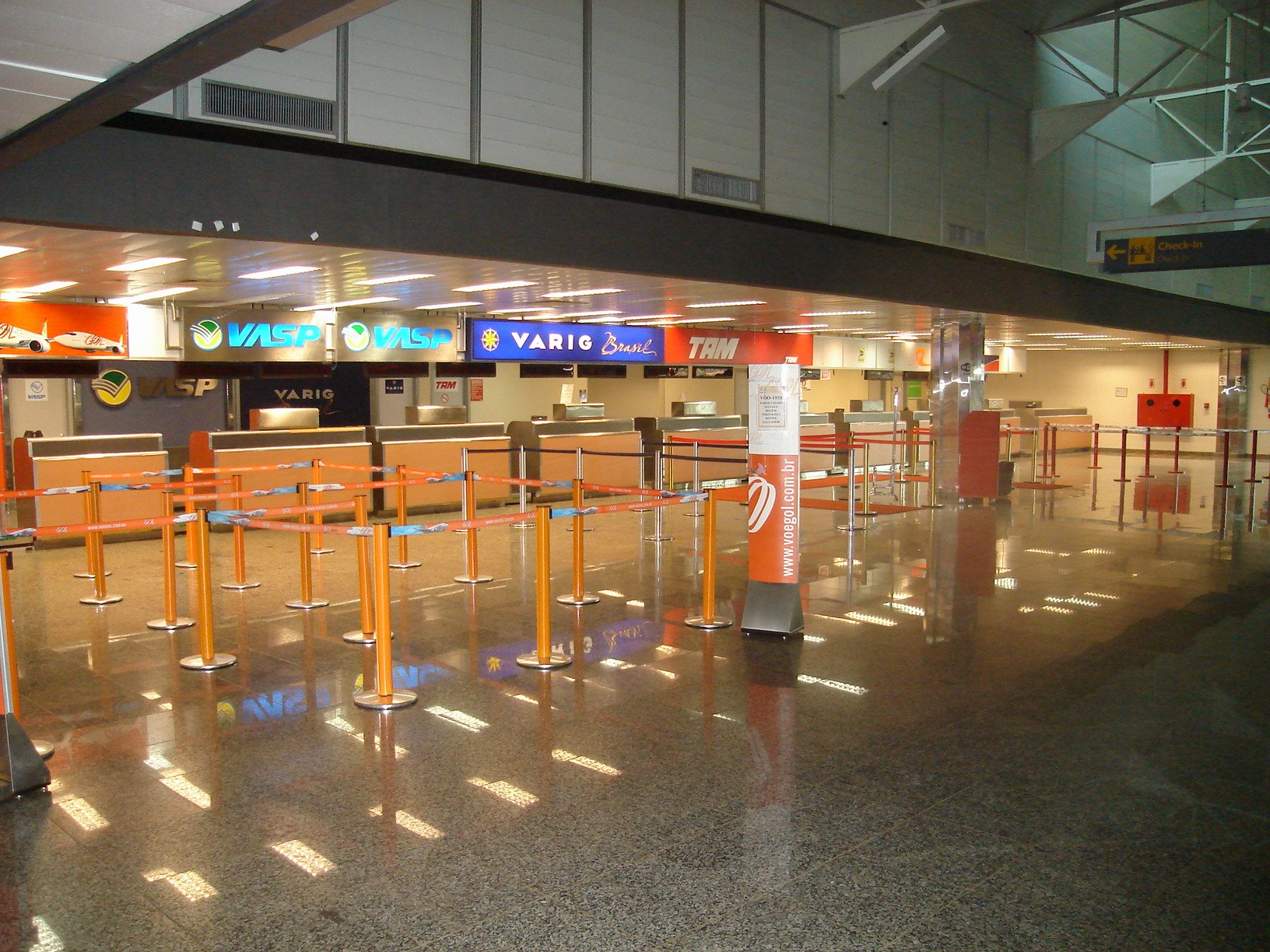
Porto Velho/Governador Jorge Teixeira de Oliveira International Airport.

Governador Jorge Teixeira de Oliveira International Airport is located in the state capital of Porto Velho.

Domestic airports at Ji-Paraná, Ariquemes, Pimenta Bueno, Guajará-Mirim, Vilhena and Principe da Beira.

Waterways:

Pôrto Velho is an Amazon River port.

The state of Rondônia has 24,000 kilometers of highways, of which only 7% are paved. The BR-364, fully paved in the Rondônia section, crosses the state from the border with Mato Grosso to the border with Acre. It is the main route for the outflow of grain production (especially soy) from the south of Rondônia and the west of Mato Grosso to the city of Porto Velho, where the grain port is located. A bridge is being built over the Madeira River (the first over this river), which aims to consolidate road transport between Brazil and Peru.

One road to Bolivia:

- from Principe da Beira along the Rio Blanco to Orobayaya,
- a ferry from Guajará-Mirim to Guayaramerín.

One road to Acre:

- BR-364.

One road to Amazonas:

- BR-319.

Six roads to Mato Grosso:

- RO-205 to MT-206,
- Linha 86 from RO-133 to MT-313,
- RO-472 to MT-313,
- MT-313 north from Min Andreazza,
- BR-174,
- BR-364.

== Education ==
The quality of Education in Rondônia is considered the fourteenth best in the country, compared to other Brazilian states. In the list of Brazilian states by HDI, with data from 2010, the "Education" factor reached an index of 0.557, an increase of more than 67% compared to 2000, when the state reached only 0.345.

According to the Brazilian Institute of Geography and Statistics (IBGE), in 2021 there were 244,815 enrollments in primary education in Rondônia.

== See also ==
- Legislative Assembly of the State of Rondônia
- List of municipalities in Rondônia
- List of Rondônia state symbols
