= Race and ethnicity in Colombia =

Colombians descend mainly from three racial groups—Europeans, Amerindians, and Africans—that have mixed throughout the last 500 years of Colombia's history. Some demographers describe Colombia as one of the most ethnically diverse countries in the Western Hemisphere and in the World, with 900 different ethnic groups. Most Colombians identify themselves and others according to ancestry, physical appearance, and sociocultural status. Social relations reflect the importance attached to certain characteristics associated with a given racial group. Although these characteristics no longer accurately differentiate social categories, they still contribute to one's rank in the social hierarchy. A study from DNA Tribes in 2012 determined that the average Colombian has a mixture of 56.7% Caucasian, 26.2% Amerindian, 8.5% Arab, 8.0% African, and 0.6% Asian. These proportions also vary widely among ethnicities.

Average Ancient genetic ancestry of Colombians according to ExploreYourDNA's Global25 (G25) model (2026):
1. Anatolian Neolithic farmers (35.3%)
2. Native American (Paleo-American) (31.4%)
3. Steppe herders (Yamnaya) (17.9%)
4. Western hunter-gatherers (6.20%)
5. West African (5.80%)
6. North African hunter-gatherers (Iberomaurusian) (3.50%)

== Racial/ethnic groups and their frequency ==
Ethnicity according to the 2018 Colombian Census:
1. Undeclared (85.0%)
2. Blacks (9.34%)
3. Indigenous (4.31%)
4. Romanis (0.01%)
5. Not specified (1.35%)
Ethnicity according to Latinobarómetro 2023:
1. Mestizos (50.3%)
2. Whites (26.4%)
3. Indigenous (9.50%)
4. Blacks (9.00%)
5. Mulattos (4.40%)
6. East Asians (0.40%)

Colombia officially acknowledges three ethnic minority groups: the Afro-Colombian, indigenous, and Romani populations. The Afro-Colombian population consists mainly of the African diaspora, mulattoes, raizales, palenqueros, and zambos (a term used since colonial times for individuals of mixed Amerindian and African ancestry). A 1999 resolution of the Ministry of the Interior and Justice acknowledged the Romani population as a Colombian ethnic group, although Romani people were not recognized in the 1991 constitution (unlike the Afro-Colombian and indigenous populations). Estimates vary widely, but the 2018 census found that the ethnic minority populations had increased significantly since the 1993 census, possibly owing to the methodology used. Specifically, it reported that the Afro-Colombian population accounted for 6.68 percent of the national population; the Amerindian population, for 4.31 percent; and the others like Romani for 0.06 percent The 2018 census reported that the "non-ethnic population", consisting of whites and mestizos, constituted 87 percent of the national population. A study by Latinobarómetro in 2023 estimates that 50.3% of the population are Mestizo or around 26 million people, 26.4% are White, 9.5% are Indigenous or around 5 million people, 9.0% are Black, 4.4% are Mulatto, and 0.4% are Asian, however estimates of each vary between sources. Therefore, it can be estimated that 26 million people are Mestizos (being the largest ethnic group in the country), 14 million people are White (includes castizos and euro-descendants), 5 million people are Indigenous, 5 million people are Black (excluding mulattos), 2 million people are Mulatto, and 200 thousand people are Asian, showcasing the diversity of Colombia as a nation.

=== Genetic composition ===
Genetic composition of Colombians according to the DNA Tribes study (2012).
1. Caucasian (56.7%) (56.7%)
2. Amerindian (26.2%) (26.2%)
3. Arab (8.5%) (8.50%)
4. African (8.0%) (8.00%)
5. Asian (0.6%) (0.60%)

== Regions ==
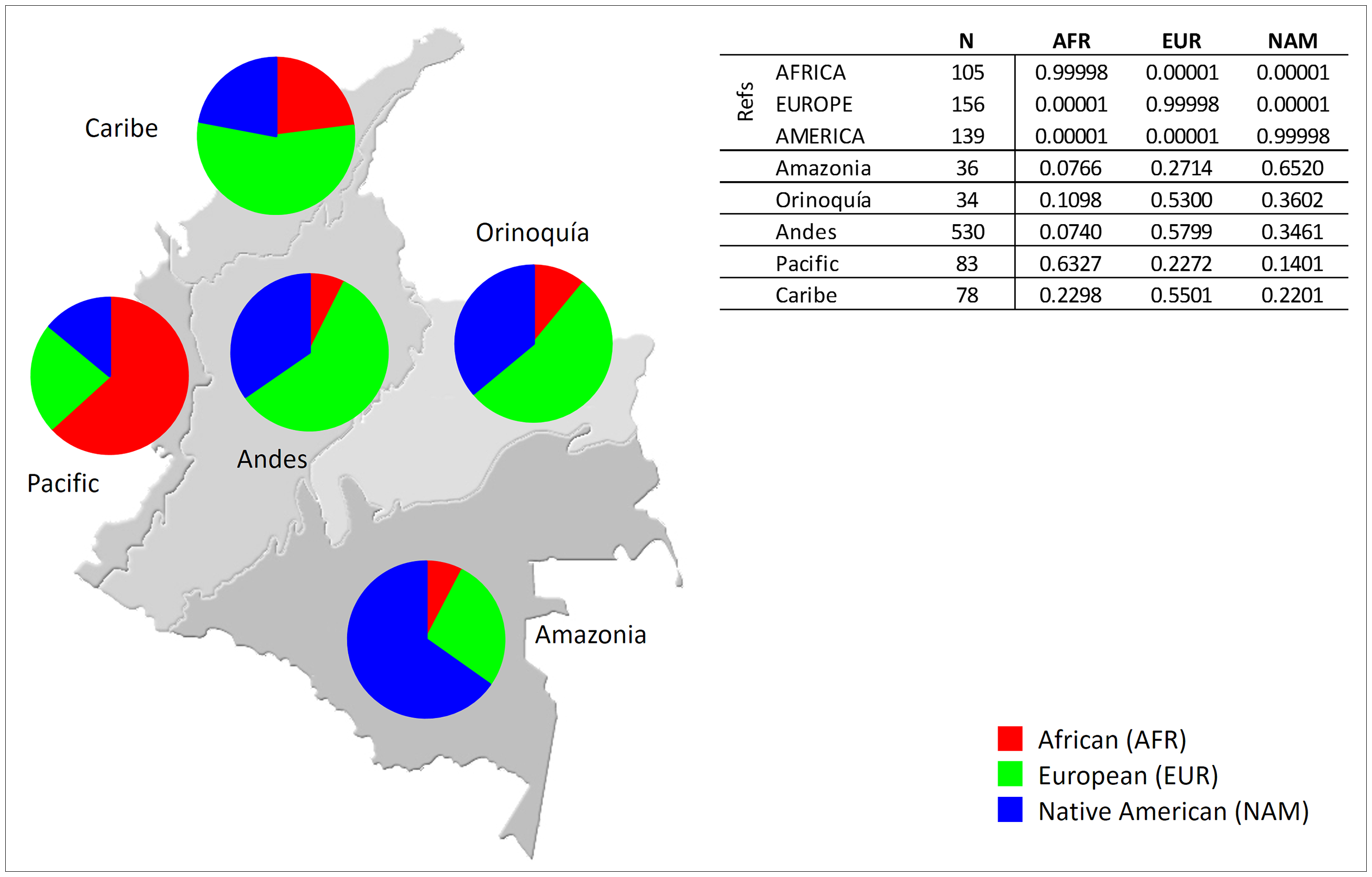
Genetic composition of Colombia by region, according to (Ossa et al., 2016).

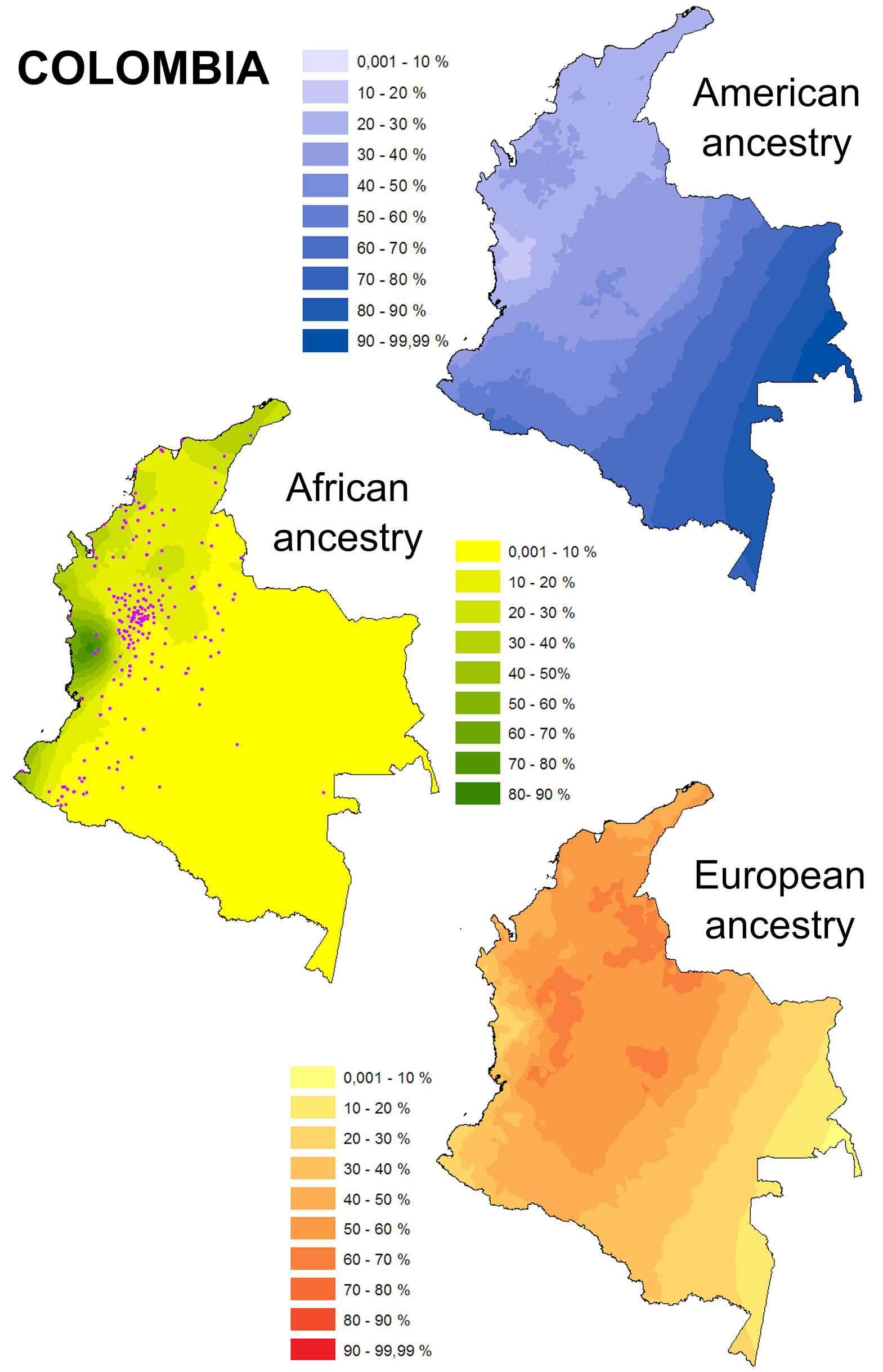
Ethnic distribution of European, Amerindian, and African ancestry in the country, according to (Ruiz-Linares et al., 2016).

- (Yunis, 1993), from the National University of Colombia, analyzed eight genetic systems in 30,259 individuals and determined that regional ancestry was distributed as follows:

Region	Departments	Caucasian contribution	Indigenous contribution	Black contribution
Amazonia	Caquetá, Putumayo, Guainía, Amazonas	64%–67%	29%–32%	3%–4%
Andean	Cundinamarca, Boyacá, Valle del Cauca, Antioquia, Nariño, Tolima, Caldas, Santander, Huila, Cauca, Risaralda, Norte de Santander, Quindío, Cesar, Bolívar	64%–66%	27%–29%	7%
Caribbean	Atlántico, Bolívar, Magdalena, Sucre, Cesar, La Guajira, Córdoba, Urabá	53%–58%	17%–24%	23%–25%
Insular	San Andrés and Providencia	41%–44%	0%–2%	56%–57%
Orinoquía	Meta, Casanare, Arauca, Vichada	66%–68%	28%–31%	3%–4%
Pacific	Chocó, Nariño, Valle del Cauca, Cauca	28%–30%	16%–19%	53%–54%
Colombia		61%–63%	26%–29%	10%–11%

The same study found that at the subregional level, genetic ancestry was as follows:

Subregion	Caucasian contribution	Indigenous contribution	Black contribution
Antioquia	65.0%–73.0%	14.0%–20.0%	14.5%
Boyacá	62.0%–71.0%	26.0%–35.0%	2.5%
Caribbean (without Urabá)	49.0%–56.0%	19.0%–26.0%	26.0%
Cauca	33.0%–40.0%	34.0%–41.3%	26.0%
Chocó	14.0%–16.5%	7.5%–10.6%	76.0%
Cundinamarca	62.0%–71.0%	25.0%–34.0%	3.5%
Nariño	43.0%–52.0%	40.0%–49.0%	7.8%
Eastern (Amazonia and Orinoquía)	60.0%–69.0%	27.5%–36.0%	3.9%
Pacific (with Urabá)	32.0%–35.0%	14.0%–15.0%	51.0%
Paisa (Antioquia and Viejo Caldas)	64.0%–71.0%	17.0%–24.0%	11.7%
Santanderes	65.0%–73.0%	21.0%–29.0%	5.9%
Tolima Grande	59.0%–67.0%	26.0%–34.0%	6.8%
Valle del Cauca	50.0%–57.0%	22.0%–29.0%	21.0%
Viejo Caldas	65.0%–73.0%	19.0%–26.0%	8.8%

- According to (Ossa et al., 2016), in a study carried out across the five Natural regions of Colombia, the genetic composition is as follows:

Region	Departments	Samples	African contribution	European contribution	Native American contribution
Amazonia	Amazonas, Guainía, Caquetá, Putumayo	36	7.66%	27.14%	65.20%
Andes	Antioquia, Boyacá, Caldas, Cundinamarca, Huila, Nariño, Norte de Santander, Putumayo, Quindío, Risaralda, Santander, Tolima, Valle del Cauca	530	7.40%	57.99%	34.61%
Caribbean	Atlántico, Bolívar, Cesar, Córdoba, La Guajira, Magdalena, Sucre	78	22.98%	55.01%	22.01%
Orinoquía	Arauca, Casanare, Meta	34	10.98%	53.00%	36.02%
Pacific	Chocó	83	63.27%	22.72%	14.01%

In the same study, the Andean region was divided into six subregions, whose genetic composition was as follows:

Subregion	Departments	Number of samples	African contribution	European contribution	Native American contribution
Central-East	Boyacá, Cundinamarca	143	5.10%	58.86%	36.04%
Central-West	Antioquia, Caldas, Quindío, Risaralda	59	7.87%	66.91%	25.22%
Northeast	Norte de Santander, Santander	150	6.93%	58.10%	34.97%
West	Valle del Cauca	44	14.04%	55.43%	30.54%
Southeast	Huila, Tolima	118	8.12%	54.54%	37.34%
Southwest	Nariño, Putumayo	16	7.07%	48.65%	44.28%

Rojas et al. (2010) measured the genetic mixture for fourteen Colombian departments:

Department	Amerindian contribution	European contribution	African contribution
Antioquia	26%	63.5%	10.3%
Antioquia (Peque)	62.2%	31.1%	5.8%
Bolívar	32.9%	23.3%	43.8%
Caldas	36.4%	59.6%	4.3%
Casanare	74.7%	24.5%	0.8%
Cauca	56.9%	19.6%	23.5%
Chocó (Afro Colombians)	10.8%	21.1%	68.1%
Chocó (Mestizos)	44.8%	46.6%	8.6%
Cundinamarca	51.6%	45.4%	3%
Huila	60.8%	39.6%	0%
Magdalena	21.8%	50%	28.2%
Nariño	65.2%	32.1%	2.7%
Norte de Santander	53%	42.2%	4.7%
Quindío	38.3%	57.3%	4.4%
Santander	42.4%	56.2%	1.4%
Valle del Cauca	39.3%	39.2%	21.5%
Colombia	47%	42%	11%

== Distribution of racial/ethnic groups geographically ==
Ethnography of Colombia by municipality.

The various groups exist in differing concentrations throughout the nation, in a pattern that to some extent goes back to colonial origins. The Whites tend to live mainly in the urban centers like Bogotá or Medellín. The populations of the major cities are primarily mestizo and white. The large Mestizo population includes most campesinos (people living in rural areas) of the Andean highlands, where some Spanish conquerors mixed with the women of Amerindian chiefdoms. Mestizos had always lived in the cities as well, as artisans and small tradesmen, and they have played a major part in the urban expansion of recent decades. According to the 2005 census, the heaviest concentration of the indigenous population (22 to 61 percent) is located in the departments of Amazonas, La Guajira, Guainía, Vaupés, and Vichada. The secondary concentrations of 6 to 21 percent are located in the departments of Sucre, Córdoba, Chocó, Cauca and Nariño. Amerindian communities have legal autonomy to enforce their own traditional laws and customs. Despite being around 4-10% of the population, the indigenous population has managed to regain nearly a quarter of the country's land titles under the 1991 constitution.

Black population of Colombia by municipality in 2005.

Indigenous population of Colombia by municipality in 2005.

The 1991 National Constitution of Colombia defined Territorial Entities (Entidades Territoriales) as departments, districts, municipalities and indigenous territories. Within an Indigenous Territory Entity (ETI) the people have autonomy in managing their interests, and within the limits of the constitution have the right to manage resources and define taxes required to perform their duties. ETIs are to be defined by the government in conformance with the Organic Law on Land Management. However, this law has yet to be sanctioned so in practice the territories are unregulated.

The Black, Zambo and Mulatto populations have largely remained in the lowland areas on the Caribbean and Pacific coasts, its islands, and along the Cauca and Magdalena Rivers. The Afro descendent Colombian population is concentrated primarily (21% to 80% of their departments) in the departments of Chocó, San Andrés, Bolívar and in the lowland parts of Cauca (communities such as Lopez de Micay, Guapi, and Timbiqui), and Valle del Cauca departments (in areas like the largest city on the Pacific coast, Buenaventura, and large concentration in Cali), with secondary concentrations (10 to 18 percent of the departments) in Atlántico, Córdoba, Magdalena, Nariño (communities like El Charco, Tumaco and Barbacoas), Antioquia (mostly in Uraba region), La Guajira, Cesar, and Sucre departments. Chocó is the department with the largest concentration of African-descendants in Colombia.

The population of the Archipelago of San Andrés, Providencia and Santa Catalina, which Colombia inherited from Spain after the Spanish had overcome an initial British settlement, is mostly Afro-Colombian, including several thousand raizal blacks. Despite the length of time during which Colombia has had jurisdiction over them, most raizales on these Caribbean islands have retained their Protestant religion, have continued to speak an English-based creole language as well as English, and have regarded themselves as a group distinct from mainland residents. A minute percentage of the insular population originated in Scotland and Syria.

Ethnic groups according to self identification. Data from the 2018 Colombian Census.
Department	Total population (2018)	Indigenous	%	Afro-Colombian	%	Other (most being Mestizo or White)	%
Amazonas	66,056	38,130	57.7	486	0.73	27,440	41.5
Antioquia	5,974,788	37,628	0.60	312,112	5.22	5,625,048	94.1
Arauca	239,503	6,573	2.70	10,058	4.19	222,872	93.0
Atlántico	2,342,265	39,061	1.70	140,142	5.98	2,163,062	92.3
Bogotá	7,181,469	19,063	0.30	66,934	0.93	7,095,472	98.8
Bolívar	1,909,460	5,204	0.30	319,396	16.7	1,584,860	83.0
Boyacá	1,135,698	7,151	0.60	4,247	0.37	1,124,300	98.9
Caldas	923,472	55,801	6.00	14,716	1.59	852,955	92.3
Caquetá	359,602	8,825	2.50	5,087	1.41	345,690	96.1
Casanare	379,892	6,893	1.80	6,130	1.61	366,869	96.5
Cauca	1,243,503	308,455	24.8	245,362	19.7	689,686	55.4
Cesar	1,098,577	51,233	4.70	142,436	12.9	904,908	82.3
Chocó	457,412	68,415	15.0	337,696	73.8	51,301	11.2
Córdoba	1,555,596	202,621	13.0	102,495	6.58	1,250,480	80.4
Cundinamarca	2,792,877	9,949	0.40	13,092	0.46	2,769,836	99.1
Guainía	44,431	33,280	74.9	460	1.03	10,691	24.0
Guaviare	73,081	6,856	9.40	2,991	4.09	63,234	86.5
Huila	1,009,548	12,194	1.20	5,099	0.50	992,255	98.3
La Guajira	825,365	394,683	47.8	60,475	7.32	370,207	44.8
Magdalena	1,263,788	20,938	1.70	106,318	8.41	1,136,532	89.9
Meta	919,129	20,528	2.20	8,836	0.96	889,765	96.8
Nariño	1,335,521	206,455	15.5	233,062	17.45	896,004	67.1
Norte de Santander	1,346,806	4,545	0.60	5,470	0.40	1,336,791	99.2
Putumayo	283,197	50,694	17.9	10,262	3.62	222,241	78.4
Quindío	509,640	2,883	0.60	6,060	1.18	500,697	98.2
Risaralda	839,597	29,909	3.60	16,733	1.99	792,955	94.4
San Andrés y Providencia	48,299	20	0.00	26,873	55.6	21,406	44.3
Santander	2,008,841	1,262	0.10	22,759	1.13	1,984,820	98.8
Sucre	864,036	104,890	12.1	102,836	11.9	656,310	75.9
Tolima	1,228,763	45,269	3.70	5,207	0.42	1,178,287	95.8
Valle del Cauca	3,789,874	30,844	0.80	647,526	17.0	3,111,504	82.1
Vaupés	37,690	30,787	81.7	288	0.76	6,615	17.5
Vichada	76,642	44,578	58.2	580	0.75	31,484	41.0

== Social status of racial/ethnic minorities ==
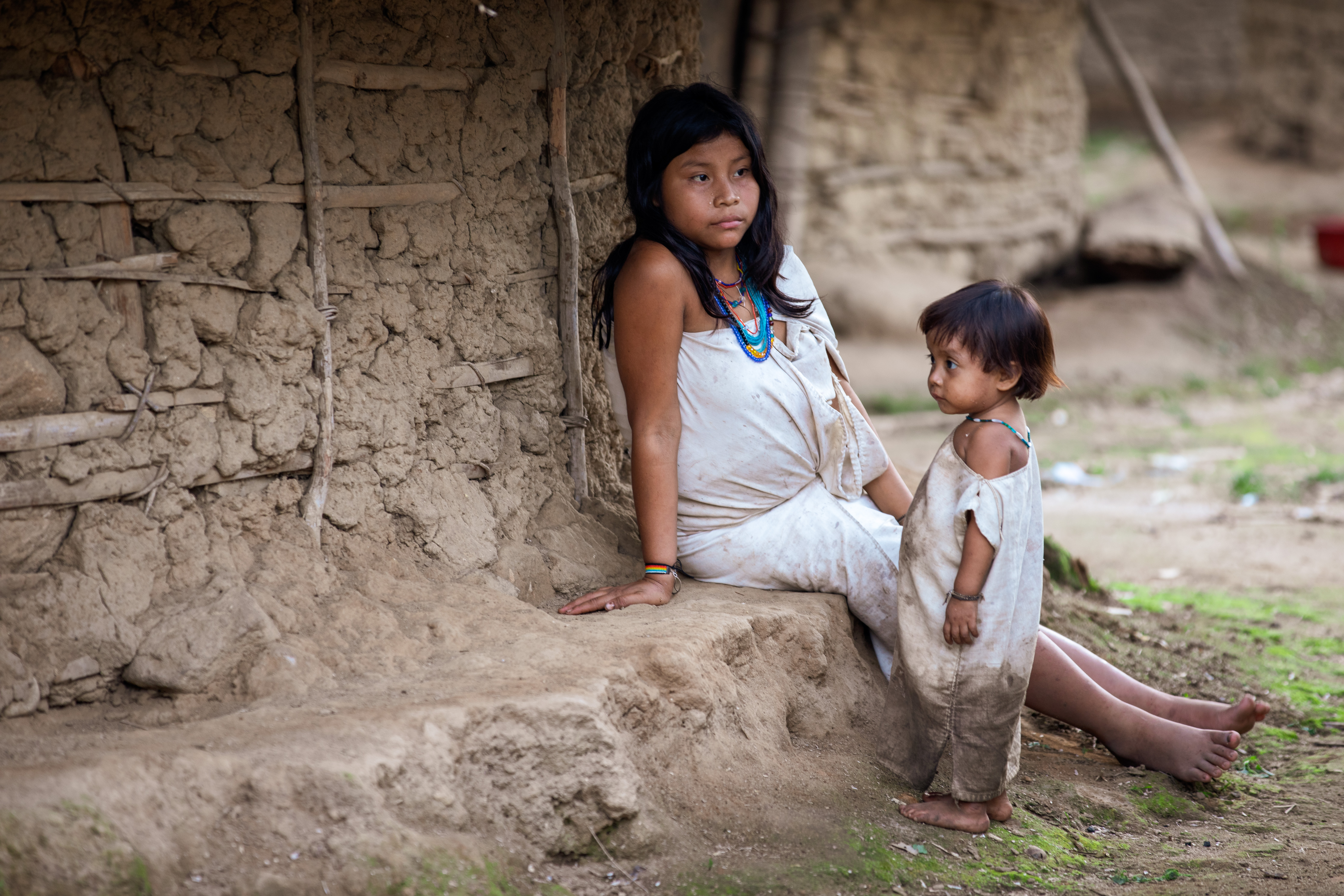
Indigenous children in Colombia.

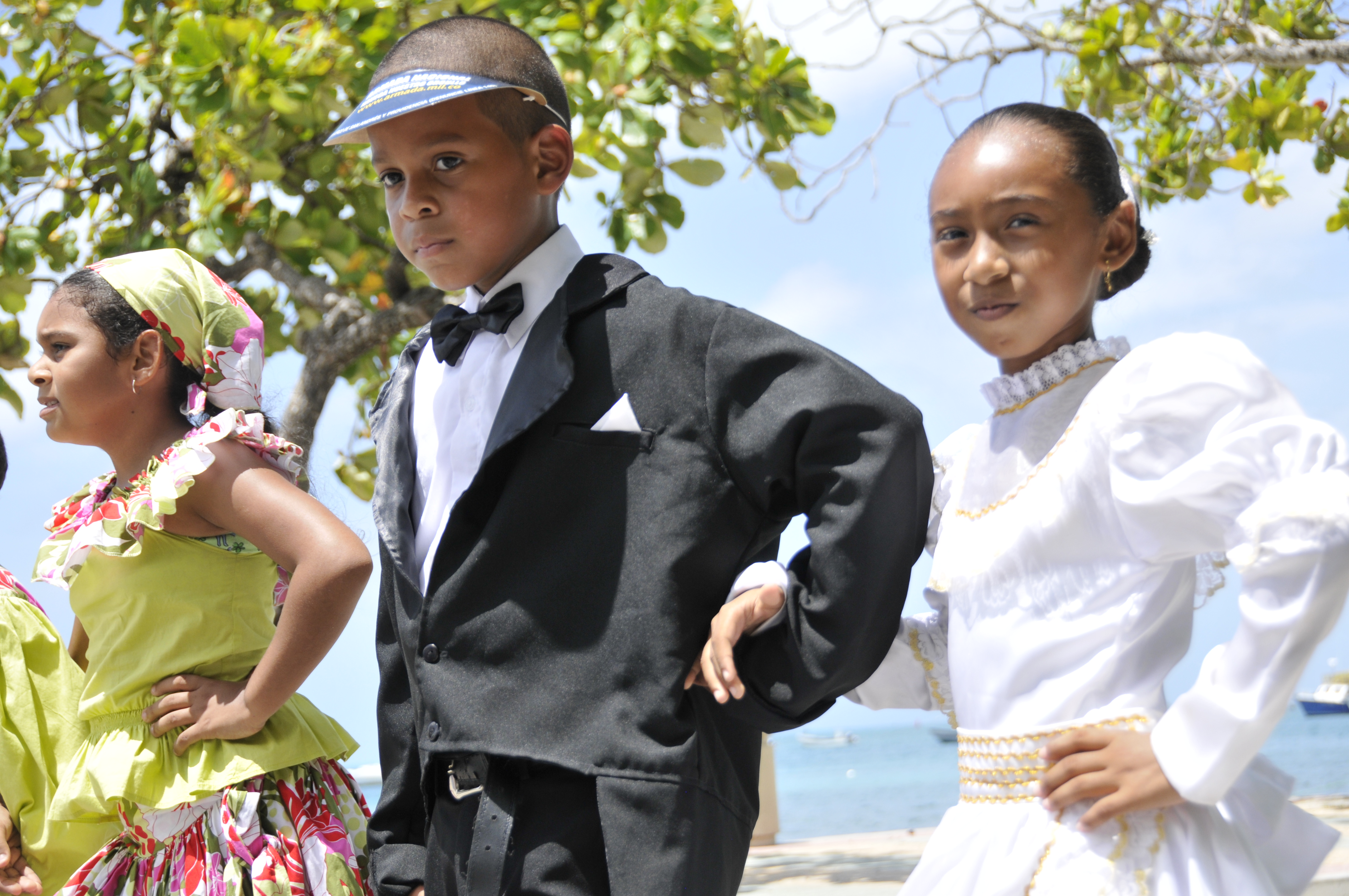
Raizal children in Colombia.

Since independence both Amerindians and blacks have continued to reside on the outskirts of national life. As a group, however, blacks have become more integrated into the national society and have left a greater mark on it for several reasons. Moreover, the blacks came from different areas of Africa, often did not share the same language or culture, and were not grouped into organized social units on arrival in the New World. Despite slave revolts, no large community of escaped slaves survived in isolation to preserve its African heritage, as did the maroons in Jamaica, except for the village of Palenque de San Basilio, located southeast of Cartagena, which was one of the walled communities called 'palenques', founded by escaped slaves as a refuge in the seventeenth century. Of the many palenques that existed in former times, only the one of San Basilio has survived until the present day and developed into a unique cultural space.

Finally, despite their position on the bottom rung of the social ladder, black slaves often had close relations—as domestic servants—with Spaniards and British and were therefore exposed to Spanish culture much more than were the Amerindians. Thus, blacks became a part of Colombian society from the beginning, adopting the ways of the Spanish that were permitted them and learning their language. By the end of the colonial period, the blacks thought of themselves as Colombians and felt superior to the Amerindians, who officially occupied higher status, were nominally free, and were closer in skin color, facial features, and hair texture to the emerging mestizo mix.

Many blacks left slave status early in Colombian history, becoming part of the free population. Their owners awarded freedom to some, others purchased their liberty, but probably the greatest number achieved freedom by escape. Many slaves were liberated as a result of revolts, particularly in the Cauca valley and along the Caribbean coast. The elimination of slavery began with a free-birth law in 1821, but total emancipation was enacted only in 1851, becoming effective on January 1, 1852.

Those blacks who achieved freedom sometimes moved into Amerindian communities, but blacks and zambos remained at the bottom of the social scale and were important only as a source of labor. Others founded their own settlements, mainly in unsettled lands of the Pacific basin where they were called cimarrones (maroons). Those regions were very unhealthy, inhospitable, and dangerous. Several towns, such as San Basilio de Palenque in the present department of Bolívar, and San José de Uré in southern Córdoba, kept the history of revolt alive in their oral traditions. In the Chocó area, along the Pacific, many of the black communities remained relatively unmixed, probably because there were few whites in the area, and the Amerindians became increasingly resistant to assimilation.

In other regions, such as San Andrés y Providencia, or the Magdalena valley, black communities had considerable white and/or Amerindian admixture. Descendants of slaves have preserved relatively little of their African heritage or identification. Some placenames are derived from African languages, and some traditional musical instruments brought into the country by slaves are used throughout the country. Religion in the black communities remains the most durable link with the African past. Wholly black communities have been disappearing, not only because their residents have been moving to the cities but also because the surrounding mestizo and white populations have been moving into black communities. Eventual absorption into the mixed milieu appears inevitable. Moreover, as blacks have moved into the mainstream of society from its peripheries, they have perceived the advantages of better education and jobs. Rather than forming organizations to promote their advancement as a group, blacks have for the most part concentrated on achieving mobility through individual effort and adaptation to the prevailing system.

Afro-Colombians are entitled to all constitutional rights and protections, but they continue to face significant economic and social discrimination. According to the 2005 census, an estimated 74 percent of Afro-Colombians earned less than the minimum wage. Chocó, the department with the highest percentage of Afro-Colombian residents, had the lowest level of social investment per capita and ranked last in terms of education, health, and infrastructure. It also continued to experience some of the country's worst political violence, as paramilitaries and guerrillas struggled for control of the department's key drug- and weapons-smuggling corridors.

=== Media ===
The television comedy Sábados Felices has been criticised for including a blackface character.

== Immigrants in Colombia ==
Colombia has received across its history different groups of immigrants.

White Colombians are mainly of Spanish descent, who arrived in the beginning of the 16th century when Colombia was part of the Spanish Empire. During the 19th and 20th centuries, other European and Middle Eastern peoples migrated to Colombia, notably Italian and Lebanese people but also Irish, Germans, French, Palestinians, Syrians among others.

Colombia was one of early focus of Basque and Sephardi immigration. Between 1540 and 1559, 8.9% of the residents of Colombia were of Basque origin. Basque priests introduced handball into Colombia. Jewish converts to Christianity and some crypto-Jews also sailed with the early conquistadors.

Many immigrant communities have settled on the Caribbean coast, in particular recent immigrants from the Middle East. Barranquilla (the largest city of the Colombian Caribbean) and other Caribbean cities have the largest populations of Lebanese, Palestinian, and other Arabs. In some sectors of society there is a considerable input of Italian and German ancestry.

There are also important communities of Chinese, Japanese, Romanis and Jews. British and Jamaicans migrated mainly to the islands of San Andres and Providencia.

Since 2010 there is a major migration trend of Venezuelans, due to the political and economic situation in Venezuela.

== List of contemporary ethnic groups in Colombia ==
Name	Traditional Language	Language Family	Larger group	Population (2018)
Costeño (Caribbean Colombian)	Spanish	Indo-European (Romance)	Hispanic Colombian	8,087,765
Cundiboyacense (including Bogotá)	Spanish	Indo-European (Romance)	Hispanic Colombian	8,009,509
Paisa	Spanish	Indo-European (Romance)	Hispanic Colombian	7,771,655
Santandereano	Spanish	Indo-European (Romance)	Hispanic Colombian	3,321,611
Opita (Huilense)	Spanish	Indo-European (Romance)	Hispanic Colombian	1,337,945
Chocoano	Spanish	Indo-European (Romance)	Afro-Colombian	1,230,584
Tolimense	Spanish	Indo-European (Romance)	Hispanic Colombian	1,178,287
Venezuelan	Spanish	Indo-European (Romance)	Hispanic American	1,048,714
Afro-Costeño (Caribbean Colombian)	Spanish	Indo-European (Romance)	Afro-Colombian	974,098
Wayuu	Wayuunaiki	Arawakan	Indigenous	380,460
Zenú	Zenú	Zenú	Indigenous	307,091
Nasa	Nasa Yuwe	Paezan	Indigenous	243,176
Pasto	Pasto	Barbacoan	Indigenous	163,873
Emberá Chamí	Chamí	Chocoan	Indigenous	77,714
Emberá	Cholo	Chocoan	Indigenous	56,504
Sikuani	Sikuani	Guahiban	Indigenous	52,361
Pijao	Pijao	Cariban	Indigenous	51,635
Emberá Katío	Catío	Chocoan	Indigenous	48,117
Awá	Awa Pit	Barbacoan	Indigenous	44,516
Mokaná	Mocana	Malibu	Indigenous	37,099
Yanacona	Yanacona	Quechuan	Indigenous	34,897
Arhuaco	Ikʉ	Chibchan	Indigenous	34,711
Raizal	Creole English	Indo-European (Germanic)	Afro-Colombian	25,515
Misak	Namtrik	Barbacoan	Indigenous	21,713
American (United States)	English	Indo-European (Germanic)	Anglo American	20,140
Inga	Inga Kichwa	Quechuan	Indigenous	19,561
Wiwa	Wiwa	Chibchan	Indigenous	18,202
Coconuco	Coconuco	Barbacoan	Indigenous	18,135
Kankuamo	Kankui	Chibchan	Indigenous	16,986
Kogui	Kogi	Chibchan	Indigenous	15,820
Wounan	Wounan	Chocoan	Indigenous	14,825
Piapoco	Piapoco	Arawakan	Indigenous	14,661
Witoto	Witoto	Witotoan	Indigenous	14,142
Cubeo	Cubeo	Tucanoan	Indigenous	14,074
Ticuna	Ticuna	Ticuna-Yuri	Indigenous	13,842
Muruí	Muruí	Witotoan	Indigenous	12,029
Baniwa	Karu	Arawakan	Indigenous	11,946
Muisca	Muysccubun	Chibchan	Indigenous	11,265
U'wa	Uw Cuwa	Chibchan	Indigenous	10,649
German	German	Indo-European (Germanic)	German Colombian	9,668
Puinave	Puinave	Puinave	Indigenous	8,984
Totoró	Totoró	Barbacoan	Indigenous	8,916
Kamëntsá	Camsá	Camsá	Indigenous	7,521
Quillacinga	Quillacinga	Quillacinga	Indigenous	7,333
Eperara Siapidara	Eperara	Chocoan	Indigenous	7,047
Palenquero	Palenquero	Indo-European (Romance)	Afro-Colombian	6,637
Sáliva	Sáliva	Piaroa–Saliban	Indigenous	4,783
Emberá Dobidá	Dobidá	Chocoan	Indigenous	4,233
Tukano	Tucano	Tucanoan	Indigenous	4,075
Kizgó	Kizgó	Barbacoan	Indigenous	3,974
Quechua	Kichwa	Quechuan	Indigenous	3,688
Desano	Desano	Tucanoan	Indigenous	3,641
Yukpa	Yukpa	Cariban	Indigenous	3,610
Mennonites	Plautdietsch	Indo-European (Germanic)	German Colombian	3,402
Wanano	Wanano	Tucanoan	Indigenous	3,312
Ambaló	Namtrik	Barbacoan	Indigenous	3,278
Coreguaje	Coreguaje	Tucanoan	Indigenous	3,257
Cocama	Kokama	Tupian	Indigenous	3,221
Bari	Bari	Chibchan	Indigenous	3,018
Guayabero	Jiw	Guahiban	Indigenous	2,960
Rrom	Romani	Indo-European (Indo-Aryan)	Romani	2,649
Guna Dule	Dulegaya	Chibchan	Indigenous	2,610
Siona	Siona	Tucanoan	Indigenous	2,599
Polindara	Polindara	Barbacoan	Indigenous	2,499
Emberá Chamí (Cañamomo Lomaprieta)	Chamí	Chocoan	Indigenous	2,225
Amorúa	Amorúa	Guahiban	Indigenous	2,211
Muinane	Muinane	Bora–Witoto	Indigenous	2,113
Makuna	Makuna	Tucanoan	Indigenous	1,962
Kofán	Cofán	Cofán	Indigenous	1,816
Macahuán	Macahuán	Guahiban	Indigenous	1,764
Ette Ennaka	Ette taara	Chibchan	Indigenous	1,701
Siriano	Siriano	Tupian	Indigenous	1,658
Yukuna	Yukuna	Arawakan	Indigenous	1,582
Tuyuca	Tuyuca	Tucanoan	Indigenous	1,467
Piaroa	Piaroa	Piaroa–Saliban	Indigenous	1,127
Piratapuyo	Wanano	Tucanoan	Indigenous	1,106
Tatuyo	Tatuyo	Tucanoan	Indigenous	1,091
Indigenous Ecuadorian (other than Otavaleño)	Kichwa	Quechuan	Indigenous	1,088
Bora	Bora	Bora–Witoto	Indigenous	1,047
Carapaná	Carapaná	Tucanoan	Indigenous	1,040
Bara	Waimajã	Tucanoan	Indigenous	1,004
Tanimuka	Tanimuka	Tucanoan	Indigenous	991
Yagua	Yagua	Peba–Yaguan	Indigenous	984
Achagua	Achawa	Arawakan	Indigenous	980
Yurutí	Yurutí	Tucanoan	Indigenous	969
Barasano	Barasana	Tucanoan	Indigenous	905
Cuiba	Cuiba	Guahiban	Indigenous	895
Andoke	Andoke	Bora–Witoto	Indigenous	820
Kawiyarí	Kawiyarí	Arawakan	Indigenous	809
Miraña	Miraña	Bora–Witoto	Indigenous	759
Nukak	Nukak	Puinave-Maku	Indigenous	744
Matapí	Yucuna	Arawakan	Indigenous	618
Dujos	Tama	Tama	Indigenous	611
Yeral (Tupi)	Nheengatu	Tupian	Indigenous	565
Karijona	Karijona	Cariban	Indigenous	525
Masiguare	Masiguare	Guahiban	Indigenous	522
Hitnu	Hitnu	Guahiban	Indigenous	513
Ocaína	Ocaína	Bora–Witoto	Indigenous	412
Wipiwi	Cuiba	Guahiban	Indigenous	299
Letuama	Letuama	Tucanoan	Indigenous	285
Nonuya	Nonuya	Bora–Witoto	Indigenous	258
Andaki	Andaki	Andaki	Indigenous	248
Tariano	Tariana	Arawakan	Indigenous	210
Otavaleño	Kichwa	Quechuan	Indigenous	210
Guane	Guane	Chibchan	Indigenous	200
Pisamira	Pisamira	Tucanoan	Indigenous	196
Baniva	Karu	Arawakan	Indigenous	187
Nutabe	Nutabe	Chibchan	Indigenous	178
Indigenous Venezuelan	Wayuunaiki	Arawakan	Indigenous	157
Kakua	Kakua	Kakua	Indigenous	147
Tanigua	Tanigua	Tiniguan	Indigenous	145
Yamalero	Yamalero	Guahiban	Indigenous	142
Yaruro	Yaruro	Yaruro	Indigenous	136
Betoye	Betoye	Betoye	Indigenous	127
Taiwano	Taiwano	Tucanoan	Indigenous	123
Yauna	Yauna	Tucanoan	Indigenous	105
Mapayerri	Mapayerri	Mapayerri	Indigenous	104
Calima	Calima	Calima	Indigenous	102
Quimbaya	Quimbaya	Quimbaya	Indigenous	94
Tsiripu	Tsiripu	Guahiban	Indigenous	75
Mayan (Guatemalan)	Kʼicheʼ	Mayan	Indigenous	65
Guariquema	Guariquema	Guariquema	Indigenous	62
Panche	Panche	Cariban	Indigenous	55
Makú	Cacua	Puinave-Maku	Indigenous	50
Indigenous Peruvian	Quechua	Quechuan	Indigenous	44
Tayrona	Tayrona	Chibchan	Indigenous	43
Indigenous Brazilian	Nheengatu	Tupian	Indigenous	36
Jupda	Hup	Nadahup	Indigenous	33
Je'eruriwa	Yucuna	Arawakan	Indigenous	29
Makaguaje	Makaguaje	Tucanoan	Indigenous	24
Indigenous Bolivian	Aymara	Aymaran	Indigenous	22
Chiricoa	Chiricoa	Guahiban	Indigenous	19
Indigenous Panamanian	Ngäbere	Chibchan	Indigenous	16
Guanaca	Guanaca	Guanaca	Indigenous	14
Yarí	Yarí	Yarí	Indigenous	14
Chitarero	Chitarero	Chitarero	Indigenous	10
Indigenous Mexican	Nahuatl	Uto-Aztecan	Indigenous	5
Juhup	Hup	Nadahup	Indigenous	4
Hupdu	Hup	Nadahup	Indigenous	1
Yuri-Carabayo	Carabayo	Ticuna-Yuri	Indigenous	No data

== See also ==
- Demographics of Colombia
- Immigration to Colombia
