= Languages of Colombia =

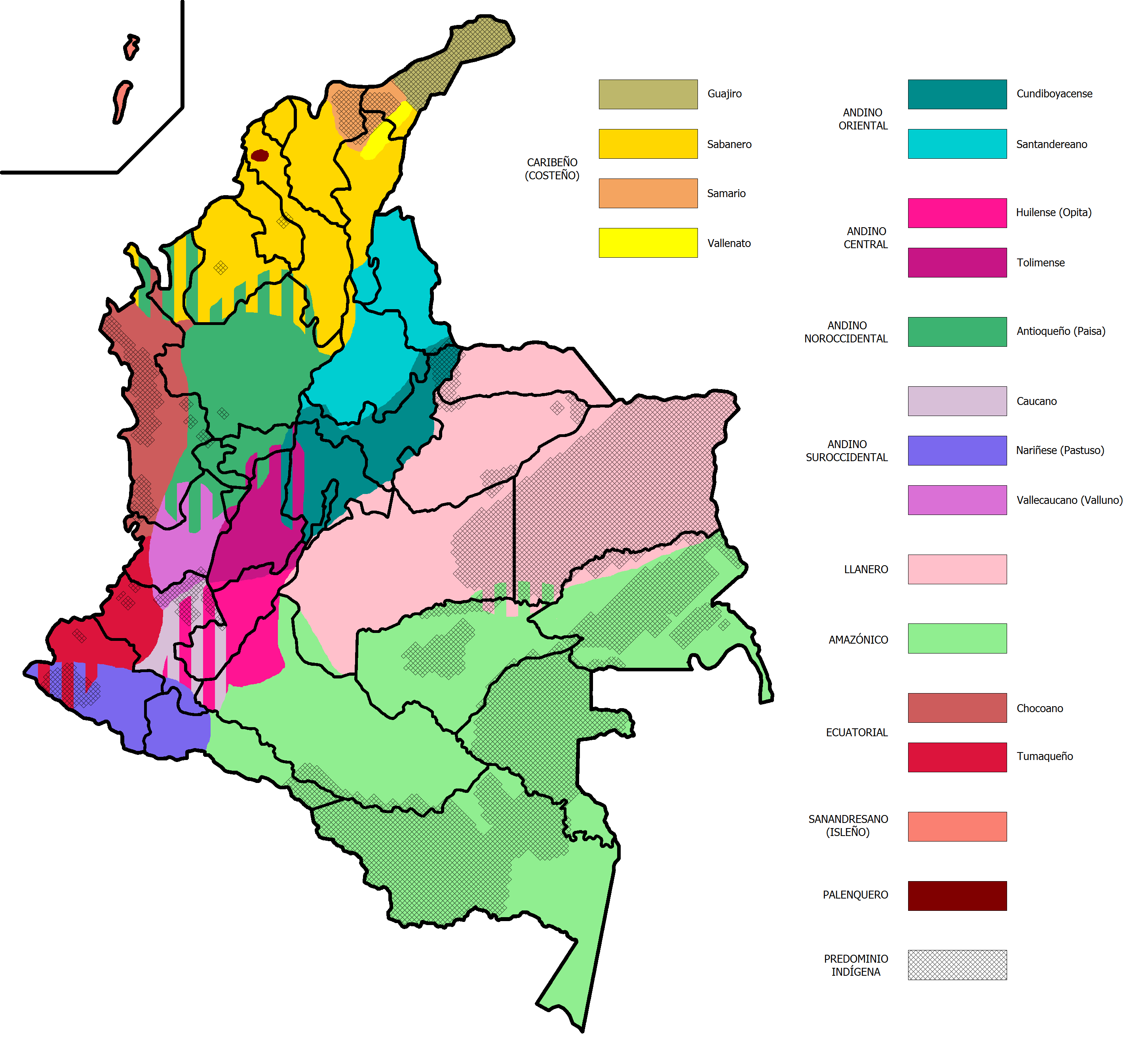
- Dialectical map of Colombian Spanish
- Official: Spanish
- Indigenous: Arawakan languages, Barbacoan languages, Bora–Witoto languages, Cariban languages, Chibchan languages, Choco languages, Guajiboan languages, Nadahup languages, Quechuan languages, Piaroa–Saliban languages, Tucanoan languages; Andoque, Ticuna, Kamëntsá, Cofán, Páez,
- Vernacular: Colombian Spanish, San Andrés-Providencia Creole, English, Palenquero, Andean Spanish, Amazonic Spanish, Equatorial Spanish
- Minority: Roma, Portuguese
- Foreign: French
- Signed: Colombian Sign Language, Providence Island Sign Language, Equatorial Spanish
- Keyboard layout: Spanish Latinamerican QWERTY

Around 99.2% of Colombians speak the Spanish language. Sixty-five Amerindian languages, two Creole languages, the Portuguese language and the Roma language are also spoken in the country. English has official status in the San Andrés, Providencia and Santa Catalina Islands. Since the 1930s 23 April had been declared as an Observance Language Day, to commemorate all languages spoken in the country.

The majority of Colombians speak Spanish (see also Colombian Spanish), but in total 90 languages are listed for Colombia in the Ethnologue database. The specific number of spoken languages varies slightly since some authors consider as different languages what others consider to be varieties or dialects of the same language. Best estimates recorded 71 languages that are spoken in the country today—most of which belong to the Chibchan, Tucanoan, Bora–Witoto, Guajiboan, Arawakan, Cariban, Barbacoan, and Saliban language families. There are currently about 850,000 speakers of native languages, however it is estimated to be higher.

Sixty-five indigenous languages that exist today can be regrouped into 12 language families and 10 language isolates, not yet classified.

The languages are: the great linguistic family Chibchan, of probable Central American origin; the great South American families Arawakan, Cariban, Quechuan and Tupian; seven families only present at the regional level (Chocó, Guahibo, Saliba, Nadahup, Witoto, Bora, Tucano). The ten isolated languages are: Andoque, Awa Pit, Cofán, Misak, Kamentsá, Páez, Ticuna, Tinigua, Yagua, Yaruro.

There are also two Creole languages spoken in the country. The first is San Andrés Creole, which is spoken alongside English in the San Andrés, Providencia, and Catalina insular regions of Colombia. It is related to and mutually intelligible with many other English-based Creole languages (also known as Patois/Patwa) spoken in West Indian and Caribbean islands, although San Andres Creole (which is also sometimes called Saint Andrewan or Bende) has had more Spanish influence.

The second Creole language is called Palenquero. During the days of Spanish colonization, hundreds of thousands of African slaves were brought to Colombia via the Atlantic Coast. Some of these slaves were able to escape, and many of them fled inland and created walled cities known as palenques. Some of these palenques grew very large, holding hundreds of people, and they all developed their own creole languages, developing similarly to Haitian Creole. In the early 1600s, the King of Spain began sending his armies to crush the palenques and send their inhabitants to slavery. Most of the palenques fell, and their languages went extinct, but with one exception: San Basilio de Palenque. San Basilio successfully repelled Spanish attacks for almost 100 years, until 1721, when it was declared a Free City. Any slave who ran away and successfully made it to San Basilio was considered a free man. The creole language spoken in San Basilio de Palenque is called Palenquero and it has survived to this day.

== Classification ==
Some 80 languages of Colombia, grouped into 11 families are classified. Also appear isolated or unclassified languages. Extinct languages are indicated by the sign †.

Classification of the indigenous languages of Colombia
Language family	Group		Language	Territory
Arawakan languages	Northern Arawak		Wayuunaiki	La Guajira
Arawakan languages	Northern Arawak		Achagua	Meta
Arawakan languages	Northern Arawak		Kurripako	Içana River
Arawakan languages	Northern Arawak		Cabiyari	Mirití-Paraná River
Arawakan languages	Northern Arawak		Maipure †	Vichada
Arawakan languages	Northern Arawak		Piapoco	Guainía, Vichada, Meta
Barbacoan languages	Awan		Awa Pit	Nariño
Barbacoan languages	Awan		Barbacoa †	Nariño
Barbacoan languages	Awan		Pasto †	Nariño
Barbacoan languages	Awan		Sindagua †	Nariño
Barbacoan languages	Coconucan		Coconucan †	Cauca
Barbacoan languages	Coconucan		Guambiano	Cauca
Barbacoan languages	Coconucan		Totoró †	Cauca
Bora–Witoto languages	Bora		Bora	Amazonas
Bora–Witoto languages	Bora		Miraña	Amazonas
Bora–Witoto languages	Bora		Muinane	Amazonas
Bora–Witoto languages	Witoto		Meneca-Murui	Amazonas
Bora–Witoto languages	Witoto		Nonuya	Amazonas
Bora–Witoto languages	Witoto		Ocaina	Amazonas
Cariban languages	Northern	Coastal	Yukpa	Cesar
Cariban languages	Northern	Coastal	Opón-carare †	Santander
Cariban languages	Southern	Southeast Colombia	Carijona	Amazonas, Guaviare
Chibchan languages	Magdalénico	Arhuaco	Ika (arhuaco)	Cesar, Magdalena
Chibchan languages	Magdalénico	Arhuaco	Kankuí †	Cesar
Chibchan languages	Magdalénico	Arhuaco	Kogui	Magdalena
Chibchan languages	Magdalénico	Arhuaco	Tayrona	Magdalena, La Guajira, Cesar
Chibchan languages	Magdalénico	Arhuaco	Wiwa	Cesar
Chibchan languages	Magdalénico	Cundicocúyico	Duit †	Boyacá
Chibchan languages	Magdalénico	Cundicocúyico	Muisca †	Cundinamarca, Boyacá
Chibchan languages	Magdalénico	Cundicocúyico	Guane †	Santander
Chibchan languages	Magdalénico	Cundicocúyico	Tunebo	ARA, BOY, NSA, SAN
Chibchan languages	Magdalénico	Barí	Barí	Cesar, Norte de Santander
Chibchan languages	Magdalénico	Chimila	Chimila	Magdalena
Chibchan languages	Ístmico	Guna	Guna	Gulf of Urabá, Atrato River
Choco languages	Embera		Embera	Pacific/Chocó natural region
Choco languages	Waunana		Wounaan	Chocó, Cauca, Valle del Cauca
Guajiboan languages	Northern		Hitnü	Arauca
Guajiboan languages	Northern		Hitanü	Arauca
Guajiboan languages	Central		Sikuani (Guahibo)	Meta, Vichada, Arauca, Guainía, Guaviare
Guajiboan languages	Central		Cuiba	Casanare, Vichada, Arauca
Guajiboan languages	Southern		Guayabero	Meta, Guaviare
Indo-European languages	Romance	West Iberian	Spanish	Nationwide
Indo-European languages	Romance	West Iberian	Portuguese	Guainía, Vaupés, Amazonas
Indo-European languages	Germanic	Anglic	English	San Andrés and Providence Island
Indo-European languages	Indo-Iranian	Indic	Romani	Main cities
Nadahup languages	Northern	Kakwa-Nukak	Kakwa	Papuri and lower Vaupés rivers
Nadahup languages	Northern	Kakwa-Nukak	Nukak	Guaviare
Nadahup languages	Northern	Puninave	Puinave	Guainía
Nadahup languages	Nadajup	Jup	Yujup	Japurá and Tiquié rivers
Nadahup languages	Nadajup	Jup	Jupda	Papuri and Tiquié rivers
Quechuan languages	Peripheral Quechua	Chinchay (Q II-B)	Quichua norteño	Cauca, Nariño, Putumayo
Piaroa–Saliban languages	Saliban		Saliban	Arauca, Casanare
Piaroa–Saliban languages	Piaroa		Piaroa	Vichada
Tucanoan languages	Western	Northwest	Koreguaje	Orteguaza River
Tucanoan languages	Western	Northwest	Siona	Putumayo River
Tucanoan languages	Central	North	Cubeo	Vaupés, Cuduyarí; Querarí, Pirabotón
Tucanoan languages	Central	South	Tanimuca	Guacayá, Mirití; Oikayá, Aporis
Tucanoan languages	Eastern	North	Piratapuya	Papurí
Tucanoan languages	Eastern	North	Tucano	Papurí, Caño Paca
Tucanoan languages	Eastern	North	Wanano	Vaupés
Tucanoan languages	Eastern	Central	Bará	Colorado, Fríjol; Lobo, Tiquié
Tucanoan languages	Eastern	Central	Desano	Vaupés
Tucanoan languages	Eastern	Central	Siriano	Vaupés
Tucanoan languages	Eastern	Central	Tatuyo	Vaupés
Tucanoan languages	Eastern	Central	Tuyuca	Tiquié
Tucanoan languages	Eastern	Central	Yurutí	Vaupés
Tucanoan languages	Eastern	South	Barasana	Vaupés
Tucanoan languages	Eastern	South	Carapana	Vaupés
Tucanoan languages	Eastern	South	Macuna	Vaupés
Language isolate			Andoque	Japurá River
Language isolate			Ticuna	Leticia, Puerto Nariño
Language isolate			Betoi †	Casanare
Language isolate			Camsá	Putumayo
Language isolate			Cofán	Nariño, Putumayo
Language isolate			Tinigua-pamigua †	Meta, Caquetá
Unclassified language			Paez	Cauca, Huila, Valle del Cauca
Unclassified language			Andaquí †	Caquetá
Unclassified language			Colima †	Cundinamarca
Unclassified language			Malibú †	Tamalameque, Tenerife
Unclassified language			Mocana †	Cartagena de Indias
Unclassified language			Muzo †	Cundinamarca
Unclassified language			Panche †	Cundinamarca
Unclassified language			Pijao	Tolima
Unclassified language			Yarí	Caquetá
Unclassified language			Yurí	Amazonas

== Sign languages ==
- Colombian Sign Language

== See also ==
- Antioquian languages
- Colombian Spanish
