= List of endangered languages in Colombia =

Language Endangerment Status by UNESCO Atlas of the World's Languages in Danger category

Extinct (EX)
- Extinct (EX): (lists)

Endangered
- Critically Endangered (CR); Severely Endangered (SE); Definitely Endangered (DE); Vulnerable (VU): (list); (list); (list); (list)

Safe
- Safe (NE): no list
- Other categories
- Revived (RE); Constructed (CL): (list); (list)
- Related topics: Atlas of the World's Languages in Danger; Endangered Languages Project; Ethnologue; Unclassified language; List of languages by total number of speakers
- UNESCO Atlas of the World's; Languages in Danger categories

An endangered language is a language that it is at risk of falling out of use, generally because it has few surviving speakers. If it loses all of its native speakers, it becomes an extinct language. UNESCO defines four levels of language endangerment between "safe" (not endangered) and "extinct":

- Vulnerable
- Definitely endangered
- Severely endangered
- Critically endangered

== Languages ==
Languages classified as endangered in Colombia in 2010
Language	Status	Comments	ISO 639-3
A'ingae, Cofán language	Severely endangered		con
Achagua language	Severely endangered		aca
Andoke language	Severely endangered		ano
Aruaco language	Vulnerable		arh
Awa Cuaiquer language	Critically endangered		kwi
Baníwa do Içana language	Vulnerable	Also spoken in: Brazil, Venezuela	bwi
Bara language	Critically endangered		pok, bao
Barasana language	Critically endangered		bsn
Barí language	Vulnerable		mot
Bora language	Vulnerable	Also spoken in: Peru	boa
Cabiyarí language	Critically endangered		cbb
Cacua language	Severely endangered		cbv
Camsá language	Definitely endangered		kbh
Carapana language	Definitely endangered		cbc
Carijona language	Critically endangered		cbd
Chimila language	Severely endangered		cbg
Cubeo language	Vulnerable		cub
Cuiba language	Severely endangered	Also spoken in: Venezuela	cui
Damana language	Definitely endangered		mbp
Desano language	Definitely endangered		des
Embera language	Vulnerable		emp, cmi, cto, sja, bdc, tdc, crf
Guajiro language	Vulnerable	Also spoken in: Venezuela	guc
Guambiano language	Definitely endangered		gum
Guayabero language	Definitely endangered		guo
Huitoto language	Definitely endangered	Also spoken in: Peru	hto, huu, hux
Hupda language	Definitely endangered		jup
Inga language	Severely endangered		inb, inj
Jitnu language	Definitely endangered		mbn
Kogui language	Vulnerable		kog
Koreguaje language	Definitely endangered		coe
Guna language	Severely endangered		kvn, cuk
Kurripako language	Definitely endangered	Also spoken in: Venezuela	kpc
Macuna language	Definitely endangered		myy
Miraña language	Severely endangered		boa
Muinane language	Definitely endangered		bmr
Nonuya language	Critically endangered		
Nukak language	Definitely endangered		mbr
Ocaina language	Severely endangered		oca
Páez language	Definitely endangered		pbb
Palenque Creole language	Definitely endangered		pln
Piapoko language	Definitely endangered	Also spoken in: Venezuela	pio
Piaroa language	Definitely endangered		pid
Piratapuya language	Critically endangered		pir
Pisamira language	Critically endangered		tuo
Puinave language	Definitely endangered	Also spoken in: Venezuela	pui
Romani language	Vulnerable		
Sáliba language	Severely endangered	Also spoken in: Venezuela	slc
San Andres Creole language	Vulnerable		icr
Sikuani language	Vulnerable	Also spoken in: Venezuela	guh, gob
Siona / Secoya language	Critically endangered		sey, snn
Siriano language	Definitely endangered		sri
Tanimuca-Letuama language	Severely endangered		tnc
Tariana language	Critically endangered		tae
Tatuyo language	Definitely endangered		tav
Ticuna language	Definitely endangered	Also spoken in: Brazil, Peru	tca
Tinigua language	Critically endangered		tit
Totoró language	Critically endangered		ttk
Tucano language	Vulnerable		tuo
Tunebo language	Definitely endangered	Also spoken in: Venezuela	tnd, tbn, tuf, tnb
Tuyuca language	Definitely endangered		tue
Wanano / Kotiria language	Definitely endangered		gvc
Waunana language	Vulnerable		noa
Yucuna language	Definitely endangered		ycn
Yuhup language	Definitely endangered		yab
Yurutí language	Definitely endangered		yui
