= List of endangered languages in Brazil =

Language Endangerment Status by UNESCO Atlas of the World's Languages in Danger category

Extinct (EX)
- Extinct (EX): (lists)

Endangered
- Critically Endangered (CR); Severely Endangered (SE); Definitely Endangered (DE); Vulnerable (VU): (list); (list); (list); (list)

Safe
- Safe (NE): no list
- Other categories
- Revived (RE); Constructed (CL): (list); (list)
- Related topics: Atlas of the World's Languages in Danger; Endangered Languages Project; Ethnologue; Unclassified language; List of languages by total number of speakers
- UNESCO Atlas of the World's; Languages in Danger categories

An endangered language is a language that it is at risk of falling out of use, generally because it has few surviving speakers. If it loses all of its native speakers, it becomes an extinct language. UNESCO defines four levels of language endangerment between "safe" (not endangered) and "extinct":

- Vulnerable
- Definitely endangered
- Severely endangered
- Critically endangered

== Languages ==
Brazil
| Language | Status | Comments | ISO 639-3 |
|---|---|---|---|
| Aikana language | Definitely endangered | | tba |
| Ajuru language | Extinct | | wyr |
| Akawaio language | Vulnerable | | ake |
| Akuntsu language | Critically endangered | | aqz |
| Akwáwa language | Vulnerable | | mdz, pak, asu |
| Anambé language | Critically endangered | | aan |
| Apalai language | Vulnerable | | apy |
| Apiaká language | Critically endangered | | api |
| Apinajé language | Vulnerable | | apn |
| Apurinã language | Definitely endangered | | apu |
| Arara do Pará language | Vulnerable | | aap |
| Arára Shawãdáwa language | Critically endangered | | knt |
| Araweté language | Vulnerable | | awt |
| Arikapu language | Critically endangered | | ark |
| Aruá language | Severely endangered | | arx |
| Ashaninka language | Vulnerable | | cjo, cni, cpb, cpc, cpu, cpy, prq |
| Asurini do Xingu language | Vulnerable | | asn |
| Aurê-Aurá language | Critically endangered | | aux |
| Ava-Canoeiro language | Critically endangered | | avv |
| Aweti language | Vulnerable | | awe |
| Bakairi language | Vulnerable | | bkq |
| Banawá Yafi language | Vulnerable | | jaa |
| Baníwa do Içana language | Vulnerable | Also spoken in: Colombia, Venezuela | bwi |
| Bara language | Vulnerable | | pok, bao |
| Barasana language | Severely endangered | | bsn |
| Baré language | Critically endangered | | bae, mht |
| Bororo language | Definitely endangered | | bor |
| Carapana language | Severely endangered | | cbc |
| Cashinahua language | Vulnerable | | cbs |
| Chamacoco language | Critically endangered | Also spoken in: Paraguay | ceg |
| Chiquitano language | Critically endangered | | cax |
| Cinta Larga language | Vulnerable | | cin |
| Cocama-Cocamilla language | Critically endangered | | cod |
| Cubeo language | Definitely endangered | | cub |
| Culina language | Vulnerable | | cul |
| Dâw language | Vulnerable | | kwa |
| Dení language | Vulnerable | | dny |
| Desano language | Definitely endangered | | des |
| Diahói language | Critically endangered | | pah |
| Djeoromitxi language | Severely endangered | | jbt |
| Enawenê-Nawê language | Vulnerable | | unk |
| Galibi Marworno language | Vulnerable | | car |
| Gavião de Rondônia language | Vulnerable | | gvo |
| Gavião do Pará language | Vulnerable | | gvp |
| Guajá language | Vulnerable | | gvj |
| Guajajara language | Vulnerable | | gub |
| Guarasu language | Critically endangered | | psm |
| Guató language | Critically endangered | | gta |
| Hixkaryána language | Vulnerable | | hix |
| Hupda language | Vulnerable | | jup |
| Ikpeng language | Vulnerable | | txi |
| Iranxe language | Critically endangered | | irn |
| Jamamadí language | Vulnerable | | jaa |
| Jarawára language | Vulnerable | | jap |
| Javaé language | Definitely endangered | | kpj |
| Juma language | Critically endangered | | jua |
| Ka'apór language | Vulnerable | | urb |
| Kadiwéu language | Definitely endangered | | kbc |
| Kaingang language | Definitely endangered | | kgp |
| Kaiowá Guarani language | Vulnerable | | kgk, pta |
| Kaixána language | Critically endangered | | |
| Kalapalo language | Vulnerable | | kui |
| Kamaiurá language | Vulnerable | | kay |
| Kanela Apaniekra language | Vulnerable | | ram |
| Kanela Rankokamekra language | Vulnerable | | ram |
| Kanoê language | Critically endangered | | kxo |
| Karajá language | Vulnerable | | kpj |
| Kari'ña language | Definitely endangered | | car, ciy |
| Karipuna language | Definitely endangered | | kuq |
| Karipuna do Amapá language | Vulnerable | | kmv |
| Karitiana language | Vulnerable | | ktn |
| Karo language | Vulnerable | | arr |
| Katawixi language | Critically endangered | | xat |
| Katukina do Acre language | Severely endangered | | knt |
| Katukína-Kanamarí language | Vulnerable | | kav, knm |
| Katxuyana-Xikuyána language | Vulnerable | | kbb |
| Kaxarari language | Critically endangered | | ktx |
| Kayabi language | Vulnerable | | kyz |
| Kinikinau language | Critically endangered | | gqn |
| Kisêdjê language | Vulnerable | | suy |
| Korúbo language | Vulnerable | | xor |
| Krahô language | Vulnerable | | xra |
| Krenak language | Critically endangered | | kqq |
| Krikati language | Vulnerable | | xri |
| Kuikuro language | Vulnerable | | kui |
| Kujubim language | Critically endangered | | |
| Kulina Páno language | Severely endangered | | xpk |
| Kurripako language | Vulnerable | | kpc |
| Kuruáya language | Critically endangered | | kyr |
| Kwazá language | Critically endangered | | xwa |
| Machineri language | Vulnerable | | mpd |
| Macuna language | Vulnerable | | myy |
| Macushi language | Vulnerable | | mbc |
| Makurap language | Severely endangered | | mpu |
| Marúbo language | Vulnerable | | mzr |
| Matipu language | Critically endangered | | mzo |
| Matís language | Vulnerable | | mpq |
| Mawayana language | Critically endangered | Also spoken in: Suriname | mpw, mzx |
| Mawé language | Vulnerable | | mav |
| Maxakali language | Vulnerable | | mbl |
| Mayoruna language | Vulnerable | | mcf |
| Mbya Guarani language | Vulnerable | | gun |
| Mebengokre language | Vulnerable | | txu |
| Mehináku language | Vulnerable | | mmh |
| Miraña language | Critically endangered | | boa |
| Mirití Tapuia language | Critically endangered | | mmv |
| Mundurukú language | Vulnerable | | myu |
| Myky language | Vulnerable | | irn |
| Nadëb language | Definitely endangered | | mbj |
| Nahukwa language | Definitely endangered | | mzo |
| Nambiquara do Norte language | Vulnerable | | lkd, ltn, xtw, wmd |
| Nambiquara do Sul language | Vulnerable | | nab |
| Ñandeva Guarani language | Vulnerable | | nhd |
| Nheengatu / Yeral language | Severely endangered | | yrl |
| Ninam language | Vulnerable | | shb |
| Ofayé language | Critically endangered | | opy |
| Omagua language | Critically endangered | | omg |
| Oro Win language | Critically endangered | | orw |
| Paiter language | Vulnerable | | sru |
| Palikur language | Vulnerable | | plu |
| Panará language | Vulnerable | | kre |
| Pareci language | Definitely endangered | | pab |
| Parintintin language | Critically endangered | | pah |
| Patamona language | Vulnerable | | pbc |
| Paumarí language | Severely endangered | | pad |
| Pemon language | Vulnerable | | aoc |
| Pirahã language | Vulnerable | | myp |
| Piratapuya language | Severely endangered | | pir |
| Poyanawa language | Critically endangered | | pyn |
| Pukobyê language | Vulnerable | | gvp |
| Puruborá language | Critically endangered | | pur |
| Rikbaktsa language | Severely endangered | | rkb |
| Sabanê language | Critically endangered | | sae |
| Sakurabiat language | Severely endangered | | skf |
| Salamãy language | Critically endangered | | mnd |
| Sanema language | Vulnerable | | xsu |
| Shanenawa language | Vulnerable | | ywn |
| Siriano language | Vulnerable | | sri |
| Suruahá language | Vulnerable | | swx |
| Tapayuna language | Severely endangered | | suy |
| Tapirapé language | Vulnerable | | taf |
| Tariana language | Critically endangered | | tae |
| Tembé language | Severely endangered | | tqb |
| Tenharim language | Severely endangered | | pah |
| Terena language | Severely endangered | | ter |
| Ticuna language | Definitely endangered | Also spoken in: Colombia, Peru | tca |
| Trio language | Vulnerable | | tri |
| Trumai language | Critically endangered | | tpy |
| Tucano language | Vulnerable | | tuo |
| Tupari language | Definitely endangered | | tpr |
| Tuyuca language | Vulnerable | | tue |
| Uru-eu-au-au language | Vulnerable | | urz, adw |
| Waimiri-Atroarí language | Vulnerable | | atr |
| Waiwai language | Vulnerable | | waw |
| Wajãpi language | Vulnerable | | oym |
| Wanano / Kotiria language | Vulnerable | | gvc |
| Wapishana language | Definitely endangered | | wap |
| Warekena language | Critically endangered | | gae |
| Wari language | Definitely endangered | | pav |
| Wauja language | Vulnerable | | wau |
| Wayana language | Vulnerable | | way |
| Xambioá language | Critically endangered | | kpj |
| Xavante language | Vulnerable | | xav |
| Xerente language | Severely endangered | | xer |
| Xetá language | Critically endangered | | xet |
| Xipáya language | Critically endangered | | xiy |
| Xokleng language | Critically endangered | | xok |
| Yaminahua language | Vulnerable | | yaa |
| Yanomám language | Vulnerable | | wca |
| Yanomami language | Vulnerable | | wck |
| Yatê language | Severely endangered | | fun |
| Yawalapiti language | Critically endangered | | yaw |
| Yawanawá language | Vulnerable | | ywn |
| Yecuana language | Vulnerable | | mch |
| Yudja language | Vulnerable | | jur |
| Yuhup language | Vulnerable | | yab |
| Zo'é language | Vulnerable | | pto |
| Zoró language | Vulnerable | | gvo |
