= Maijiki =

Tucanoan language of Peru

- Koto, Orejón
- Máíhɨ̃ki
- Native to: Peru
- Ethnicity: 400 Maijuna (2015)
- Native speakers: 70 (2018)
- Language family: Tucanoan: West; Napo; Maijiki

Language codes
- ISO 639-3: ore
- Glottolog: orej1242
- ELP: Orejón
- Orejón is classified as Severely Endangered by the UNESCO Atlas of the World's Languages in Danger.

Maijiki (Maihiki), also Coto, Orejón (Oregon), or Máíhɨ̃ki, is a moribund Tucanoan language of Peru, spoken by the Maijuna.

== Classification ==
Maijiki is a member of the Western branch of the Tucanoan language family, along with the living languages Siona, Secoya, and Koreguaje, as well as the extinct Teteté, Tama, and Macaguaje. The Western Tucanoan affiliation of Maijiki was first proposed by John Alden Mason (1950), who grouped it within the "Coto" subgroup. Nathan Waltz and Alva Wheeler (1972) propose that Maijiki was the first to split off from Western Tucanoan, as does Thiago Chacon (2014), whereas Amalia Skilton (2013) groups Maijiki as closer with Siona-Secoya instead.

== Geographic distribution ==
The Maijuna primarily live along the Yanayacu, Sucusari, and Algodón Rivers. Some of them have moved to the cities of Mazán, San Antonio del Estrecho, and Iquitos.

== Dialects ==
Three broad dialect groups are distinguished in Maijiki, Western, Northern and Eastern Maijiki.

== Status ==
Maijiki is spoken by about 80 to 90 people, out of 400 Maijuna people. All speakers are bilingual in Spanish, and the speech of younger speakers diverges from that of older speakers in both phonological and morphosyntactic aspects. Language transmission among the Maijuna stopped in the 1970s as a result of an influx of mestizos to their communities. The language continues to be used in all aspects of life, and a few infants were reported to be acquiring Maijiki from the oldest speakers. The youngest generation was reported to be "enthusiastic" about speaking Maijiki.

== Phonology ==
=== Vowels ===
	Front	Central	Back
Close	i	ɨ	u
Mid	e		o
Open		a	

All vowels have nasal allophones.

=== Consonants ===
		Bilabial	Alveolar	Palatal	Velar		Labiovelar	Glottal
		Bilabial	Alveolar	Palatal	plain	lab.	Labiovelar	Glottal
Occlusive	Voiceless	p	t		k	kʷ		
Occlusive	Voiced	b	d		g	(gʷ)		
Affricate	Voiceless			tʃ				
Affricate	Voiced			dʒ				
Fricative			s					h
Semivowel							w	

Voiced stops have nasalized allophones. /gʷ/ is exclusive to the Western and Northern dialects.

=== Tone ===
Maijiki, along with Koreguaje, are the only two living languages of the Western Tucanoan branch to have contrastive tone. Tone in the Northern dialect is described as "systematically different" from all other dialects. Two tone heights, high (H) and low (L) tone, are distinguished. Three basic tone shapes in roots (HH, HL, and LL) are distinguished. The mora is the basic tone-bearing unit. Both nominal and verbal roots are almost entirely bimoraic.

== Writing system ==
Orejón alphabet
a	a̱	b	ch	d	e	e̱	g	i	i̱	ɨ	ɨ̱	j	k	m	n	ñ	o	o̱	p	r	s	t	u	u̱	w	y

The letters ⟨a̱, e̱, i̱, ɨ, ɨ̱, o̱, u̱⟩ can also be written as ⟨â, ê, î, ü, ï, ô, û⟩ in the National Register of Identity and Civil Status of Peru.

Nasal vowels have an underlined stroke and tones are indicated using diacritics:

- low-tone vowels with the grave accent ⟨à è ì ɨ̀ ò ù⟩;
- high-tone vowels with the acute accent ⟨á é í ɨ́ ó ú⟩;
- low-tone nasal vowels with the macron below and grave accent ⟨à̱ è̱ ì̱ ɨ̱̀ ò̱ ù̱⟩;
- high-tone nasal vowels with the macron below and acute accent ⟨á̱ é̱ í̱ ɨ̱́ ó̱ ú̱⟩.
