= Tetete =

Teteté may refer to:

- Teteté people of the Acuadorian Amazon
- Teteté language, a Tucanoan language
