= Yauna =

Yauna refers to variously

- a Tucanoan language spoken in Colombia: Yauna language
- an alternation spelling of Yona
- — Old Persian name of the Ionians and Greeks, extended from the name Ionia, see names of the Greeks.
