= Koreguaje =

Indigenous people of Colombia

The Koreguaje, also known as Korebaju people are an Indigenous people of Colombia who speak the Koreguaje language.

== Description and history ==
The Koreguaje people are an Indigenous people who live along the Orteguaza River in the Caquetá Department in Colombia. The Muina-Murui (Huitoto) communities are their neighbours along the Caquetá River. In 1948 the "Correguaje" tribe was recorded as inhabiting "a number of villages on the Oretguaza River in Colombia (lat. 1° N., long. 75° W.), and were categorized as one of five groups of Western Tucanoan-speaking peoples, who were "apparently closely linked" with the "Tama (Tamao)" people, on the same river.

The traditional lands of the Koreguaje tribe used to stretch all the way to Florencia, but today fewer than 2,000 Koreguaje remain on their lands, after a history of forced enslavement, Christianization, land grabbing, and displacement, since the 18th century. After the development of the cocaine trade, increasing violence, and dispossession of their land in the 1990s and early 2000s, some moved to slums of Florencia and Bogotá.

The Koreguaje have an intimate relationship with the forest, seeing themselves as not merely its protectors, but part of the forest. They refer to themselves and their language as "Korébajü", meaning "people of the earth". They have traditionally sourced their food through fishing, occasional hunting, and a type of subsistence slash-and-burn agriculture common to Amazonian tribes known as chagras. They rely on the river for transport to other places.

== Language ==
The Koreguaje people speak a language known as the Koreguaje language.

== Threats and mitigation ==
Deforestation has been occurring at a rapid rate in this department for years, with pastures and coca plantations now covering vast tracts of land. In addition, oil companies have been given licences to explore in the region, and illegal gold mining also takes place. Another tendency which has threatened all of the indigenous people of Columbia is the concentration of arable land in the hands of very few wealth landowners.

Along with other indigenous peoples of the Amazon basin, the Koreguaje's lifestyle and existence is also threatened by climage change, which is causing more intense rainfall and longer dry seasons. With fewer trees to absorb rainfall, droughts and floods have more extreme effects, and the deforested river banks lead to faster erosion.

Some indigenous peoples are partnering with The Nature Conservancy Colombia to implement solutions "based on nature and indigenous knowledge systems".
