= Hypostomus niceforoi =

Conservation status
- Data Deficient (IUCN 3.1)

Scientific classification
- Kingdom: Animalia
- Phylum: Chordata
- Class: Actinopterygii
- Order: Siluriformes
- Family: Loricariidae
- Genus: Hypostomus
- Species: H. niceforoi

Binomial name
- Hypostomus niceforoi (Fowler, 1943)

Synonyms
- Hemiancistrus niceforoi Fowler, 1943

Species of fish

Hypostomus niceforoi is a species of suckermouth armored catfish. H. niceforoi reaches 13.5 cm (5.3 inches) SL and is believed to be a facultative air-breather.

== Taxonomic history ==
This species was described by Henry Weed Fowler in 1943. The holotype was donated to the Academy of Natural Sciences of Philadelphia by Brother Nicéforo María, after whom the specific name is named. Its type locality is Florencia, Colombia, in the Orteguaza River. Fowler placed the species in the genus Hemiancistrus. Isaäc J. H. Isbrücker transferred this species to Hypostomus in 1980.

== Distribution ==
This species occurs in the Japurá River basin in South America. A fish labeled Hypostomus cf. niceforoi has been found in Nicaragua; it is thought their introduction to Lake Nicaragua as an invasive species is due to the aquarium trade. H. cf. niceforoi have also been found in the San Marcos River, Texas.
