= Sura language =

Sura language may refer to:

- Mwaghavul language (Nigeria)
- Surjapuri language (India)
- Tatuyo language (Colombia)
