= Sina language =

Sina may be

- Tatuyo language
- Shina language
- a dialect of Kamwe language
