= Siriano =

Indigenous people of Colombia and Brazil

Siriano (also called "Selea" or "Sürá") are a Tucanoan people Indigenous to Colombia and Brazil. Their total population is estimated at 750, with most living in Colombia. Their exogamous culture means that, glossologically, speakers are identified by the first language of their father. The Siriano language is Tucanoan.
