= Yupuá–Duriña language =

Extinct Tucanoan language

Yupuá–Duriña
- Hiupiá, Sokó
- Native to: Colombia
- Extinct: late 20th century
- Language family: Tucanoan: Eastern; Central; Yupuá–Duriña
- Dialects: Yupuá; Duriña

Language codes
- ISO 639-3: None (mis)
- Glottolog: jupu1235

Yupuá (Jupua, Hiupiá) and Duriña (Sokó) are dialects of an extinct Eastern Tucanoan language from Colombia.

== Vocabulary ==
gloss	Duriña	Yupuá	gloss	Duriña	Yupuá
tree	dyámpáö	yábu	black	níimásö	ñí
white	bûgö	bóle	eye	díoƚö	yãkõá
dog	dí máča	dyi masa	bird	miƚa	šagá
crocodile	áuri	yáli	ear	náhmu	ngáma
tooth	gópaika	goxpéga	parrot	mógo	bógo
star	yokoƚo	yoxkóƚo	small	tígö	siádya
woman	núni	nomōa	foot	goapi	göapö
fire	píƚo	píeƚe	fish	wái	uái
large	páhö	pahatia	sun	áwe	aué
axe	kúmi	kúmi	tobacco	möƚa	méla
jaguar	dí wórekö	yí	tapir	wíkö	uigö
moon	awe	yamínage-aue	head	kúɛrɛ	kúeƚe
hand	móhu	múho	1	čum	čundyá
corn	óho	óo	2	apáina	axpedyá
to eat	beau	báai	3	áaƚiã	aƚadyá
