= Tama language (Colombia) =

Extinct indigenous Tucanoan language of Colombia

Tama
- Native to: Colombia
- Region: Orteguaza River
- Ethnicity: Tama
- Extinct: (date missing)
- Language family: Tucanoan: Western; Koreguaje–Tama; Tama

Language codes
- ISO 639-3: ten
- Glottolog: tama1340

Tama is an extinct indigenous Tucanoan language of Colombia. It was spoken in the regions of Vicente, Orteguaza River and Caquetá Region.

== Vocabulary ==
Tama vocabulary
gloss	Tama
knife	ouati
two	eachapa
water	oko
fire	toa
axe	soupo
moon	païcouchi
mountain	yaïro
basket	touroupoui
sun	insi
jaguar	echaï
one	téhé
