= Cueretú language =

Extinct language of the Amazon basin

Cueretú
- Curetu, Kueretú
- Region: Amazon river basin
- Ethnicity: Kueretú
- Extinct: (date missing)
- Language family: Tucanoan: (unclassified); Cueretú

Language codes
- ISO 639-3: None (mis)
- Glottolog: cure1236

Cueretú (Curetu) is an extinct language of the Amazon basin. It is a Tucanoan language.
