= Teteté people =

The Teteté were a small group of Western Tucanoan speakers, who once lived in the Ecuadorian Amazon or Oriente. Today, their territory would lie within Ecuador’s Cuyabeno Wildlife Reserve, a popular site for ecotourism. From 1877 through the 1920s, however, Ecuadorian and Colombian rubber collectors (caucheros) and their native press gangs worked this part of the upper Aguarico and Putumayo watersheds, shooting or kidnapping Tetete people whenever they showed themselves.Cabodevilla 1997 Sometime before 1940, most of the remaining Tetete were killed in a raid by neighboring Siona people. “On a sandbar, the two groups faced each other in long lines and began to fight. Very soon, the Siona won; a few Tetete escaped, others died, and several were wounded… Later, a Siona man found them fishing on Lake Cuyabeno, and they wounded him slightly in the shoulder… After that, we never saw them again.”Payaguaje 1994

When they were “rediscovered” by Catholic priests in 1966, only three elderly survivors remained. Their last contact with outsiders – an American Evangelical missionary and his Siona-Secoya translators – occurred in 1973.

== Legend of oil company extinction ==
Over the following years, a legend arose that the extinction was caused by oil companies, specifically naming Texaco. This was taken on widely in the press and by politicians and others. The emergence of this legend is examined in detail in 2011 in Nobody Knew Their Names: The Black Legend of Tetete Extermination by Wasserstrom et al.
