= Teteté language =

Language

Teteté
- Tetete
- Native to: Ecuador, Colombia
- Ethnicity: Teteté people
- Extinct: after 1980
- Language family: Tucanoan: Western; Napo; Siona–Secoya; Teteté

Language codes
- ISO 639-3: teb
- Glottolog: sion1247 Siona-Tetete tete1252 (retired)
- ELP: Teteté
- Tetete is classified as Extinct by the UNESCO Atlas of the World's Languages in Danger.

Teteté is an extinct Tucanoan language that was spoken in Ecuador close to the Ecuador-Colombia border. It was also formerly spoken in Colombia, but is now extinct in both countries. It was spoken by the indigenous Tetete people, who did not survive the twentieth century.

Tetete is close to the Secoya language.

== Bibliography ==
- Campbell, Lyle (1997). American Indian languages: the historical linguistics of native America. Oxford studies in anthropological linguistics. New York Oxford: Oxford university press. ISBN 978-0-19-509427-5.
