= Macaguaje language =

Tucanoan language of Colombia

Macaguaje
- Makabajë
- Native to: Colombia
- Region: Putumayo Department, Caquetá Department
- Ethnicity: 24 Macaguaje (2018 census)
- Native speakers: 1 (2024)
- Language family: Tucanoan: Western; Napo; Siona–Secoya?; Macaguaje

Language codes
- ISO 639-3: mcl
- Glottolog: maca1261
- ELP: Macaguaje
- Macaguaje is classified as Extinct by the UNESCO Atlas of the World's Languages in Danger.

Macaguaje (or Makabajë, water people) is a nearly extinct Tucanoan language of Colombia. As of 2024, there was one speaker of the language, who was working with educators to develop language documentation and a revitalization plan for Macaguaje. It is part of the Western Tucanoan language subfamily.

Macaguaje speakers lived along the Orteguaza River before moving to the tributaries of the Caquetá River in the 19th century. They were regarded as warriors and raiders by locals. Their population significantly declined after European contact, due in part to a dysentery epidemic.
