= Yahuna language =

Extinct Tucanoan language of Colombia

Yahuna
- Yauna
- Native to: Colombia
- Ethnicity: 110 (2018)
- Extinct: early 20th century
- Language family: Tucanoan: East; South; Yahuna

Language codes
- ISO 639-3: ynu
- Glottolog: yahu1241
- ELP: Yahuna

Yahuna (Yauna) is an extinct Tucanoan language of Colombia.
