= Tanimuca-Retuarã language =

Tucanoan language spoken in Colombia

Tanimuca-Retuarã
- Tanimuca-Letuama
- Wejeñememajã oka, Ũᵽairã oka
- Native to: Colombia
- Ethnicity: Tanimuca, Retuarã
- Native speakers: (300 cited 1976)
- Language family: Tucanoan: Eastern; Southern; Tanimuca-Retuarã
- Dialects: Tanimuca (Opaina); Retuarã

Language codes
- ISO 639-3: tnc
- Glottolog: tani1257
- ELP: Tanimuca-Retuarã
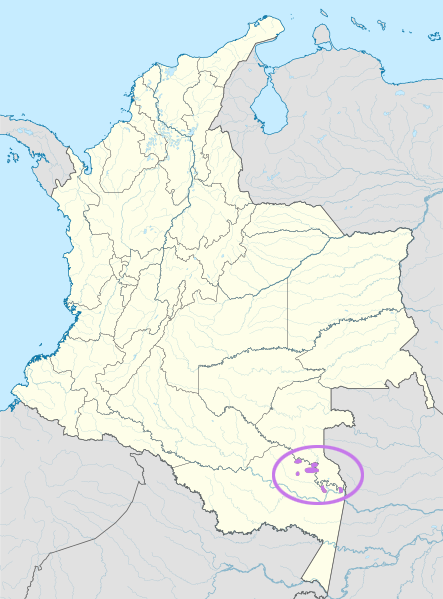

- Tanimuca-Letuama is classified as Severely Endangered by the UNESCO Atlas of the World's Languages in Danger

Tanimuca-Retuarã is a Tucanoan language of Colombia, spoken by 300 people of the Tanimuca and Retuarã, two Indigenous peoples of Colombia. Typologically, it exhibits a basic subject–object–verb word order and is predominantly suffixing. It has been heavily influenced by Yucuna, another language of the region and classified within the Arawakan language family. Despite the influence from Yucuna and neighbouring Macuna, "the language is still spoken on all occasions".

== History ==
=== Language contact ===
Tanimuca-Retuarã exhibits significant differences from other East Tucanoan languages. This is due to historical contact and influence from the Yucuna language, spoken nearby. The two languages exhibit significant phonological and morphological similarities between them, and their cultures also share various myths and oral history.

== Phonology ==
=== Consonants ===
		Bilabial	Alveolar	Palatal	Velar	Glottal
Stop	plain	(p)	t		k	ʔ
Stop	voiced	b	d	ɟ		
Fricative		ɸ	s			h
Trill			r			
Approximant		w		j		

Voiced stops /b d ɟ/ are nasalized to [m n ɲ] before nasal vowels. /r/ is also nasalized to a nasalized flap [ɾ̃] in the same environment (e.g. /riakarã/ realized as [riakaɾ̃ã]).

=== Vowels ===
	Front		Central		Back	
	plain	nasal	plain	nasal	plain	nasal
High	i	ĩ			u	ũ
Mid	e	ẽ			o	õ
Low			a	ã		

Vowel length is contrastive.

=== Suprasegmental features ===
Stress in Tanimuca-Retuarã is phonemic, or contrastive. Other East Tucanoan languages, of which Tanimuca-Retuarã is a member, maintain a tonal distinction instead, which Tanimuca-Retuarã has lost. This is due to influence from Yucuna, which has a similar distinction. An example of a minimal pair, pairs of words differing in only one phonological element, is ãʔã́ 'uncle' vs. ã́ʔã 'yes'. Stressed syllables are often pronounced with a higher pitch, and stressed vowels are typically lengthened.

=== Syllable structure ===
The basic syllable structure is (C)V, where C is a wildcard symbol for any consonant and V is a wildcard for any vowel. Closed syllables, in the form of *CVC, do not exist. (Note: The asterisk represents a form that cannot occur in the language.)

== Syntax ==
=== Word order ===
Tanimuca-Retuarã exhibits a subject-object-verb word order in main declarative clauses, as is illustrated by the examples below.

S O V
kle-re yiha-re eʔe-waʔ-rape
Clay-TERM 1PL-TERM get-AWAY-PST
Clay took us to Puerto Lleras.

The subject in the example above is a full noun phrase, but these are uncommon in discourse. Subject pronoun clitics are attached before the verb, making object–subject–verb (OSV) word order much more common.
