= Pisamira language =

Tucanoan language of South America

Pisamira
- Native to: Colombia
- Region: Vaupés Department
- Ethnicity: Pisamira
- Language family: Tucanoan: Eastern; Central; Tatuyo–Carapano; Pisamira

Language codes
- ISO 639-3: (covered by tuo Tucano)
- Glottolog: pisa1245
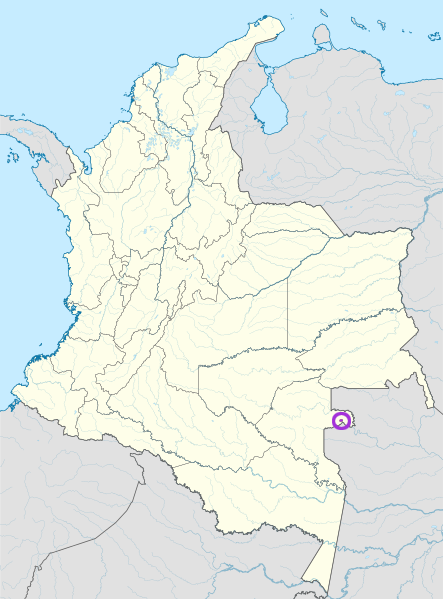

Pisamira is a Tucanoan language. Ethnologue classifies it as a dialect of Tucano.

== Phonology ==
=== Vowels ===
Pisamira features six vowels /a e i ɨ o u/ which can be either oral or nasal.

=== Consonants ===
Pisamira has eleven consonant phonemes. A few of these consonants /g, t͡ʃ, r/ have a restricted distribution and rarely or never appear at the beginnings of roots.

Pisamira consonant phonemes
		Labial	Apical	Palatal	Velar	Glottal
Stops	voiceless	p	t		k	
Stops	voiced	b	d		g	
Continuants		ʋ		ʝ		h
Affricates				t͡ʃ		
Trills			r			
