= Macaguán language =

Guahiban language of Colombia

Macaguán
- Hitnü
- Native to: Colombia
- Region: between the Lipa, Ele, and Cuiloto rivers
- Native speakers: 300 (2008)
- Language family: Guahiban: Macaguán

Language codes
- ISO 639-3: mbn
- Glottolog: maca1259
- ELP: Macaguán
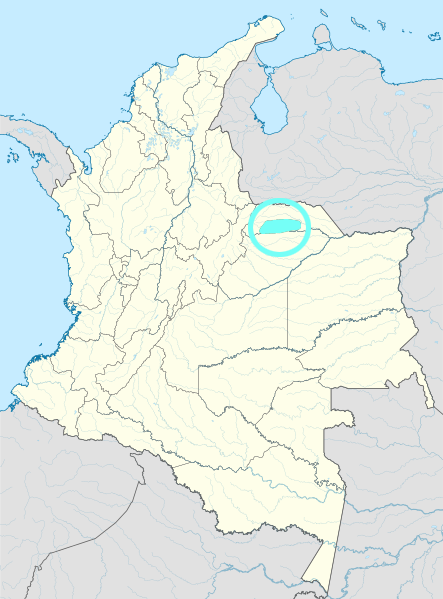

Macaguán (Hitnü) is a Guahiban language that was spoken by about 400 people in Colombia. Many of its speakers are monolingual.

It is spoken by the Hitnü on the La Vorágine and San José de Lipa indigenous reservations in the municipality of Arauca in Puerto Rondón.

== Phonology ==
Macaguán has 6 vowels, five of which can be nasalized, in addition to 16 consonants.

=== Vowels ===
| | Front | Central | Back |
|---|---|---|---|
| Close | i ĩ | ɨ (ʉ) | u ũ |
| Mid | e ẽ | | o õ |
| Open | | a ã | |

=== Consonants ===
| | | Bilabial | Dental | Lateral | Palatal | Velar | Glottal |
|---|---|---|---|---|---|---|---|
| Plosive | voiceless | p | t | | | k | ʔ |
| Plosive | voiced | b | | | | | |
| Fricative | | | s | | | | h |
| Affricate | | | t͡s | | tʃ (ch) | | |
| Nasal | | m | n | | | | |
| Liquid | | | r | ɾ | | | |
| Semivowel | | w | | | j (y) | | |
