= Wajiara language =

Tucanoan language spoken in South America

Yurutí
- Wajiara
- Native to: Colombia, Brazil
- Native speakers: 1,200 (2011)
- Language family: Tucanoan: Eastern; Central; Bara; Yurutí

Language codes
- ISO 639-3: yui
- Glottolog: yuru1263
- ELP: Yurutí
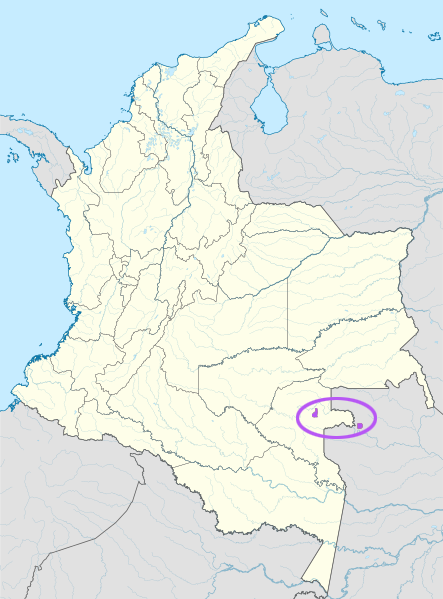

Yurutí, or Wajiara, is a Tucanoan language of Colombia, with around 1,200 speakers in Colombia and Brazil.

== Phonology ==
Consonants
| | | Bilabial | Alveolar | Palatal | Guttural |
|---|---|---|---|---|---|
| Plosive/ Affricate | voiceless | p | t | t͡ʃ | k |
| Plosive/ Affricate | voiced | b | d | d͡ʒ | ɡ |
| Fricative | | | | s | h |
| Semivowel | | w | | j | |
| Flap | | | ɾ | | |

Vowels
| | Front | Central | Back |
|---|---|---|---|
| Close | i | (ɨ) | u |
| Mid | e | | o |
| Open | | a | |
