= Tuyuca language =

Eastern Tucanoan language of Colombia and Brazil

Tuyuca
- Docapúaraye
- Native to: Colombia, Brazil
- Native speakers: 1,400 (2012)
- Language family: Tucanoan: Eastern; Central; Bara; Tuyuca

Language codes
- ISO 639-3: tue
- Glottolog: tuyu1244 Tuyuca
- ELP: Tuyuka
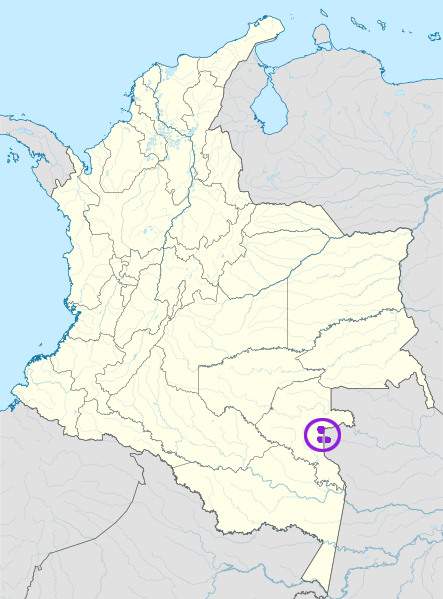

Tuyuca (also Dochkafuara, Tejuca, Tuyuka, Dojkapuara, Doxká-Poárá, Doka-Poara, or Tuiuca) is an Eastern Tucanoan language (similar to Tucano). Tuyuca is spoken by the Tuyuca, an indigenous ethnic group of some 500–1000 people, who inhabit the watershed of the Papuri River, the Inambú River, and the Tiquié River in Vaupés Department, Colombia, and Amazonas State, Brazil. Studies from the 1980s to 1990s noted that Tuyuca was spoken by fewer than 300 people in Colombia and 590 people in Brazil.

== Phonology ==
Tuyuca's consonants are /p t k b d ɡ s r w j h/, and its vowels are /i ɨ u e a o/, with syllable nasalization and pitch accent occurring as well.

=== Vowels ===
	Front	Central	Back
High	i	ɨ	u
Low	e	a	o

=== Consonants ===
		Labial	Coronal	Palatal	Velar
Obstruent	voiceless	p	t	s	k
Obstruent	voiced	b ~ m	d ~ n	dʒ ~ ɲ ~ j	ɡ ~ ŋ
Sonorant		w ~ w̃	ɺ ~ r ~ r̃	dʒ ~ ɲ ~ j	h ~ h̃

==== Minimal pairs ====
The following words show some of the consonant contrasts.

===== Bilabial contrasts =====
/pakó/ 'mom'
/bapá/ 'plate'
/wapá/ 'payment'

===== Alveolar contrasts =====
/botéa/ 'a fish'
/bodé/ 'dragonfly'
/bosé/ 'party'
/boré/ 'whitening'

Velar and palatal contrasts

/bɨkó/ 'ant-eater'
/bɨɡó/ 'aunt'
/hoó/ 'plantain'
/joó/ 'thread'

==== Variation ====
- Voiceless plosives /p, t, k/ have aspirated variants that tend to occur before high vowels but not near voiceless vowels. There are a few degrees of the amount of aspiration.
- Preglottalized variants of /b, d/ occur together at the onset.
  - Preglottalized forms of [m, w, w̃, j, j̃, ɲ, dʒ] occur in the onset and are in free variation with their plain counterparts.
- Prenasal variants of /b, d, ɡ/ occur after nasal vowels and before oral vowels: /kĩĩbai/ [kʰĩĩmbaii̥].

==== Nasal assimilation ====
- Voiced consonants /b, d, ɡ, r, w, j/ have nasal variants at the same place of articulation before nasal vowels: [m, n, ŋ, ɳ, w̃, j̃].
  - The /j/ can also surface as ɲ before high nasal vowels.
- The /h/ also has a nasalized variant that occurs before nasal vowels.

==== Nasal harmony ====
Segments in a word are either all nasal or all oral.

/waa/ 'to go'
/w̃ãã/ 'to illuminate' (the /w/ is nasal)

Note that voiceless segments are transparent.

/ãkã/ 'choke on a bone'
/w̃ãtĩ/ 'demon'

See further remarks regarding the oral/nasal nature of affixes in the Morphophonemics section.

=== Suprasegmental features ===
Tuyuca's two suprasegmental features are tone and nasalization.

==== Tone ====
There is a high tone (H) and a low tone (L) in Tuyuca. The phonological word has only one high tone, which may occur in any syllable of the word. The low tone has two variants: a mid-tone, which occurs in words with at least three syllables in free variation, and the low tone, which occurs in internal syllables that have [i] that is contiguous to the high tone but not preceded by a low tone.

- The accent is the same as high tone.
- The tone is contrastive in (C)VV syllables.

/díi/ 'blood'
/dií/ 'mud'

- (C)VCV words, except for loanwords, have the tone on the second syllable.

/eté/ 'parakeet'
/b̃ésa/ 'table' (← Portuguese 'mesa')

==== Nasalization ====
Nasalization is phonemic and operates at the root level.

/sĩã/ 'to kill'
/sia/ 'to tie'

=== Phonetic distribution and syllabic structure ===
A syllable is any unit that may take tone and has a vocalic nucleus, regardless of whether or not it has a consonant before it.

==== Restrictions ====
- /ɡ/ and /r/ do not occur word-initially
- /ɡu/ and /wu/ do not occur.
- No VV string starts with /u/.
- Multisyllabic VVV strings occur, but not all combinations of vowels are attested. /u/ is always last in such strings.
- (C)V may be optionally be pronounced with aspiration, with the same quality as the preceding vowel, when the syllable is both unstressed and before syllables with voiceless onsets.

=== Morphophonemics ===
All affixes are in one of the two classes:

1. Oral affixes that may undergo nasalization, like the plural morpheme -ri: /sopéri/ 'marks'
2. Affixes that are intrinsically oral or nasal and are not changed.

When a nasal CV suffix occurs and C is a continuant or a vibrant /r/, regressive nasalization is undergone by the preceding vowel.

== Grammar ==
=== Word order ===
Tuyuca is a postpositional agglutinative subject–object–verb language.

=== Evidentiality ===
Tuyuca has mandatory type II evidentiality. Five evidentiality paradigms are used: visual, nonvisual, apparent, second-hand, and assumed, but second-hand evidentiality exists only in the past tense, and apparent evidentiality does not occur in the first-person present tense.
