= Guayabero language =

Guahiban language of Colombia

Guayabero
- Jiw
- Native to: Colombia
- Region: Upper Guaviaré River
- Ethnicity: 1,120 (2011)
- Native speakers: 1,000 (2008)
- Language family: Guajiboan: Southwest; Guayabero

Language codes
- ISO 639-3: guo
- Glottolog: guay1257
- ELP: Guayabero
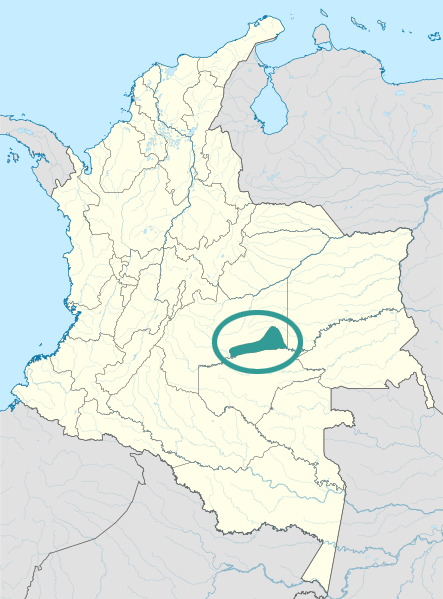

Guayabero is a Guahiban language that is spoken by a thousand people in Colombia. Many of its speakers are monoglots, with few fluent Spanish speakers in the population.

== Phonology ==
The Guayabero syllable structure can be represented as CV(V)(C)(C). Each syllable has an obligatory single consonant onset and a nucleus of one or two vowels. An optional coda of at most two consonants can occur in both word-medial and final positions.

Consonants
		Labial	Alveolar	Palatal	Velar	Glottal
Stop	voiceless	p	t		k	ʔ
Stop	voiced	b	d			
Affricate				t͡ʃ		
Fricative		ɸ	s		x	h
Nasal		m	n			
Approximant		w	l	j		
Flap			ɾ			

- /w/ is heard as labiodental [ʋ] when preceding front vowel sounds.
- /d/ can be heard as fricatives in syllable-final positions. As a voiced dental [ð] when after front vowels, and as a voiceless [θ] when after back vowels in syllable-final positions.
- /n/ is heard as [ɲ] when following front vowels and as [ŋ] when preceding velar /k/.
- /b/ is heard as preglottal [ˀb] in accented syllable-initial positions and as [β] in intervocalic positions.
- /s/ is also heard as postalveolar [ʃ] in syllable-final position in free variation.
- /x/ is heard as uvular [χ] in accented syllables.
- /j/ is heard as a stop [ɟ] in accented syllable-initial positions.

Vowels
	Front	Central	Back
High	i	ɨ	u
Mid	e		o
Low	æ	a	

- Vowels /i, e, ɨ, a, o, u/ are heard in unstressed position as [ɪ, ɛ, ɨ̞, ʌ, ɔ, ʊ].
