= Desano language =

Tucanoan language of Colombia and Brazil

Desano
- Winá, Wĩrã
- Native to: Colombia, Brazil
- Region: Amazonas
- Ethnicity: Desano
- Native speakers: (3,000 cited 2001-2012)
- Language family: Tucanoan: Eastern; Central; Desano–Siriano; Desano

Official status
- Official language in: Brazil (Amazonas)

Language codes
- ISO 639-3: des
- Glottolog: desa1247
- ELP: Desano
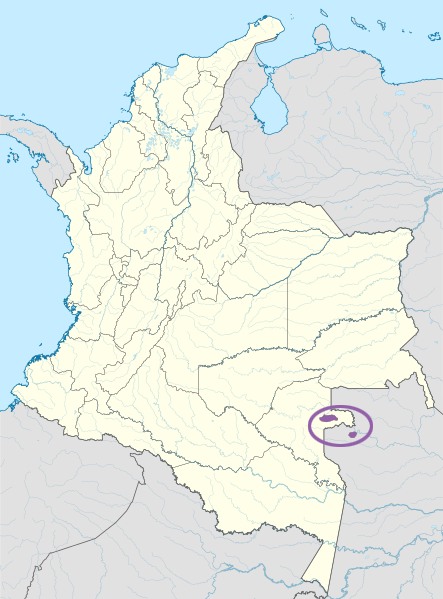

Desano (Desano: Wĩrã) is a Tucanoan language of Colombia and Brazil. There are several alternative names for Desano, including Boleka, Desâna, and Kusibi. It is spoken primarily in northwest Brazil and southern Colombia.

== Classification ==
The Desano language has a 90% lexical similarity with the Siriano language. The language is reported to have a form of whistled speech.

== Geographical distribution ==
The primary concentration of Desano people is by the Tiquié River in Brazil and Colombia. They also reside near the Papuri River, and their respective tributaries, and on the Vaupés river, which borders Brazil and Colombia, and Negro rivers, as well as in the cities within the area.

This region is populated by a number of other ethnic communities, most notably the Hup people, with whom they share several linguistic and cultural characteristics.

== Study ==
The earliest extensive linguistic study of Desano was conducted by Kaye in 1970. In his study, he systematically covered the semantics, phonetics, and syntax of the language. In his study, Kaye attempts to compare Desano, which he describes as “an undocumented language”, with the syntactic models from Noam Chomsky as an early way to formally document and access the syntactic patterns of Desano. Kaye has also outlined certain phonological features in Desano, namely nasal assimilation, vowel coalescence, and epenthesis. Years later, Chacon (2007) carried out a phonological-comparison project focusing on Tukano and Desano, which are sister languages within the same family. Chacon’s research has taken into consideration certain historical aspects of the land where each of the languages were spoken as an attempt to further study the impact of history on the language’s phonological aspects.

Years later, Silva (2012) carried out and published descriptive grammar research on Desano. Predominantly focusing on morphological rules and patterns, Silva has also outlined certain syntactic patterns of Desano in relation to the historical background of the language community. This includes the noun-classifier and evidentiality systems, outlined by Silva. Silva has also included certain notable phonological features of Desano, namely nasal-harmony, rarely found in other languages and previously studied by Kaye.

Similar in nature, but perhaps slightly different from a language-documentation project, Miller (1999) has conducted in-depth primary experience-based research into Desano by living with the people in Colombia. Her publication focuses mainly on syntactic features of Desano, including but not limited to the issue of verb-compounding, as well as various phonological observations. Miller has also included in her publication examples from the boreka pora dialect of the twenty-two dialects documented in Desano, in order to support the syntactic arguments suggested.

== Phonology ==
=== Vowels ===
Vowel inventory
	Front	Central	Back
High	i	ʉ	u
Mid	e		o
Low		a	

=== Consonants ===
Consonant inventory
		Labial	Dental	Velar	Glottal
Plosive	voiceless	p	t	k	(ʔ)
Plosive	voiced	b	d	g	(ʔ)
Fricative			s		(h)
Approximant		w	j		

== Morphology ==
Thorough documentation of Desano morphology is available from various scholars, mainly contributed by Reichel-Dolmatoff (in Portuguese), and Silva (in English). In which, Silva (2012) has offered a detailed account that covers the nominal and the verbal aspects of Desano morphology. Nominal morphology covers noun roots, pronouns, noun phrase (NP) structures, while verbal morphology covers verb roots, verb classes, and verb constructions. In terms of noun roots, Desano has bimoraic nouns that follow certain tonal requirements, such that each word contains at least one high tone. In general, Desano words follow a CVCV structure in terms of consonants and vowels, which is similar to that of Japanese. Desano nouns generally have a masculine-feminine distinction, as demonstrated in its pronoun inventory. Furthermore, its verbs distinguish between ‘animate’ and ‘inanimate’ entities, which is of close relation to the nature. On top of that, it is evident that Desano presents a clear cut between human beings and non human beings in regards to its lexicon, as illustrated by its strict structure of verb class. Desano’s verb class also details in singular or plural, high class or low class animates, and countable and uncountables. Overall, it is clear that Desano follows a clear and strict morphological order, which details from pronunciation to word choice, and from physical to supernatural state.

=== Pronouns ===
There are two kinds of pronouns in Desano, namely personal pronouns and demonstrative pronouns. Some come with a masculine and feminine distinction in certain classes, similar to that of French or Portuguese.

==== Personal pronouns ====
Personal pronouns in Desano are somewhat comparable to that of “I, we, you, they, he, she, it” in English, in a sense that there is a distinction between first, second, third person, and also singular or plural subjects.

Personal pronouns
		singular	plural
1st person	exclusive	yʉʉ	gʉa
1st person	inclusive	yʉʉ	~bari
2nd person		~bʉʉ	~bʉa
3rd person	masc	~igʉ	ida
3rd person	fem	igo	ida

==== Demonstrative pronouns ====
Demonstrative pronouns are used to “make a distinction between ‘proximal’ and ‘distal’, such distinction of proximity could be understood as using ‘this’ or ‘that’ in English, in relation to the distance between the speaker and the object.

idi~ye
DEM:PROX-topic
'this topic'

i-bu
DEM:PROX-CL:basket
'this basket'

idi-gu
DEM:PROX-CL:trunk
'this tree'

i-do
DEM:PROX-INAN
'this thing (inanimate)'

i-ɾi
DEM:PROX-PL:INAN
'these ones (inanimate)'

idi-sibu
DEM:PROX-time
'this time'

idi-pu
DEM:PROX-CONTR
'this other'

idi-ta
DEM:PROX-EMPH
'this (emphatic)'

si-pu
DEM:DIST-CONTR
'that other'

si-go
DEM:DIST-3SG:F
'that woman'

si-bu
DEM:DIST-CL:basket
'that basket'

=== Verb classes ===
The two main verb classes of Desano are stative and non-stative. There are five subcategories of stative verbs, and four prominent subcategories of non-stative verbs.

1. Stative verbs
  1. Copula verb /adi/, which is used to describe either temporary or permanent states.
  2. Non-existential verb /badi/, which is used for negation, stating that something does not exist. This can be used in combination with nouns to state the nonexistence of a noun.
  3. Stative possessive, /ohpa/. This verb can be used to express “to have” or “to hold”, and can describe both temporary and permanent states.
  4. Locative and position verbs, including the verb /digi/ ‘be standing’, /bede/ or /duo/ ‘to stay’, and /peya/ ‘to be on top of’. The verb /peya/ appears dependently.
  5. Descriptive stative verbs, which have the same function of adjectives. In general, Desano uses descriptive stative verbs rather than a separate class of adjectives.
2. Non-stative verbs
  1. Active verbs that act as the subject of a clause, started by an active agent. There are transitive, intransitive, and ditransitive variations.
  2. Motion verbs, which includes basic motion, directional, and relational.
  3. Placement verbs, which occur independently.
  4. Verbs of perception and mental processes. Verbs of perception can be transitive or intransitive. Some examples are /yɑ̃/ ‘to see’ and /pe/ ‘to hear’. Mental process verbs include beye ‘to explain’ and kẽ ‘to dream’.

=== Nouns ===
Nouns in Desano are subdivided in the following categories, which are marked:

- nouns
  - animate
    - human
      - singular
        - feminine -o/-go
        - masculine -ʉ/-gʉ
      - plural -a/-~da
    - non-human
      - individual -~bʉ
      - collective ∅
  - inanimate
    - countable
      - singular CLS
      - plural -di
    - uncountable ∅

Some nouns naturally have the gender marking suffix in them, due to an amalgamation of the root of the noun and the gender marking suffix, therefore they are considered to be inherently feminine or masculine.

Inherently Feminine Nouns	Inherently Masculine Nouns
yẽhkõ ‘grandmother’	yẽhkʉ ‘grandfather’
buɾo ‘old woman’	buɾʉ ‘old man’
mẽõ ‘mom’	ʉ̃mʉ̃ ‘man’

== Syntax ==
=== Case and agreement ===
Desano is hierarchical. Third-person is at the top of the hierarchy, followed by animate, then singular, and lastly, masculine. At the end of declarative sentences in Desano, there are personal endings that are in agreement with the verb’s subject.

Personal endings
3rd person	singular	masculine	biN
3rd person	singular	feminine	boN
3rd person	plural		baN
non-3rd person/inanimate			byy

Personal endings in use

jyy waa+by	‘I go’
byyN waa+by	‘you go’
igyn waa+biN	‘he goes’
igo waa+boN	‘she goes’
gya waa+by	‘we (excl.) go’
badiN waa+by	‘we (incl.) go’
byaN waa+by	‘you-all go”
idaN waa+baN	‘they go’
wydidu waa+by	‘the airplane goes’

Singular is a feature often given by a base rule. Third-person, animate, and masculine are often thought of as being inherent features of nouns; however, there is some evidence that shows masculine behaves differently than third-person and animate. The evidence supports the claim that it is a feature that is provided grammatically, not inherently a noun feature. The masculine feature in Desano is unmarked, and only given to nouns that are animate-singular.

/abe/ ‘sun, moon’ Desano people would not consider this object to be feminine or masculine, therefore it is unmarked for gender. This means that in cases of agreement, /abe/ will act as a masculine noun. Many nouns which are presented as unmarked for gender will behave as a masculine or feminine noun, with the only indication of gender being the personal verb ending.

== Semantics ==
=== Tense ===
Desano has three tenses:

1. General tense: Does not have an embedded timeframe, the time aspect is assumed to be at the time of speech, which is comparable to present and present progressive tense in English.
2. Non-present tense: Does not specify a particular time or space, except for the differentiation from the present time and present space where the conversation takes place. In which, the non-present tense could be used to demonstrate various distinct aspects of English at once, meaning it could be used for observed, non-visible, reported, and inferred situations.
3. Remote tense: Refers to events that took place or will take place at a relative distance before or from the present time and/or space.

Three tenses of Desano uses relative measurement of time and space, which relies heavier on the speaker’s judgement at the time of the conversation.

Examples of general tense:

igo soda T E boN
she cook GEN EV p.e.
“She cooks”

jyy baa GY-i T E by
I eat partic-do GEN EV p.e.
“I am eating”

IgyN kadiN GY-i T E biN
He sleep partic-do GEN EV p.e.
“He is sleeping”

Examples of non-present tense:

Jyy kadiN a E by
I sleep -NPRES EV p.e.
“I slept”

Juu dodeky a ko by
Ibe sick -NPRES EV p.e.
“I was sick”

IgyN aadi a jo py
He come -NPRES EV p.e.
“He came”

IdaN wai weheN daN ehea a jo baN
They fish kill partic went -NPRES EV p.e.
“They went fishing”

Examples of remote tense:

Dia aadiN R E by
River be REM EV p.e.
“There is a river (far away)”

IgyN aadiN R E biN
He be REM EV p.e.
“He was there (a long time ago), he is there (far away)”

Jyy baa R E by
I eat REM EV p.e.
“I ate (long ago)”

Jyy kabisaN de asuN R E by
I shirt OBL buy REM EV p.e.
“I bought a shirt (long ago)”

From the examples above, it is evident that the tense marker is clearly visible in the written script. Instead of modifying the target verb like many languages (such as transforming eat to ate for the past tense in English), Desano tense markers come in the form of an additional block after the target verb (illustrated by T, e, and R). Overall, Desano tense works closely with its unique mood system, which also embeds emotion into the written form of the grammar itself.

=== Modality ===
==== Evidentiality ====
- Direct
  - Visual evidence: The speaker witnessed the event.
  - Nonvisual evidential: Information acquired by direct evidence other than sight (auditory and other senses, ie. taste, smell, touch).
- Reported
  - Hearsay evidential: Information acquired from some other person who might have (directly) witnessed the event described.
  - Quotative/folklore evidential: Generally appearing in traditional narratives (folklore). It has a ‘near-quotation’ function when no particular referent can be identified as the source of information, or in situations where the speaker has heard about the event from someone who has not directly witnessed the event.
- Inferred
  - Result evidential: Used in utterances that express the speaker’s conclusion based on some type of (indirect) observed results (i.e., the speaker observes results, rather than the actual event causing the result).
  - Inferred: Reason evidential: Based on the speaker’s own previous experience, resulting in reasoning suppositions or on one's cultural/historical/physical knowledge, resulting in assertions of facts.

Types of evidence
direct			indirect				
attested			reported			inferring	
visual	auditory	other sensory	second-hand	third-hand	folklore	results	reasoning
∅	-ku		-~yo	-~yu		-ya	-ka
∅	EVID:NVIS		EVID:HSAY	EVID:QUOT/FOLK		EVID:RES	EVID:REAS

==== Irrealis ====
There are 2 types of irrealis statements:

1. -ka, predictive
2. -bo, speculative

==== ‘Oriented’ ====
Markers of oriented modality:

1. -ke, imperative, demands or requests
2. -ta, admonitive, warning
3. -da, exhortative, encouraging
4. -ku, adversative
