= Koreguaje language =

Tucanoan language spoken in Colombia

Koreguaje
- Korebaju
- Ko'reuaju
- Native to: Colombia
- Region: Caquetá Department
- Ethnicity: Koreguaje
- Native speakers: 2,100 (2008)
- Language family: Tucanoan: Western; Koreguaje–Tama; Koreguaje

Language codes
- ISO 639-3: coe
- Glottolog: kore1283
- ELP: Coreguaje
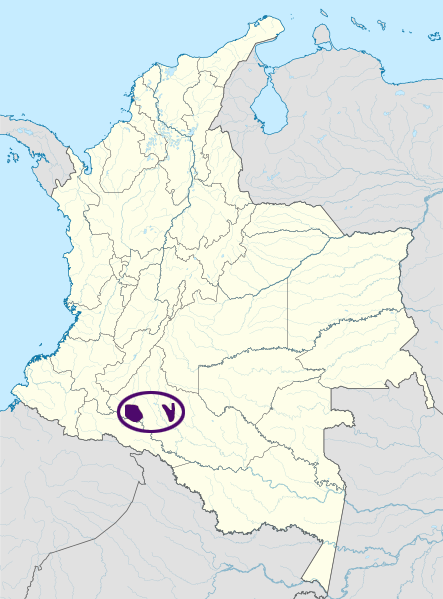

- Koreguaje is classified as Definitely Endangered by the UNESCO Atlas of the World's Languages in Danger (2010).

Koreguaje, Korebaju, or Korebajʉ (Korewaje, Ko'reuaju) is a Tucanoan language of Colombia.

== Phonology ==
=== Vowels ===
Koreguaje has 6 vowels. All vowels have nasalized forms:

	Front		Central		Back	
	oral	nasal	oral	nasal	oral	nasal
Close	i	ĩ	ɨ	ɨ̃	u	ũ
Mid	e	ẽ			o	õ
Open			a	ã		

=== Consonants ===
		Labial	Coronal		Palatal	Velar		Glottal
		Labial	plain	labial	Palatal	plain	labial	Glottal
Nasal	voiceless	m̥			ɲ̥			
Nasal	voiced	m	n		ɲ			
Plosive	tenuis	p	t			k	kʷ	ʔ
Plosive	aspirated	pʰ	tʰ	tʷʰ		kʰ	kʷʰ	
Affricate	voiced		dʒ	dʒʷ				
Continuant	voiceless	w̥	s	sʷ				h
Continuant	voiced	w	ɾ	ɾʷ				

- /dʒ dʒʷ/ are postalveolar; other coronals are alveolar.
- /ɾ/ may be retroflex [ɽ] in initial position.
- /w̥/ is realized as a bilabial [ɸ] or labiodental [f] fricative in free variation before /i/.
- /w/ is realized as a labiovelar approximant [w] or bilabial fricative [β] in free variation in all positions.

== In popular culture ==
The language was spoken in the film Out of the Dark.
