= Tatuyo language =

Tucanoan language of Colombia

Tatuyo
- Wa’ikhana
- Native to: Colombia
- Native speakers: 1,091 (2018)
- Language family: Tucanoan: Eastern; Central; Tatuyo–Carapano; Tatuyo

Language codes
- ISO 639-3: tav
- Glottolog: tatu1247
- ELP: Tatuyo
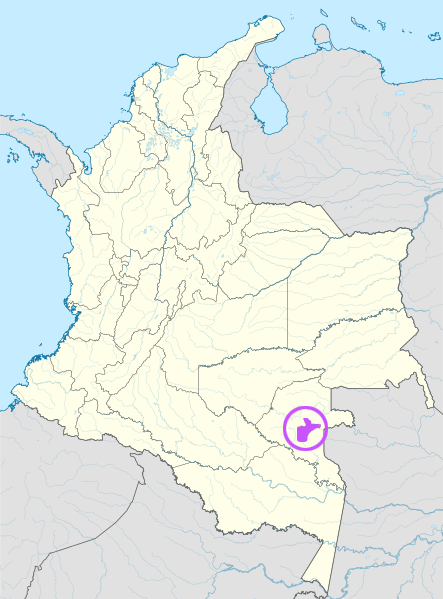

Tatuyo is a Tucanoan language of Colombia. Lexically, its closest relative is Carapano: the two languages' lexicons are 96.3% cognate.

== Phonology ==
Tatuyo has 6 vowels: /a, e, i, ɨ, o, u/. The language is also tonal.

Consonants
		Bilabial	Alveolar	Palatal	Velar	Glottal
Plosive	voiceless	p	t	c	k	
Plosive	voiced	b	d		g	
Approximant				j	w	h
Flap			ɾ			
