= Siriano language =

Tucanoan language of Colombia

Siriano
- Sʉraja
- Native to: Colombia
- Ethnicity: 1,712 Siriano people (2009–2018)
- Native speakers: 217 (2006–2008)
- Language family: Tucanoan: Eastern; Central; Desano–Siriano; Siriano

Language codes
- ISO 639-3: sri
- Glottolog: siri1274
- ELP: Siriano
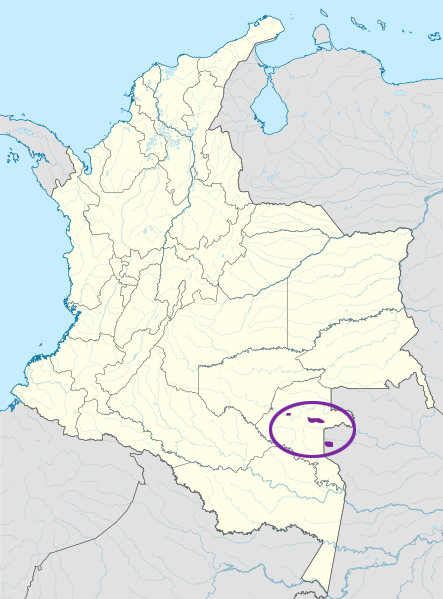

Siriano is a Tucanoan language of Colombia, with a few speakers in Brazil.
