= Waimajã language =

Tucanoan language spoken in South America

Waimajã
- Bará
- Native to: Colombia, Brazil
- Native speakers: 500 (2004–2006) some monolinguals over age 40 (2004?)
- Language family: Tucanoan: Eastern; Central; Bara; Waimajã

Language codes
- ISO 639-3: bao – inclusive code Individual code: pok – Pokangá (Bará)
- Glottolog: waim1255
- ELP: Bará
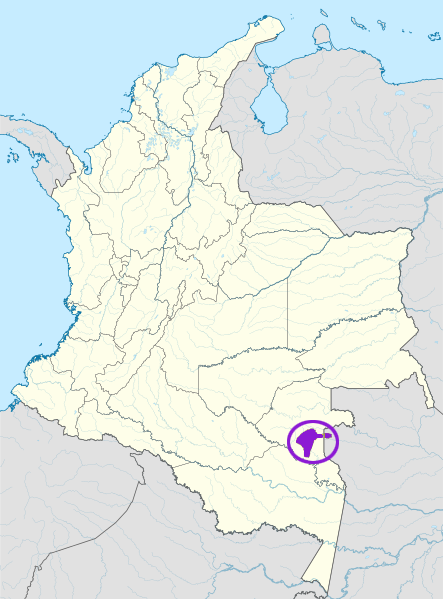

- Bara is classified as Critically Endangered in Colombia by the UNESCO Atlas of the World's Languages in Danger. Bara is classified as Vulnerable in Brazil by the UNESCO Atlas of the World's Languages in Danger.

Waimajã (Waimaha), generically known as Bará or (Northern) Barasano, is a Tucanoan language of Colombia and Brazil. As of 1971, the population of speakers generally lived along the rivers of Colombia, namely, Colorado, Yapu, Inambu, Macucu, and Tiquie.
