= Orteguaza River =

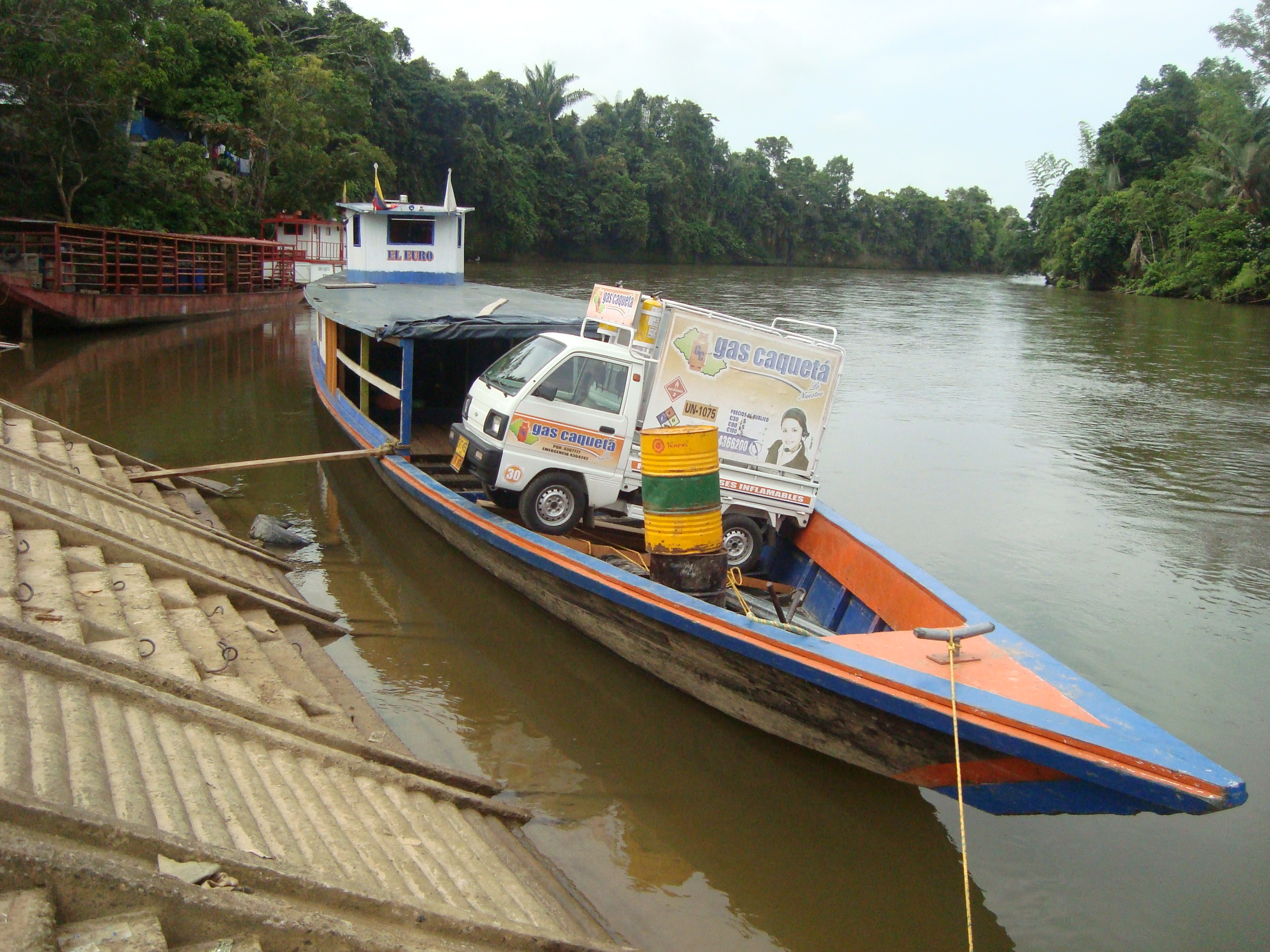

Location
- Country: Colombia

Physical characteristics
- Mouth: Caquetá River
  - location: Near Solano, Caquetá, Colombia
  - coordinates: 0°43′37″N 75°15′54″W

Orteguaza River (Spanish pronunciation: [oɾteˈɣwasa]) is a river of Colombia, located in the Department of Caqueta. It is part of the Amazon River basin.

== See also ==
- List of rivers of Colombia
