= Tucano language =

Tucanoan language spoken in Brazil and Colombia

Tucano
- yeʼpâ-masa yee uúku͂sehé
- Native to: Brazil, Colombia
- Ethnicity: Tucano people
- Native speakers: 4,600 in Brazil (2006); 7,020 in Colombia (2012), including Pisamira
- Language family: Tucanoan: Eastern; North; Tucano

Official status
- Official language in: Brazil (Amazonas, São Gabriel da Cachoeira)

Language codes
- ISO 639-3: tuo
- Glottolog: tuca1252
- ELP: Tukano
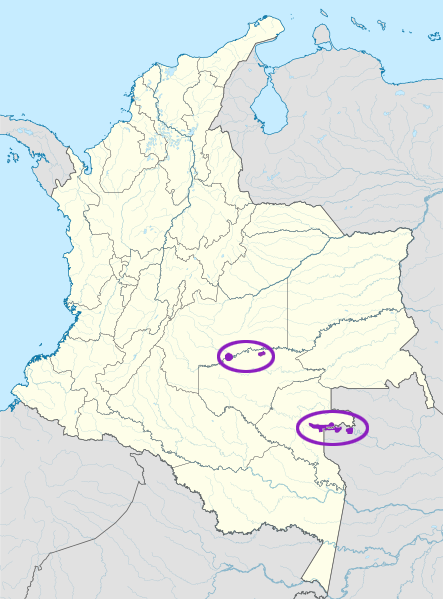

Tucano, also Tukano or Tucana, endonym yeʼpâ-masa yee uúku͂sehé, is a Tucanoan language spoken in Amazonas, Brazil and Colombia.

Many Tariana people, speakers of the endangered Tariana language are switching to Tucano.

== Phonology ==
=== Consonants ===
		Bilabial	Alveolar	Palatal	Velar	Glottal
Plosive	voiceless	p	t		k	ʔ
Plosive	voiced	b	d		ɡ	
Nasal		(m)	(n)		(ŋ)	
Fricative			s			h
Approx./Tap		w	ɾ	j		

- /b d ɡ/ have nasal allophones [m n ŋ] between nasal vowels.
- Plosives may be prenasalized [ᵐb ⁿd ᵑɡ] after nasal vowels.
- /w/ may be realized [β̞̃] in the environment of nasal vowels.
- Allophones of /ɾ/ can be heard as [ɾ̃], [ɺ].

=== Vowels ===
Vowels
	Front		Central		Back	
	oral	nasal	oral	nasal	oral	nasal
Close	i	ĩ	ɨ	ɨ̃	u	ũ
Mid	e	ẽ			o	õ
Open			a	ã		

== See also ==
- Tucano people

== Bibliography ==
- Ramirez, Henri (2019). "uúku͂sehe (ye'pâ-masa yee uúku͂sehé)" (PDF). A Fala Tukano dos Ye’pâ-Masa, Tomo II: Dicionário (in Portuguese) (versão atualizada ed.). Manaus: Inspetoria Salesiana Missionária da Amazônia.
- West, Birdie; Welch, Betty (1967). "Phonemic system of Tucano". In Waterhouse, Viola G. (ed.). Phonemic systems of Colombian languages. Norman: Summer Institute of Linguistics of the University of Oklahoma. pp. 11–24.
- Aikhenvald, Alexandra Y. (1996). "Areal diffusion in northwest Amazonia: The case of Tariana". Anthropological Linguistics. 38 (1): 73–116.
