= Carapana language =

Tucanoan language

Carapana
- Karapanã
- Mõxtã
- Native to: Colombia, Brazil
- Ethnicity: Karapanã
- Native speakers: 500 (2012)
- Language family: Tucanoan: Eastern; Central; Tatuyo–Carapana; Carapana

Language codes
- ISO 639-3: cbc
- Glottolog: cara1272
- ELP: Carapana
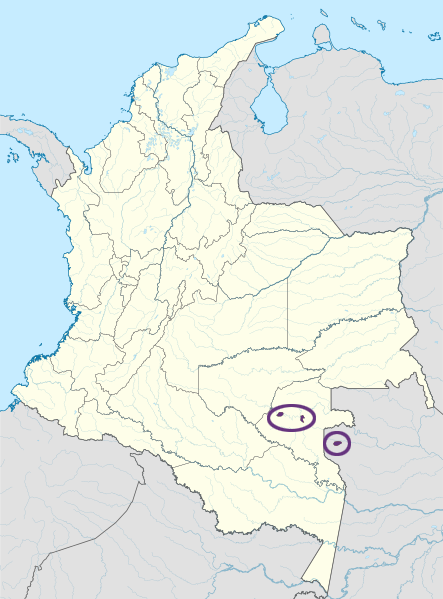

Carapana (Karapanã, Carapana-tapuya, Möxdöá) is a Tucanoan language of Colombia and Brazil.

== Phonology ==
Carapana has 11 consonants.

Consonants of Carapana
		Bilabial	Alveolar	Palatal	Velar	Glottal
Plosive	voiceless	p	t		k	
Plosive	voiced	b	d		g	
Fricative			s			
Tap			ɾ			
Approximant		w		j		h

- /p, t, k/ alternate with /pʰ, tʰ, kʰ/.
- /b, d, g/ become [m, n, ŋ] before nasal vowels. They become [ᵐb, ⁿd, ᵑg] after nasal vowels.
- /b, d/ alternate with [ᵐb, ⁿd] at the beginning of a word, e.g., báì /báì/ [báì]~[ᵐbáì] 'younger brother'.
- /s/ alternates with /t͡s/.
- /ɾ/ has three variants
  - /n̆/ next to nasal vowels
  - /ɺ/ before oral vowels, at the beginning of a word, and
  - /ɾ/ elsewhere.
- /w, h/ are often [β, x] before front vowels.
- /j/ alternates with pre-stopped [ᵈj].
- /w, j, h/ become [w̃, j̃, h̃] before nasal vowels.

It also has 6 vowels and their nasalized forms, plus high and low tones.

	Front	Central	Back
Close	i ĩ	ɨ ɨ̃	u ũ
Mid	e ẽ		o õ
Open		a ã	

- The mid vowels /e, ẽ, o, õ/ are phonetically [ɛ, ɛ̃, ɔ, ɔ̃].
- Mid tone is an allotone of the low tone.

== Orthography ==
Metzger and Metzger use the following orthography.

IPA	Orthography
a	a
e	e
i	i
o	o
u	u
ɨ	ʉ
ã	ã
ẽ	ẽ
ĩ	ĩ
õ	õ
ũ	ũ
ɨ̃	ʉ̃
b	b, m
d	d, n
j	y, ñ
g	g, gu
h	j
k	c, qu
p	p
r	r
s	s
t	t
w	w
◌́	◌́
◌̀	not marked

== Works cited ==
- Metzger, Ronald; Metzger, Lois (1973). "Fonología del carapana". Sistemas fonológicos de idiomas columbianos (in Spanish). Vol. 2. Instituto Lingüístico de Verano. pp. 121–132.
