= Macuna language =

Tucanoan language of Colombia and Brazil

Macuna
- Macuna-Erulia
- Masa ye
- Native to: Colombia
- Ethnicity: Macuna people
- Native speakers: 1,032 (2008–2011)
- Language family: Tucanoan: Eastern Tucanoan; South; Barasana–Macuna; Macuna

Language codes
- ISO 639-3: myy
- Glottolog: macu1260
- ELP: Macuna
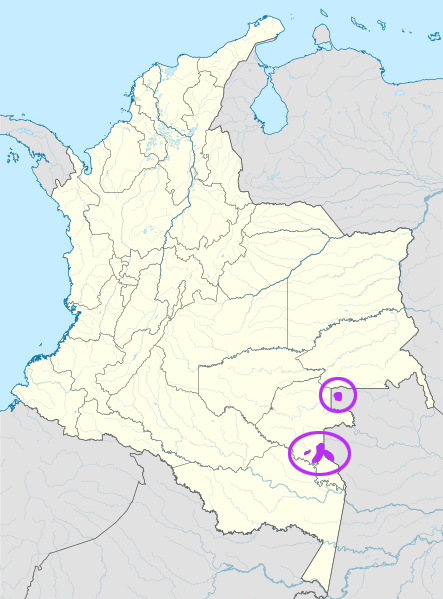

Macuna, also known as Buhagana, Wahana, is a Tucanoan language of Colombia and Brazil.
