= Tucanoan languages =

Language family of South America

Tucanoan
- Tukánoan
- Geographic distribution: Amazon
- Linguistic classification: One of the world's primary language families
- Subdivisions: Eastern; Western

Language codes
- Glottolog: tuca1253
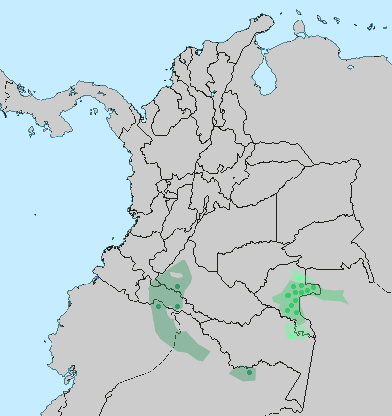
- East Tukano (nuclear green), Central Tukano (turquoise green) and West Tukano (dark green). Dots indicate current locations of the various languages. Shaded areas indicate their extents before the 20th century.

Tucanoan (also Tukanoan, Tukánoan) is a language family of Colombia, Brazil, Ecuador, and Peru.

== Language contact ==
Jolkesky (2016) notes that there are lexical similarities with the Arutani, Paez, Sape, Taruma, Witoto-Okaina, Saliba-Hodi, Tikuna-Yuri, Pano, Barbakoa, Bora-Muinane, and Choko language families due to contact.

== Classification ==
=== Chacon (2014) ===
There are two dozen Tucanoan languages. There is a clear binary split between Eastern Tucanoan and Western Tucanoan.

- Tucanoan
  - Western Tucanoan
    - ?Cueretú (Kueretú) †
    - Napo
      - Orejón (a.k.a. M'áíhɨ̃ki, Maijiki, Coto, Koto, Payoguaje, Payaguá, Payowahe, Payawá)
      - Correguaje–Secoya
        - Correguaje (Koreguaje, Korewahe, a.k.a. Caquetá)
        - Siona–Secoya (Upper Napo, Baicoca–Siecoca)
          - ?Macaguaje (a.k.a. Kakawahe, Piohé)
          - Siona (Bai Coca, Sioni, Pioje, Pioche-Sioni, Tetete)
          - Secoya (Sieko Coca, Airo Pai, Piohé)
          - ?Tama †
  - Eastern Tucanoan
    - South
      - Tanimuca (a.k.a. Retuarã)
      - ?Yauna (Jaúna, Yahuna, Yaúna) †
    - West
      - Barasana–Macuna
        - Macuna (a.k.a. Buhagana, Wahana, Makuna-Erulia, Makuna)
        - Barasana (Southern Barasano, a.k.a. Paneroa, Eduria, Edulia, Comematsa, Janera, Taibano, Taiwaeno, Taiwano)
      - Cubeo–Desano
        - Cubeo (Cuveo, Kobeua, Kubewa)
        - Yupua–Desano
          - ?Yupuá †
          - Desano–Siriano (a.k.a. Desano)
    - East
      - Central
        - Tucano (Tukana, a.k.a. Dasea)
        - Waimaha–Tatuyo
          - Waimajã (a.k.a. Bara, Northern Barasano)
          - Tatuyo
      - North
        - Kotiria–Piratapuyo
          - Guanano (Wanana, Wanano, a.k.a. Kotedia, Kotiria, Wanana-Pirá)
          - Piratapuyo (a.k.a. Waikina, Uiquina)
        - Pisamira–Yuruti
          - Pisamira–Carapano (Carapana, Karapana)
          - Tuyuca–Yuruti
            - Tuyuka (Tejuca, Teyuka, Tuyuca, a.k.a. Bara, Barasana)
            - Yurutí

Plus unclassified Miriti.†

Most languages are, or were, spoken in Colombia.

=== Jolkesky (2016) ===
Internal classification by Jolkesky (2016):

(† = extinct)

- Tukano
  - Tukano, Western
    - Kueretu †
    - Tukano, Western, Nuclear
      - Mai Huna
      - Koreguaje-Pioje
        - Koreguaje-Tama
          - Koreguaje
          - Tama †
        - Pioje (Baicoca–Siecoca)
          - Makaguaje
          - Sekoya
          - Siona
          - Tetete †
  - Tukano, Eastern
    - Tanimuka; Retuarã; Yahuna
    - Tukano, Eastern, West
      - Kubeo-Desano
        - Kubeo
        - Desano-Yupua
          - Desano; Siriano
          - Yupua †
      - Makuna; Barasano; Eduria
    - Tukano, Eastern, East
      - Tukano-Tatuyo
        - Tukano
        - Tatuyo-Bara-Waimaha
          - Tatuyo
          - Bara; Waimaha
      - Tuyuka-Wanano
        - Wanano-Piratapuyu
          - Wanano
          - Piratapuyo
        - Tuyuka-Karapanã
          - Karapanã; Pisamira
          - Tuyuka; Yuruti

=== Loukotka (1968) ===
Below is a full list of Tucanoan language varieties listed by Loukotka (1968), including names of unattested varieties.

Tucanoan language varieties listed by Loukotka (1968)

Western group

- Tama - spoken on the Yarú River and Caguán River, Caquetá territory, Colombia, but now perhaps extinct.
- Coreguaje - spoken at the sources of the Caquetá River, department of Cauca, Colombia.
- Amaguaje / Encabellado / Rumo - extinct language once spoken on the Aguarico River, department of Loreto, Peru.
- Siona / Zeona / Ceño / Kokakañú - language spoken at the sources of the Putumayo River and Caquetá River, Putumayo territory, Colombia.
- Ificuene - spoken between the Güepi River and Aguarico River, Loreto. (Unattested.)
- Eno - language spoken by a few individuals at the mouth of the San Miguel River, Caquetá territory, Colombia. (Unattested.)
- Secoya - language spoken on the Putumayo River, Oriente province, Ecuador. (Johnson and Peeke 1962.)
- Icaguate - extinct language once spoken on the Caucaya River and Putumayo River, Putumayo territory, Colombia.
- Macaguaje - spoken in the same territory on the Mecaya River and Caucaya River and around Puerto Restrepo, by a few families.
- Tetete / Eteteguaje - extinct language once spoken at the sources of the Güepi River, Loreto. (Unattested.)
- Pioje / Angotero / Ancutere - spoken on the Napo River, Tarapoto River, and Aguarico River, Loreto.
- Cóto / Payoguaje - spoken at the mouth of the Napo River, Loreto, Peru.

Yahuna group

- Yahuna / Jaúna - spoken on the Apoporis River, territory of Amazonas, Colombia.
- Tanimuca / Opaina - spoken by a small tribe on the Popeyaca River and Guacayá River, Amazonas, Colombia.
- Dätuana - spoken north of the preceding tribe on the Apoporis River.
- Menimehe [Jeruriwa] - spoken by a very little known tribe at the mouth of the Mirití-paraná River and Caquetá River. (Unattested.)

Yupua group

- Yupua / Hiupiá - spoken on the Coca River, a tributary of the Apoporis River, Colombia.
- Kushiita - once spoken at the mouth of the Apoporis River, state of Amazonas, Brazil. Now perhaps extinct. (Unattested.)
- Durina / Sokó - spoken on the Carapato River, Amazonas territory, Colombia.

Coretu group

- Coretu / Kueretú - spoken on the Mirití-paraná River, state of Amazonas, Brazil.

Cubeo group

- Cubeo / Kobéua / Kaniwa / Hahanana - spoken on the Caiarí River and Cuduiarí River, state of Amazonas, Brazil. Dialects are:
  - Dyuremáwa / Yiboia-tapuya - spoken on the Querarí River, Amazonas.
  - Bahukíwa / Bahuna - spoken by a tribe that originally spoke a language of the Arawak stock, on the Cuduiarí River.
  - Hehénawa - spoken on the Cuduiarí River.
  - Hölöua - spoken on the Cuduiarí River, now perhaps extinct. (Unattested.)

Särä group

- Särä - spoken between the Tiquié River and Piraparaná River, Vaupés territory, Colombia.
- Ömöa - spoken at the sources of the Tiquié River, Colombia.
- Buhágana / Karawatana - spoken on the Piraparaná River, Colombia.
- Macuna - spoken at the mouth of the Apoporis River, Colombia.

Erulia group

- Erulia / Paboa / Eduria - spoken on the Piraparaná River, Colombia.
- Tsaloa - spoken on the Piraparaná River.
- Palänoa - spoken on the middle course of the Piraparaná River.

Desána group

- Desána / Wína / Vina - spoken between the Tiquié River and Caiarí River, partly in Colombia and partly in Brazil.
- Chiránga / Siriána - spoken on the Paca-igarapé River, Colombia.

Tucano group

- Tucano / Tocano / Dace / Dagseje / Dajseá / Tocana - language of a large tribe that lived on the Vaupés and Tiquié River; state of Amazonas, Brazil.
- Uaíana - on the Caiary River, Colombia.
- Tuyuca / Doxcapura - spoken on the Tiquié River and Papury River, partly in Brazil, partly in Colombia.
- Arapaso / Koréa - extinct language once spoken on the Yapú River, Amazonas, Brazil. The last survivors now speak only Tucano. (Unattested.)
- Waikína / Uiquina / Uaíkana / Pira-tapuya - spoken on the Papury River, Colombia.
- Uantya / Puçá-tapuya - once spoken on the Macú-igarapé River, Colombia.
- Bará / Pocanga - spoken at the sources of the Tiquié River, Colombia.
- Uasöna / Pisa-tapuya - spoken on the Caiary River, Colombia.
- Tsölá / Teiuana - spoken on the Tiquié River and Piraparaná River, Colombia.
- Urubú-tapuyo - extinct language once spoken at the sources of the Caiary River, Colombia.
- Pamöá / Tatú-tapuyo - spoken at the sources of the Papury River and on the Tuyigarapé, Colombia.
- Patsoca / Iuruty-tapuyo - once spoken on the Abio River and Apoporis River, Colombia.
- Möxdöá / Carapana-tapuya - spoken between the Papury River and Caiary River, Colombia.
- Uanána / Wanána / Kotédia - spoken on the Caiarí River near the Cachoeira dos Araras, Brazil.

== Proto-language ==
Proto-Tukanoan reconstructions by Chacon (2013):

gloss	proto-Tukanoan
3rd.person.masculine	*-pi
agouti	*wuɨ
ant sp.	*meka
aracu fish	*p’ot’ika
armadillo	*pãmu
back	*sõkɨ
bat	*ojo
big	*pahi
(to) bite	*kũ
black	*tj’ĩ
black ink (jenipapo)	*weʔe
blood	*tj’ie
blow	*pu-
bone	*k’oʔa
(to) break	*p’ope (*poa)
breast	*upe
buriti palm	*neʔe
capybara	*kuetju
cara (Dioscorea alata)	*japi
case	*-t’e
centipede; boa	*jãk’i
charcoal (1)	*nitti
charcoal (2); grease	*neo
cheek	*wajo
chew	*tj’ãk’ɨ
chili	*p’ia
cold	*tjɨsi
kapok	*jɨi
(to) cut	*t’ɨtte
dance / ritualized songs	*p’aja
deer	*jama
dove	*ƭʃɨ-
duck	*p’ete
ear	*k’ãp’o
egg	*tj’ia
elder	*p’ɨkɨ
elevated structure (shelves, roof, etc.) (jirau)	*kaja
(to) end	*pet’i
excrement	*k’ɨt’a
face	*tj’ia
father	*pa-kɨ
feminine	*-k’o
fire / firewood	*peka
fish; fish sp. (?)	*waʔi
(to) fish with a net; strain, remove	*wajo
fishing net	*p’api
float	*paʔja
flower	*k’oʔo
foot	*k’ɨp’o
fruit sp.	*toa
Inga (fruit sp.)	*p’ene
garden; outside; village	*wese
gather / collect	*tʃɨ-a
grandfather	*jẽkku-
grape	*ɨʔje
grass	*taja
green / blue / not ripe	*tjɨ̃p’e
hand; palm (of the hand)	*pɨtɨ
head	*tj’ɨpo
heavy	*t’ɨkkɨ
heron	*jahi
hole	*k’ope
hot; heat	*atjɨ
house; anthill	*wɨ’e
hummingbird	*mimi
I	*jɨʔɨ
insect sp.	*tjusi
jaguar	*jai
kingfisher	*tjãsa
know	*masi
lake	*tj’itta
land / territory / region	*jep’a
larva	*p’ekko
leg; hips; knee	*jɨ̃ka
locative / part-of-a-whole	*-t’o
distant	*tj’oa
macaw	*maha
man	*ɨmɨ
manioc	*kɨi
monkey	*takke
monkey sp. / coati	*sisi
mosquito	*mɨte
mouth	*tj’ɨse (*jɨ-ʔo)
name	*wãmi
navel	*tʃõp’ɨ
non-3rd animate person	-p’ɨ
nose	*ɨ̃kʷ’e
paca	*seme
pacu fish	*uhu
palm weevil	*pĩko
parrot	*wekko
path	*maʔa
peccary	*tjẽse
penis	*no-
people; 1.pl.inclusive	*p’ã-tjã
(to) plant	*otte
poison	*tjima
pot / ceramics / clay	*sot-
pupunha palm	*ɨne
red	*sõʔa
river	*tj’ia
root	*t’ɨ̃k ’o
(to) rub	*sĩk’e
(to) sit	
(to) sleep	*kã-
(to) smoke meat	*sɨʔjo
snake	*ãja
spider	*p’ɨpɨ
spirit; ancestral	*wãtti
(to) squeeze	*p’ipo
(to) stop	*nɨk’V
stone	*k’ɨ̃ta
stump; stick, club	*tu-tu
(to) swell	*p’upi
tapir	*wekkɨ
termite	*p’utu
thorn; fishhook	*pota
three	*ɨt’ia
thunder	*wɨ̃po
toad sp.	*p’opa
tobacco	*mɨt’o
tocandira ant	*piata
tongue / liver	*tj’eme
tooth	*k’õpi
tortoise; turtle	*k’oɨ
toucan	*tj’ase (?)
traira fish	*t’oje
tree	*tjũkkɨ
(to) urinate	*k’one
urucum (achiote)	*p’õsa
(to) wait	*kʷɨt’e
wasp	*utti
water	*okko
white; whitewash	*p’o-
wife	*t’ɨ̃po
wind	*wĩno
woman	*t’õmi-
woodpecker	*kone
yam	*jãp’o
you all	*mɨ-tja

== Bibliography ==
- Campbell, Lyle. (1997). American Indian languages: The historical linguistics of Native America. New York: Oxford University Press. ISBN 0-19-509427-1.
- Kaufman, Terrence. (1990). Language history in South America: What we know and how to know more. In D. L. Payne (Ed.), Amazonian linguistics: Studies in lowland South American languages (pp. 13–67). Austin: University of Texas Press. ISBN 0-292-70414-3.
- Kaufman, Terrence. (1994). The native languages of South America. In C. Mosley & R. E. Asher (Eds.), Atlas of the world's languages (pp. 46–76). London: Routledge.
