= Languages of Ecuador =

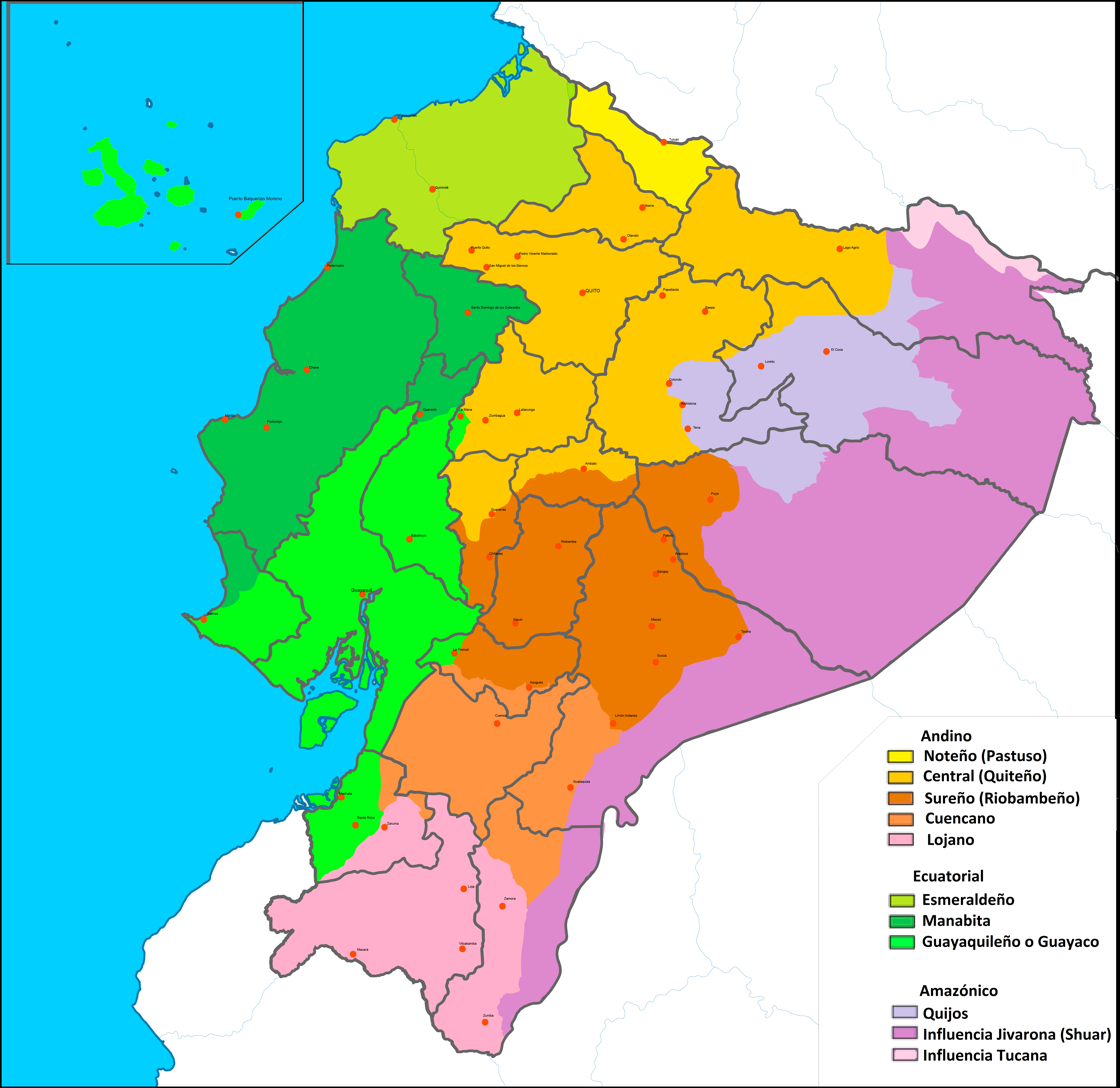
- Map of the main dialects of Spanish in Ecuador
- Official: Spanish; Spanish, Kichwa and Shuar for intercultural relations; Remaining indigenous languages are official where they are spoken
- Main: Spanish
- Indigenous: Achuar–Shiwiar, Awa–Cuaiquer, Cha'palaachi, Cofán, Colorado, Emberá languages, Quechua languages, Secoya, Shuar, Siona, Tetete, Waorani, Záparo
- Vernacular: Ecuadorian Spanish, Media Lengua, Andean Spanish, Equatorial Spanish
- Foreign: English
- Signed: Ecuadorian Sign Language
- Keyboard layout: Spanish Latinamerican QWERTY

There are a total of 14 languages of Ecuador. Spanish in Ecuador is very rich and consists of several dialects that have been creating regional identities within this country. On the other hand, of the original languages, both Kichwa and Shuar are spoken within the corresponding indigenous communities and are legally considered as official languages of intercultural relationship within those communities. The rest of the indigenous languages do not have this recognition. Spanish is the official and most commonly spoken language in Ecuador with (97.0%; 2022 census), of the population speaking Spanish.

In total, according to the most recent census of 2022, up to 3.2% of the population speak an indigenous language. This amounts to 645.821 people that are distributed in the following way:

- Kichwa with 527,333 speakers, making up about 82% of the total indigenous population.
- Shuar with 59,894 speakers, making up a bit more than 9% of the total indigenous population.
- Other languages with 58,594 speakers, making up about 9% of the total indigenous population.

The other languages cited include the following: Achuar–Shiwiar, Awa–Cuaiquer, Cha'palaachi, Cofán, Colorado, Emberá languages, Secoya, Shuar, Siona, Tetete, Waorani, Záparo.

== Languages by Family ==
=== Indigenous languages ===
Many indigenous languages of Ecuador are severely threatened and the number of speakers has decreased a lot throughout the 20th century. The following is a list of all the known languages, the already extinct languages have been marked with the sign (†).

- Barbacoan languages: Awa Pit, Tsafiki, Cha'palaachi, Caranqui (†), Pasto (†)
- Cañari-Puruhá languages: Cañari (†), Puruhá (†)
- Chicham languages: Shuar, Achuar-Shiwiar
- Tucanoan languages: Siona, Secoya, Tetete (†)
- Zaparoan languages: Záparo
- Isolated or unclassified languages: Wao, Cofán, Esmeraldeño (†), Palta (†), Panzaleo (†), Chonos (†), Tabancale-Aconipa (†), Bolona (†), Campaces (†), Colima (†), Manta(Manabi)-Huancavilca (†), Malaba (†), Puná (†), Quijo (†), Quillacinga (†), Rabona (†), Xiroa (†), Yumba (†)

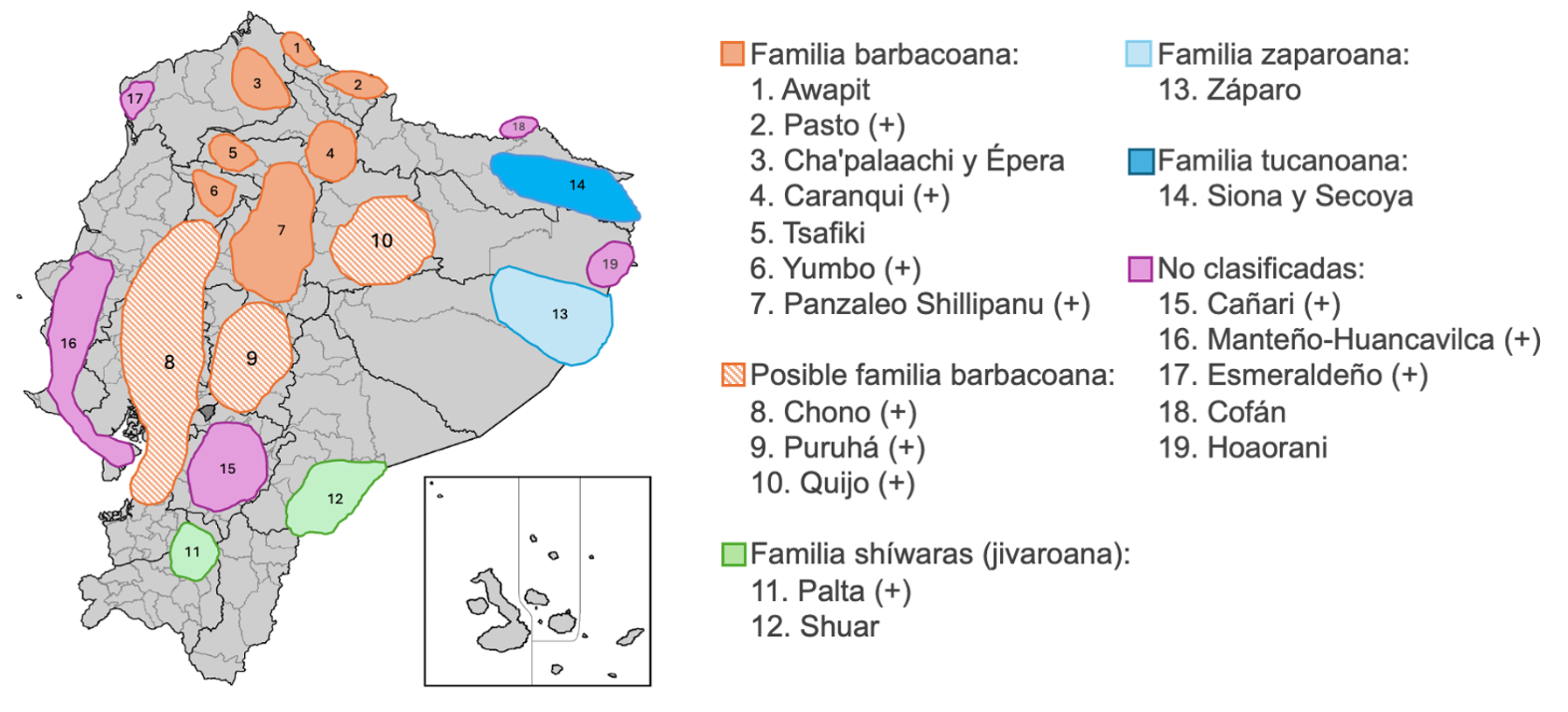
Map of the indigenous languages of Ecuador, including extinct and living languages, classified and unclassified.

Indigenous languages in Ecuador primarily fall into the Zaparoan, Chicham, and Tucanoan families, with Huaorani being an isolated language. The Barbacoan language family is also significant, with five extant languages—Cha'palaachi, Tsáfiqui, Awá. Additionally, several extinct languages like Caranqui, Puruhá, Pasto, Panzaleo, and Chono are believed to have Barbacoan roots, based on their historical locations in inter-Andean valleys and the Guayas River basin. However the precise classification will remain uncertain due to the linguistic components that were lost.

The Chicham languages, including Shuar and Achuar in Ecuador, form a small family, or potentially a single isolated language, spoken in the Amazonian lowlands of northern Peru and eastern Ecuador. These languages exhibit high mutual intelligibility. Tucanoan languages, such as Tukano and Secoya found in Ecuador, are spoken across the northwest Amazon in Brazil, Colombia, Peru, and Ecuador. The Zaparoan languages, concentrated in the Záparo ethnicity in Ecuador's Amazonian regions, are critically endangered due to their small number of speakers.

Beyond these established families, several languages remain unclassified or isolated. The extinct Cañari language, spoken in south-central Ecuador, is often linked to the Puruhá language, leading to the conjectured "Cañar-Puruhá" family, though a lack of grammatical documentation hinders definitive classification. Similarly, the extinct Esmeraldeño and Manteño-Huancavilca languages are unclassified, with their linguistic families unknown. Isolated languages like Wao and Cofán are also spoken by indigenous groups in the Ecuadorian Amazon. The extensive castilianization during the colonial period, especially on the Ecuadorian coast, led to the disappearance of many indigenous languages, often leaving only toponyms as evidence of their past presence.

=== Map of indigenous languages by family ===
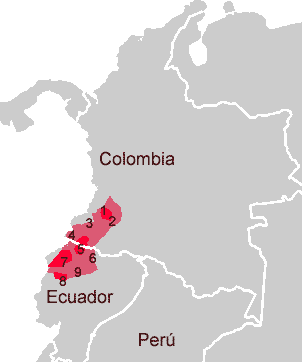
Barbacoan Languages

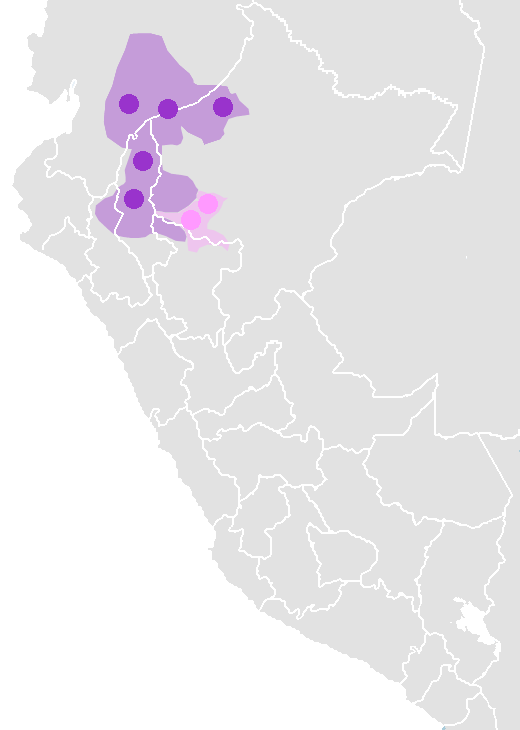
Chicham languages

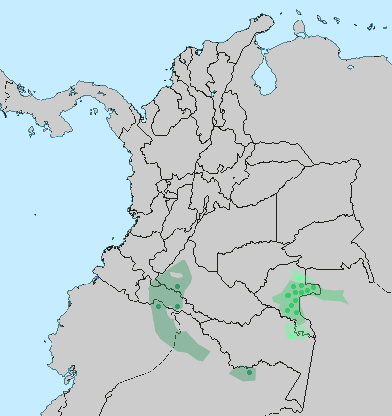
Tucanoan languages

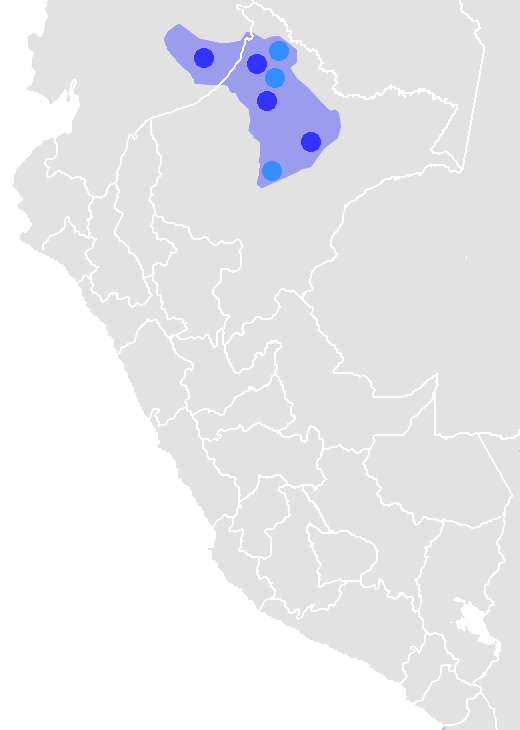
Zaparoan Languages

=== Allochthonous languages ===
Within the category of allochthonous languages, that is, not native, are the languages that were brought to Ecuadorian territory by other human groups through conquests or migration from places that are not within the territory where the linguistic family developed. Of all of them, Spanish is the most spoken, followed by kichwa. It includes the Latin language that has historical relevance for literature, scholastic philosophy and music that was developed during the Real Audiencia of Quito.

- Indo-European languages: Spanish, English, Portuguese, French, Italian, Latin, Greek
- Quechua languages: Kichwa/quichua
- Sino-Tibetan languages: Chinese

=== Sign languages ===
- Isolated language: Ecuadorian sign language

== History of the diffusion of Spanish ==
=== The rapid Castilianization of the coast ===
On the coast of Ecuador, Quichua was not used as a language franca of evangelization, so its diffusion did not continue from the Inca conquest to the colonial era as if it happened in the Andes. This made it rather that the local chiefs of this region, both of the manteña and milagro quevedo cultures, see in Spanish as an opportunity to maintain their power. This power was in turn complemented with the lands of which they maintained ownership after the Spanish conquest. There are many examples of how the local caciques acted as direct translators from the manteño language or chona language to the Castilian language, unlike the caciques of the sierra who maintained power through a quechuization of the original languages such as puruhá, panzaleo, cañari and cara.

It is important to mention the story of Baltazar Zamán, who was the chief and governor of San Esteban de Charapotó in Manabí. Originally this city would be created from a colonial reduction in 1594. Along with other chiefs such as Don Juan, de Tosagua, Sancala and Don Gonzalo who were chiefs of Pasao were important translators. Note that both Pasao and Tosagua became part of Charapotó previously, so collaboration between each leader was important. The possibility of being a descendant of indigenous nobility and being able to administer a territory that in those years (late sixteenth century) was still multilingual, gave them great importance to the eyes of the crown. The Spaniards were concentrated in Puerto Viejo and needed a local leader to manage the other reductions that together formed a true mosaic. It is even known that Baltazar Zamán traveled several times to Spain with the aim of extending the position of governor to ask for another republican position that could mean promotion and honor. When the indigenous communities were led by chiefs who spoke Spanish, they embraced Castilian customs quickly for ambition and social promotion, and without a reference to serve as an alternative such as Quechua, the Castilianization of the Ecuadorian coast (except Esmeraldas), took place in an accelerated way. Currently there are very few studies about the two linguistic families spoken by the Manteños and the Chonos.

=== Literature and history in Spanish ===
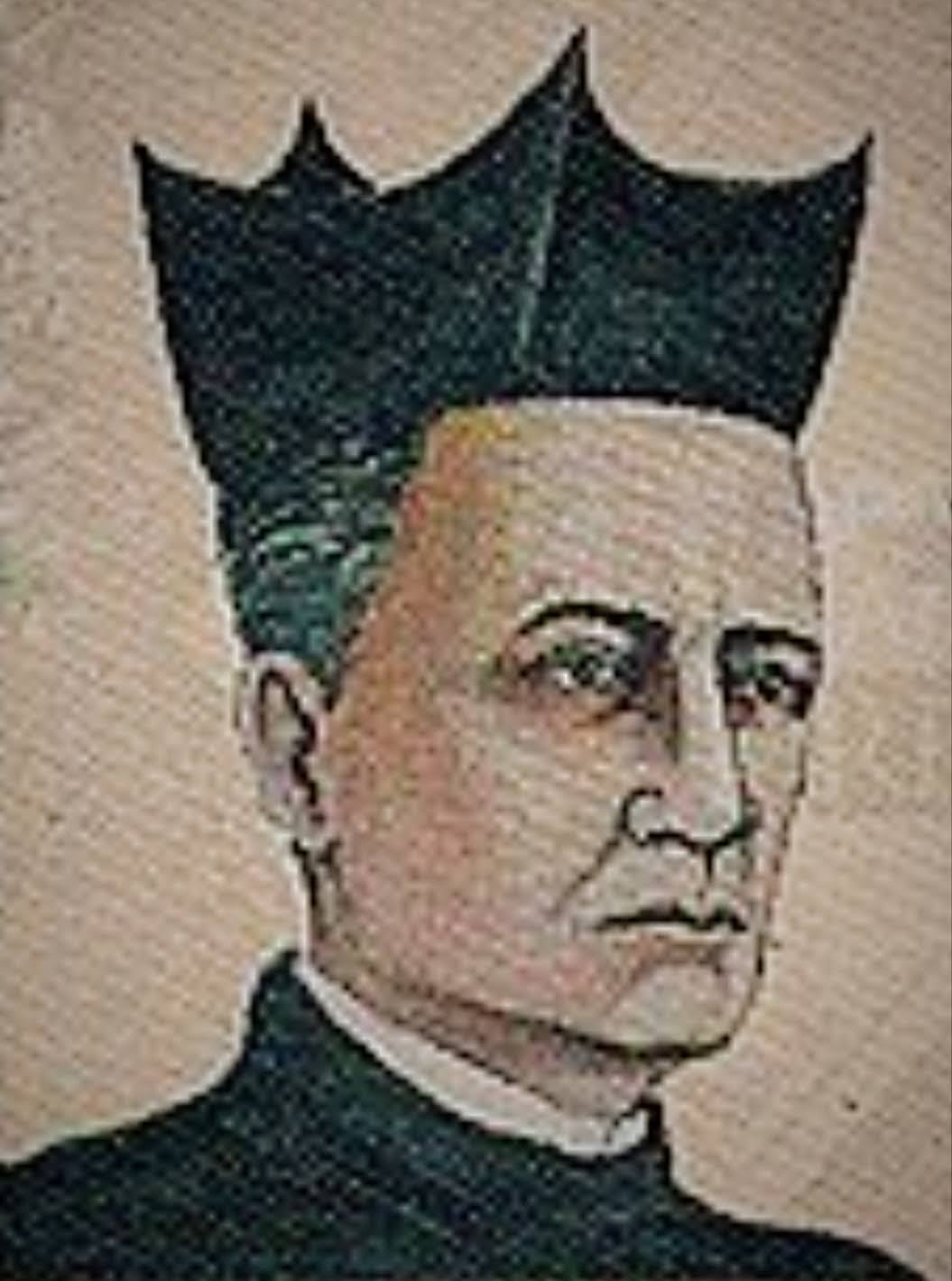
Antonio Bastidas

Added to all this is the publication of the first book of poems in Spanish by Antonio de Bastidas and Jacinto de Evia. While it is true that poetry had previously been made in Spanish in the Royal Audience, this would be the first time that it would be published as a complete collection of poems in a consolidated way. The role of Bastidas is of utmost importance because he not only dedicated himself in the creative part to developing his work but he was rather a pedagogue who founded rhetoric in the Royal Audience and his disciples continued his work, giving great importance to the publication of his poems with European editions for their dissemination. At this time it is important to highlight the essays of Gaspar de Villarroel that were very erudite but were limited to particular efforts since he did not create his own school, and rather did it within his free time after his other responsibilities. A different case was that of Pedro de Mercado, an important historian and writer of ascetic themes and ethics of virtue. He published in Spanish unlike the old custom that rather opted for Latin. He was called the oracle of Santafé, where he developed part of his career.

=== Music and Castilianization ===
It is known that during the evolution of music in the Royal Audience of Quito, the Christmas carol was a musical genre that was quite widespread because unlike the rest of the musical genres that were interpreted in Latin, this was made in Spanish. This helped in the process of evangelization in the Royal Audience of Quito and was often preferred over other musical genres. For this reason he was performed on many occasions and also increased the number of available compositions. The Christmas carol was not only developed under the context of the masses in the churches but was also welcomed outside them especially on the coast for the celebration of the chigualos, which helped in turn to become a musical genre related to Christmas that is shared by Afro-Ecuadorians and Montubios to this day.

The Christmas carols were related to the Pass of the Traveling Child that was so popular, especially in the center and austro of Ecuador, in the cities of Riombamba and Cuenca. This tradition is celebrated to this day and is a fundamental part of the identity of this region of Ecuador. The Child's Pass is also related to the Cuenca chola, which is a leading figure in the parades that are held at the end of the year on the occasion of the celebration of the Child Jesus.

== Spanish grammar in the Royal Audience of Quito ==
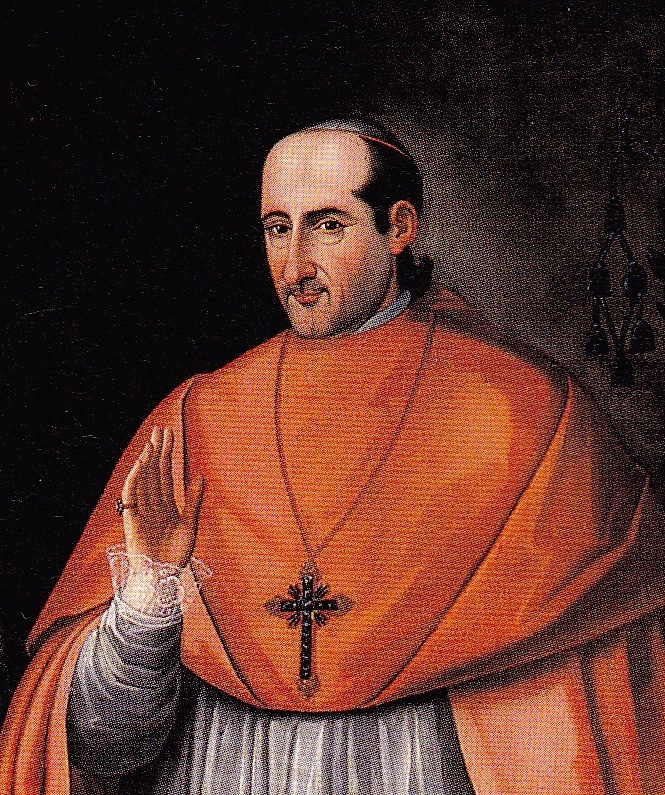
José Pérez Calama, Bishop of Quito

One of the most important grammar publications in the Royal Audience of Quito would be José Pérez Calama. His method of teaching Spanish and Latin grammar would be so productive that it would have a lot of influence and diffusion. This would be, along with the reforms to the scholasticism of the Royal Audience of Quito, one of his greatest contributions within the time he lived in Quito, in the middle of the process of illustration that was lived in the Audiencia.

=== Spanish in the Republic ===
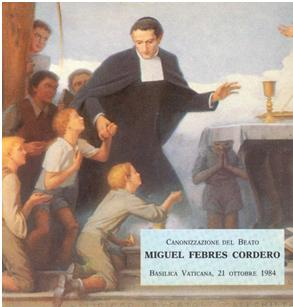
Brother Miguel, linguist and saint of the Catholic Church

The creation of the Academy of Language and the development of literature in the diffusion of Spanish was of the utmost importance. For him, there was still an important fraction, about 30% of the population, who did not speak Spanish. This was even more prevalent in the case of indigenous women in the mountains, since indigenous men, generally of high rank, could speak Spanish and maintained control of their communities in this way. The spread of Spanish as an official language was a process that continued with the republic and if there had been no intention to do so, the process could have been reversed or language changed, as was the case in the Philippines. One of the people who most advocated and did for this process at the regional level without a doubt was Andrés Bello, who would link the Castilian grammar, full of Americanisms, an empirical philosophy, literary analysis, the civil code and a cosmology treatise, all in Spanish to tie the information with the language and make it the basis of the law. In Ecuador, the most prominent linguist and would also be a saint of the Church would be precisely Brother Miguel. Juan Montalvo's fondness for the language and his writings promoting Castilian in a secular way is also well known, to make him independent from the Catholic Church were very important in the history of Ecuador. To all this would be added the important role of Aurelio Espinosa Pólit to translate the Greco-Roman classics into Spanish and worry about their dissemination and staging. In this sense, his translation of Virgil is a milestone in the history of Castilian in Ecuador. His efforts were continued by Hernán Rodríguez Castelo, one of the most prolific writers in Ecuador and a polymath who within his writings would also dedicate some volumes to linguistics such as his "Manual of Rhetoric", "Manual of Spelling", "Practical Treaty of Punctuation" and "Elementary Grammar of Spanish". Finally, it is important to highlight the work of José Rumazo who would write one of the most extensive poems in Spanish called Parusía.

== Toponyms and etymology in dead languages ==
Due to the large number of indigenous languages that were lost due to the spread of Kichwa during the Inca conquest, many place names lack official meaning in Ecuador and are the subject of etymological speculations:

- Antisana: in Cañari language, it means 'lamb' or 'dark mountain'.
- Ayangue: name of a beach, its meaning is unknown and it is popularly called "Pacific pool". It is believed that it was the name of a Manteño chief. The Manteño language is lost.
- Babahoyo: name that comes from the Chorrera culture and means 'dark hawloon'.
- Cayambe: according to the book Montañas del Sol (see references) the name Cayambe comes from the Panzaleo language. In this language cay means 'young' and bi, 'water' or 'source of life'.
- Chimborazo: possibly from the Cayapa shimbu, which means 'Great lady of the snow'.
- Chipipe: Salinas beach, its name derives from the aboriginal word "Chepite", which is how the place was known in 1820.
- Chone: name of the river that refers to the Chono culture, or Milagro Quevedo, whose language was lost.
- Cotopaxi: it is speculated that it may come from an aboriginal Caribbean language that means 'king of death'.
- Quito: its meaning in Panzaleo is unknown, it is usually called "quitsato" in the Tsafiqui language. It can have meaning in Puquina, another dead language of Bolivia, or in Quechua, referring to the black-winged ground dove, but its etymology has not been identified.
- Guapondelig: 'plain as big as the sky' in Cañari.
- Guayaquil: name of the cacique of the Chono, whose tongue is lost, called Guayaquile.
- Imbabura: according to González Suárez, the primitive passage of the Caribbeans through the highlands was revealed in the names they gave to mountains, rivers and various places where they predominated. In this case I-am-hura means 'elevated site from which the water is born'.
- Illinizas: the northern Illiniza is known as Tiopniza and the southern Illiniza as Illiniza. Both words supposedly come from the Atacameño language of Chile and Argentina and mean, respectively, 'male hill' and 'female hill'.
- Manabi: Cancebí, name of the indigenous tribe that lived there, whose language was lost.
- Machalilla: beach that refers to the homonymous culture called Machalilla.
- Machala: this city should have been originally called "Mah-Chal", a term of Quiché origin that translated means 'noble' or 'great lindero'.
- Pichincha: unknown meaning in the Panzaleo language, related to other words such as Pillallau, Pichicay (which means bath made on the fifth day). In tsafiqui it is speculated that it is called pi 'water', chin 'cry', cha 'good'. For this reason he would be called 'the good one who makes you cry.' It may have meaning in the Quichua language, referring to the Andean sparrow, but its etymology has not been identified.
- Quilotoa: in Puruhá (by the suffix Toa) means Kiro Toa or 'the princess's tooth'
- Salango: name of a beach, originates in a ceremonial center in which considerable amounts of shell would have been processed.

== See also ==
- Ecuadorian Spanish
