= List of extinct languages of South America =

Extinct languages of South America

Language Endangerment Status by UNESCO Atlas of the World's Languages in Danger category

Extinct (EX)
- Extinct (EX): (lists)

Endangered
- Critically Endangered (CR); Severely Endangered (SE); Definitely Endangered (DE); Vulnerable (VU): (list); (list); (list); (list)

Safe
- Safe (NE): no list
- Other categories
- Revived (RE); Constructed (CL): (list); (list)
- Related topics: Atlas of the World's Languages in Danger; Endangered Languages Project; Ethnologue; Unclassified language; List of languages by total number of speakers
- UNESCO Atlas of the World's; Languages in Danger categories

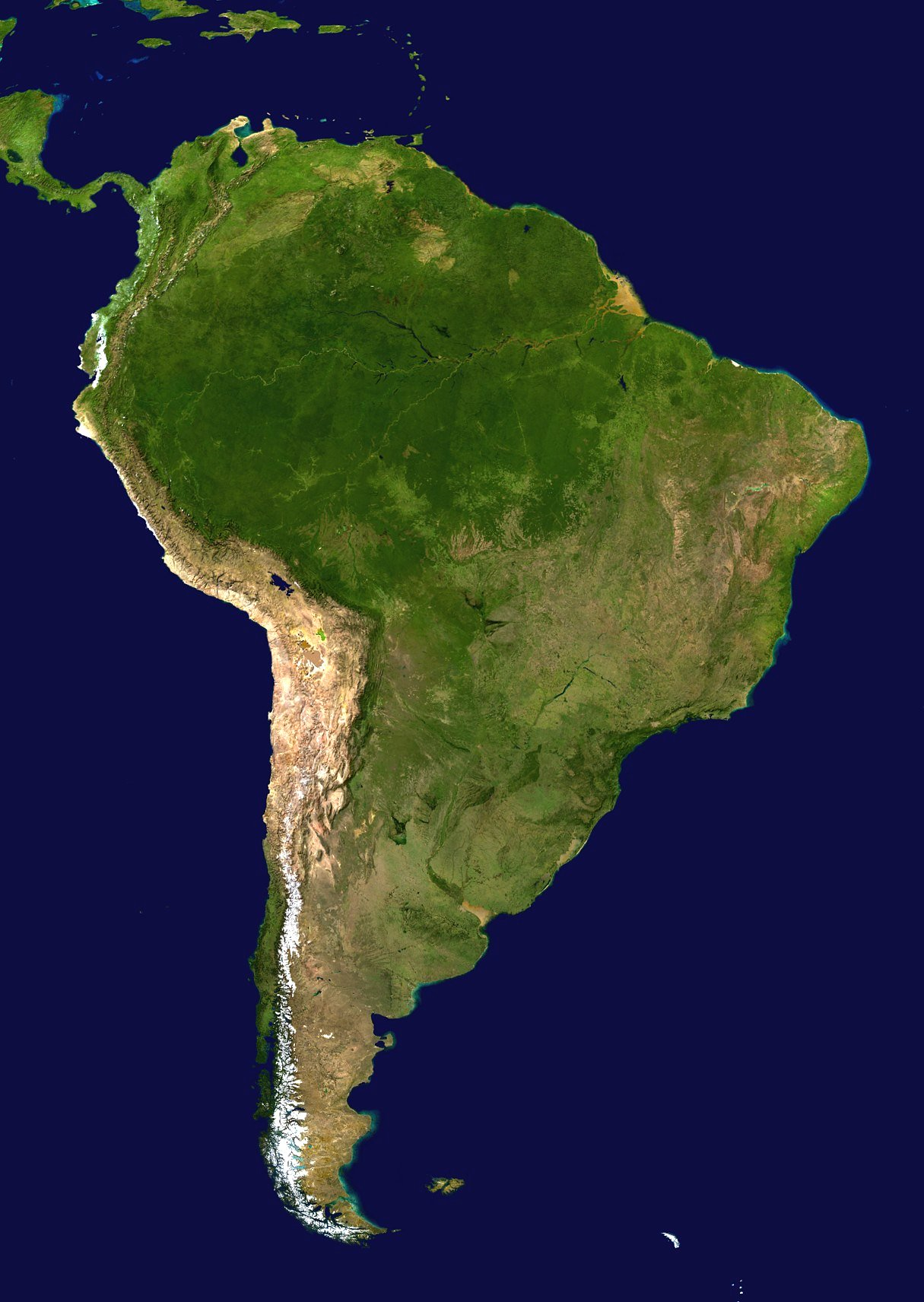

This article is a list of languages and dialects that have no native speakers, no spoken descendants, and that diverged from their parent language in South America.

There are 176 languages listed.

== Argentina ==
According to Ethnologue 2024, the following languages of Argentina are currently believed or confirmed to be extinct:

- Abipón
- Chané
- Lule
- Selkʼnam
- Puelche
- Vilela
- Yámana

== Bolivia ==
- Canichana
- Cayubaba
- Chane
- Itene
- Saraveca
- Sirinó

== Brazil ==
Ethnologue 2024 classifies the following Brazilian languages as extinct:

- Acroá
- Agavotaguerra
- Alapmunte
- Ararandewára
- Arikem
- Aruá
- Aurá
- Kagwahiva
- Kaingáng
- Kamakã
- Kepkiriwát
- Koropó
- Máku
- Oti
- Otuke
- Pawishiana
- Tukumanféd
- Tupinambá
- Tuxináwa
- Urumi
- Wiraféd
- Yalakalore

== Chile ==
- Kakauhua
- Chono
- Selkʼnam

== Colombia ==
- Aarufi
- Andaqui
- Anserma
- Arma-Pozo
- Atanque
- Atunceta
- Barbacoas
- Cabre
- Calamari
- Chibcha
- Chitarero
- Ciaman
- Coanoa
- Cospique
- Duit
- Envuelto
- Guaca
- Guanaca
- Guane
- Guenta
- Hacaritama
- Idabaez
- Irra
- Jamundi
- Jitirijiti
- Lache
- Lili
- Macaguaje
- Masaya
- Mompox
- Morcote
- Muzo
- Nori
- Old Catio
- Opón
- Otegua
- Panche
- Pantágora
- Malibú
- Moconá
- Nutabe
- Pacabuey
- Papale
- Pasto
- Pijao
- Pubenza
- Quimbaya
- Quindío
- Sinú
- Tama
- Tamaní
- Tegua
- Timaná
- Yalcón
- Yamesí
- Yariguí
- Yauna
- Yenmu
- Yurumanguí
- Yupuá
- Zamirua

== Ecuador ==
- Bolona
- Campaces
- Canelo
- Cañar
- Caranqui
- Colima
- Esmeralda
- Huacavilca
- Malaba
- Rabona
- Malacato
- Manta
- Palta
- Panzaleo
- Puná
- Puruhá
- Quijo
- Quillacinga
- Xiroa
- Yumbo

== French Guiana ==
- Yaio

== Guyana ==
- Skepi Creole Dutch
- Berbice Creole Dutch

== Peru ==
- Aguano
- Andoa
- Atsahuaca
- Aushiri
- Bagua
- Catacao
- Chacha
- Chira
- Chirino
- Cholón
- Colán
- Conambo
- Copallén
- Culle
- Hibito
- Maynas
- Mochica
- Nocaman
- Olmos
- Omurano
- Panobo
- Puquina
- Remo
- Pantanagua
- Patagón
- Quingnam
- Sácata
- Sechura
- Sensi
- Tabancale
- Tallán
- Tequiraca
- Yameo

== Southern Cone ==
- Kunza (Argentina & Chile)
- Yahgan (Argentina & Chile)

== Uruguay ==
- Charrúa
- Güenoa

== Venezuela ==
- Anauyá
- Betoi
- Cumanagoto
- Máku
- Mainatari
- Maipure
- Otomaco
- Paraujano
- Tamanaku
- Taparita
- Yavitero

== See also ==
- Extinct languages of the Marañón River basin
- List of unclassified languages of South America
- List of indigenous languages of South America
