= Cañari language =

Extinct language of Ecuador

Cañari
- Native to: Ecuador
- Region: Ecuadoran Andes
- Ethnicity: Cañari
- Extinct: early Colonial era
- Language family: Barbacoan ?: Cañari–Puruhá; Cañari

Language codes
- ISO 639-3: None (mis)
- Glottolog: cana1260
- Linguasphere: 84-AAA-ba

Cañari or Cañar is a poorly-attested extinct language of the Marañón River basin in Ecuador which is difficult to classify, apart from being apparently related to Puruhá, though it may have been Barbacoan. (See Cañari–Puruhá languages.) It was the original language of the Cañari people before its replacement by Kichwa and later Spanish.

== History ==
The Cañari were originally a collection of independent chiefdoms united by a common language, and occupied a territory from the southern border of modern-day Chimborazo Province to the Jubones River in Loja Province. However, beginning in the late 15th century, the Inca Empire conquered and resettled the Cañari in the mitma system. By the late Inca period, it was reported that between 50,000 and 70,000 Cañari had been resettled in Cusco; conversely, an estimated half of the population of Cañar by Spanish contact had been relocated from Peru and Bolivia. During the Inca Civil War, the Cañari sided with Huáscar, leading to "genocidal" reprisal against them by the rival Atahualpa, who had tens of thousands of Cañari killed. The further Spanish conquest of the region also worsened the demographics of the Cañari; disease and forced labor led to two-thirds of the Cañari dying by the end of the 16th century. They were also further displaced as they aided the Spaniards in the conquest of the Inca Empire. The Cañari language was still being used into the colonial period, as in 1594, Bishop Luis López de Solís ordered Christian doctrines to be translated into Cañari.

== Phonology ==
The following tentative phonology given below is from Howard (2010).

		Labial	Alveolar	Palatal	Velar
Stop	voiceless	p	t		k
Stop	voiced	b	d		g
Affricate				ch	
Fricative	voiceless		s	sh	x
Fricative	voiced		z	zh	
Nasal		m	n	ñ	ŋ
Vibrant			r		
Lateral			l	ll	
Semivowel		w		y	

=== Phonotactics ===
In contrast to other languages of the region, Cañari apparently allowed around 10 consonants in the coda position; /k/, /g/~/x/, /n/, /t/, /d/, /s/, /y/, /w/, /l/, and /ɾ/, similar to Guambiano and Awa Pit.

== Vocabulary ==
=== Jijón y Caamaño (1940) ===
Plant names in Cañari
gloss	Cañari
tree with multicolored seeds like beans	cañaro
a flower	aroc
a fruit	gualla

=== Cañari substratum in Cañar Quichua ===
==== Howard (2010) ====
Some lexical items found in Cañar Quichua collected from various sources and fieldwork are given below. In the columns from the sources, a plus sign indicates that it is present, while a minus sign indicates non-presence.

Fieldwork	Cordero	Cordero Palacios	Gloss
azhan	+	-	face up
chinzhina	+ 'light breakfast at daybreak'	+	have breakfast
gaza	-	-	ambling in a dejected way
guzhgurina	+ 'gain something without deserving it (e.g. of food)	-	enjoy oneself
guzu	+	+	marsh
huizhi	+ 'soot'	+ huizhina 'to ignite'	embers
jizi	+	+	smiling, laughing
pizhu	-	+	wrinkled
puzha	+ 'fine leaf dust, fibrous dirt'	+ 'dirt'	mote of dust, dirt
tuzu	+	+ 'morally deflated'	hunched, shrivelled (of a person)
zharpi	+	+	roughly ground corn
zharu	+	+	roughly ground corn
zhima	+	+ 'soft, textured corn'	pearl-coloured variety of corn
zhinki	-	-	poorly physically developed (of a child)
zhiru	+	+	grey
zhuru	+	+	pockmarked
zula	+	-	fruit that has not grown well (especially of corn)
zupu	+	-	swollen-footed through disease
cuzha	+	+	bird's nest
cuzhana	+	+ cuzhani	to nest
huizhu	+ 'bush of the Malva family'	+ 'Ternstroemia meridionalis'	plant name
zhuta	-	-	bird
cuzu	+	+	larva, worm
puzun	+	+	stomach, large stomach of cows
guzhgui	+	+	eucalyptus seed, spinning top
jazha	+	+	jaw

==== Urban (2018) ====
According to Urban (2018), modern-day Cañar Quichua (spoken in Cañar Province, Ecuador) has a Cañari substratum, which can be seen in the phonology and lexicon of the dialect. Below is a list of Cañar Quichua words with Barbacoan lexical parallels, and hence likely to be words of Cañari origin. The words were compiled by Urban (2018) from Cordero (1895), Cordero Palacios (1923), and Paris (1961), and are compared in the table below to words the Barbacoan languages Totoró, Cha'palaa, and Tsafiki as well as Proto-Barbacoan reconstructions.

Cañar Quichua			Barbacoan				Gloss
Cordero	Cordero Palacios	Paris	Proto-Barbacoan	Totoró	Cha'palaa	Tsafiki	Gloss
izhi ‘fog, very light drizzle’	izhin ‘drizzle’	izhi	*iʃ ‘smoke'				‘fog/smoke’
putu[l]			*pɨt(ɨ) (Urban's own reconstruction)				‘rotten’
pachi ‘kind of tree of the eastern highlands’			*tsik ‘tree, stick'				‘kind of tree’
[chuchip]chi ‘kind of small tree’	[chuchip]chi ‘kind of plant, Abatia verbascifolia		*tsik ‘tree, stick'				‘kind of tree’
[pil]chi	[pil]chi ‘kind of plant, Crescentia cujete’	[pil]chi ‘vessel, junk made of coco, calabash’	*tsik ‘tree, stick'				‘calabash tree’
nunchi			*tsik ‘tree, stick'				‘kind of shrub’
chipu ‘a kind of insect that jumps’		chipu ‘locust’			chijpi ‘flea'	chi’pın ‘flea’	‘a kind of insect that jumps’
mulu ‘rustic plate, made of clay and without adornment’	mulu					milan	‘plate’
chiru ‘orangutan [sic!]’					churi		‘monkey’
cuylan ‘small lizard’	cuilan	cuilan ~ cullan ‘small lizard’		kalun[c’i] (Vasquez de Ruiz 2009)			‘lizard’
		sutu, zzutu				su’tu ‘inserted, put between’	‘knot’
		zzuyu				suyun ‘rainbow’	‘dusk’
palu	palu	palu				[lan]palo ‘common lizard’	‘lizard’
pu[nya]- ‘stink excessively, emit a nauseating smell’					pu[dyu] ‘smelling badly'	pu[ba]- ‘smelly’	‘smell, stink’
piri ‘light scabies’	piri ‘vile, despicable, mangy’	piri ‘light scabies, grain mold’		⟨pirr[sureg]⟩, ⟨pirr[sé]⟩ ‘lepra’ (Otero 1952: 317, 310)			‘skin disease’
palti	palti ‘height, lookout (?)’		*tɨ ‘firewood’	pala ‘high, up’ (Vasquez de Ruiz 2009)			‘platform built in high place’
tulu	tulu	tulu		tolo ‘bag'			‘sack or bag’
taba ‘rubbish consisting of branches and leaves which covers rocky regions’	taba ‘scrub, place full of scrub’	taba ‘mosquito, rubbish, tangle’			tape ‘grass’	ta’pe ‘grass, bush’	‘vegetable waste/grass’
cuzu ‘larva of some insects’	cussu ‘larva of beetle (?!)’	kuzu ‘thick worm, found especially in potatoes’		ku’ʃi ‘worm'			‘larva/worm’
punzu		punzu ‘rubbish, tow, fine straw’				pu’chu ‘rest'	‘fine straw, tow-like rubbish’
pu[zha]	pu[zha] ‘stalk, rubbish’						‘small leaves, fibrous rubbish’
pichi ‘red, crimson, scarlet’		pichi ‘red, crimson’		piku(ˈtik), piki(tik) (Vasquez de Ruiz 2009)			‘red’
pilis ‘body louse of human or animals’	pilis ‘body louse’	pilis ‘body louse’		palekˈtɨ			‘louse’
malta ‘small clay jug to store or sell chicha’		malta ‘small jug made of fired clay’				mala ‘sugar cane juice, chicha’	‘(vessel for) chicha’
jizi ‘laughing, one who laughs without discretion’	jissi	jizi ‘laughing’					‘laugh’
chas ‘spontaneous growth of potatoes in an already harvested field’							‘field’ (?)
		batiuc ‘lamb’				ba’tu fu ‘freshly grown hair’	‘fresh, young’ (?)
		munzhi ‘naughty, playful, restless’					‘naughty, playful, restless’
