= Paezan languages =

Hypothetical language family of Colombia and Ecuador

Paezan (also Páesan, Paezano, Interandine) may be any of several hypothetical or obsolete language-family proposals of Colombia and Ecuador named after the Paez language.

== Proposals ==
Currently, Páez (Nasa Yuwe) is best considered either a language isolate or the only surviving member of an otherwise extinct language family. It has often been grouped with other languages in a Paezan family, but several of these proposals are based on a historical error involving Guambiano. Even before the discovery of the error, Lyle Campbell stated, "There is no consensus upon Paezan, and opinions vary greatly".

=== Páez, Panzaleo, Andaquí ===
Paezan
- (hypothetical)
- Geographic distribution: Colombia, Ecuador
- Linguistic classification: Proposed language family
- Subdivisions: Paez; Panzaleo †; Andaquí †

Language codes
- Glottolog: None

One of the most often repeated statements is the supposed connection between Páez and the extinct Panzaleo (also known as Pansaleo, Latacunga, or Quito), formerly spoken in highlands of Ecuador. However, Panzaleo is poorly documented and the evidence for this relationship is weak and may be from language contact. Thus, Panzaleo may best be considered an unclassified language.

The Andaquí isolate (also extinct) is often connected with Páez in a Paezan grouping. Documentation is a 20-page list of words and expressions by an anonymous author published in 1928 and another word list collected in 1854 by a priest (Manuel María Albis). There are a number of similarities in vocabulary between Andaquí and Páez, as noted by Jolkesky and Adelaar and Muysken. In other aspects, the differences are greater.

Jolkesky also found lexical similarities with Tinigua.

=== Páez–Coconucan ===
Paez–Coconucan
- (spurious)
- Geographic distribution: Colombia, Ecuador
- Linguistic classification: Proposed language family
- Subdivisions: Paez–Panzaleo; Andaquí; Coconucan

Language codes
- Glottolog: None

The Coconucan languages were first grouped together with Páez by Henri Beuchat & Paul Rivet in 1910 (under a larger Chibchan family, which is considerably more inclusive than the conservative Chibchan recognized today). Curnow shows this is based on misinterpretation of a Moguex vocabulary of Douay, which is a mix of Páez and Guambiano/Totoró. The error has led to subsequent classifiers to group Páez with Guambiano, missing the obvious identification of Coconucan as Barbacoan. Additionally, the term 'Moguex' can be treated as a synonym of Guambiano.

Matteson's 1972 comparison of Páez and Guambiano vocabularies show just a 5.2% overlap, less than comparisons between Páez and Arawak, Quechua and Proto-Chibchan (respectively 17%, 12%, and 14%). Following linguists such as Matteson, Curnow, Curnow & Liddicoat, and Adelaar & Muysken (2004), the Coconucan languages are now placed under Barbacoan. The question of connections between Páez, Panzaleo, and Andaquí, as mentioned above, remains open.

Ethnologue groups Coconucan (with Anserma and Caramanta, two Chocoan languages) with Paez and Andaqui in a Paezan family.

=== More distant relations ===
Prior to Curnow's correction, the Paez–Coconucan "family" had been connected to various other families. Greenberg included Paezan in a Macro-Chibchan (or Chibchan–Paezan) stock with Barbacoan, Chibchan, Chocoan, Jirajaran, and the isolates Betoi, Kamsá (Sibundoy), Yaruro, Esmeraldeño, Mochica, Cunza (Atacameño), Itonama, and Yurumanguí. Morris Swadesh's Paezan included Páez, Barbacoan, Coconucan, Andaquí, Cunza, Kapixana, and Mashubí. Kaufman's (1990, 1994) Macro-Páesan "cluster" proposal included "Paesan" (as explained above)–Barbacoan, Cunza–Kapixana, Betoi, Itonama, and Warao.

== See also ==
- Páez language
- Barbacoan languages
- Páez people
- Macro-Paesan languages

== Bibliography ==
- Adelaar, Willem F. H.; Muysken, Pieter C. (2004). The languages of the Andes. Cambridge language surveys. Cambridge University Press.
- Beuchat, Henri; Rivet, Paul (1910). "Affinités des langues du sud de la Colombie et du nord de l'Équateur". Le Mouséon. 11: 33–68, 141–198.
- Branks, Judith; Sánchez, Juan Bautista (1978). The drama of life: A study of life cycle customs among the Guambiano, Colombia, South America. Summer Institute of Linguistics Museum of Anthropology Publication (No. 4). Dallas: Summer Institute of Linguistics Museum of Anthropology. pp. xii, 107.
- Brend, Ruth M., ed. (1985). From phonology to discourse: Studies in six Colombian languages. Language Data, Amerindian Series (No. 9). Dallas: Summer Institute of Linguistics. pp. vi, 133.
- Campbell, Lyle (1997). American Indian languages: The historical linguistics of Native America. New York: Oxford University Press. ISBN 0-19-509427-1.
- Constenla Umaña, Adolfo (1981). Comparative Chibchan phonology (Doctoral thesis). University of Pennsylvania.
- Constenla Umaña, Adolfo (1991). Las lenguas del área intermedia: Introducción a su estudio areal. San José: Editorial de la Universidad de Costa Rica.
- Constenla Umaña, Adolfo (1993). "La familia chibcha". In Rodríguez de Montes, M. L. (ed.). Estado actual de la classificación de las lenguas indígenas de Colombia. Bogotá: Instituto Caro y Cuervo. pp. 75–125.
- Curnow, Timothy J. (1998). "Why Paez is not a Barbacoan language: The nonexistence of 'Moguex' and the use of early sources". International Journal of American Linguistics. 64 (4): 338–351.
- Curnow, Timothy J.; Liddicoat, Anthony J. (1998). "The Barbacoan languages of Colombia and Ecuador". Anthropological Linguistics. 40 (3).
- Douay, Léon (1888). "Contribution à l'américanisme du Cauca (Colombie)". Compte-Rendu du Congrès International des Américanistes. 7: 763–786.
- Fabre, Alain (2005). Diccionario etnolingüístico y guía bibliográfica de los pueblos indígenas sudamericanos. (To appear).
- Greenberg, Joseph H. (1960). "General classification of Central and South American languages". In Wallace, A. (ed.). Men and cultures: Fifth international congress of anthropological and ethnological sciences (1956). Philadelphia: University of Pennsylvania Press. pp. 791–794.
- Greenberg, Joseph H. (1987). Language in the Americas. Stanford: Stanford University Press.
- Heinze, Carol, ed. (1978). Estudios chibchas 2. Serie Sintáctica (No. 9). Bogota: Ministerio de Gobierno and Instituto Lingüístico de Verano. pp. iv, 140.
- Kaufman, Terrence (1990). "Language history in South America: What we know and how to know more". In Payne, D. L. (ed.). Amazonian linguistics: Studies in lowland South American languages. Austin: University of Texas Press. pp. 13–67. ISBN 0-292-70414-3.
- Kaufman, Terrence (1994). "The native languages of South America". In Mosley, C.; Asher, R. E. (eds.). Atlas of the world's languages. London: Routledge. pp. 46–76.
- Key, Mary R. (1979). The grouping of South American languages. Tübingen: Gunter Narr Verlag.
- Landaburu, Jon (1993). "Conclusiones del seminario sobre classificación de lenguas indígenas de Colombia". In Rodríguez de Montes, M. L. (ed.). Estado actual de la classificación de las lenguas indígenas de Colombia. Bogotá: Instituto Caro y Cuervo. pp. 313–330.
- Loukotka, Čestmír (1968). Classification of South American Indian languages. Los Angeles: Latin American Studies Center, University of California.
