= Muellamués language =

Extinct Barbacoan language of Colombia

Muellamués
- Native to: Colombia
- Extinct: (date missing)
- Language family: Barbacoan: Awan; Pasto–Muellamués; Muellamués

Language codes
- ISO 639-3: None (mis)
- Glottolog: muel1234
- Linguasphere: 81-HAA-bb

Muellamués is an extinct Barbacoan language of Colombia, possibly a dialect of Pasto. According to Sergio Elías Ortiz (1965), there was historically never a "Muellamués language" and is an "arbitrary name" given to a vocabulary of Kechwa-Kwaiker.

== Vocabulary ==
Muellamués vocabulary
gloss	Muellamués
sun	inde
moon	cuaquilla
boy	pass
water	juelam
salt	yam
candle	in
horse	patacuar
dog	cuesané
pig	incochiné
hen	atahualné
banana	palnapusné
maize, barley, grain in general	piar
stone	pegrané
