= Totoro language =

Extinct language of Colombia

Totoró
- namtrik
- Pronunciation: [namˈʐix]
- Native to: Colombia
- Region: Cauca Department
- Native speakers: 76 (2019)
- Language family: Barbacoan languages: Northern; Coconucan; Totoró

Language codes
- ISO 639-3: ttk
- Glottolog: toto1306
- ELP: Totoró
- Linguasphere: 81-GAA-ba
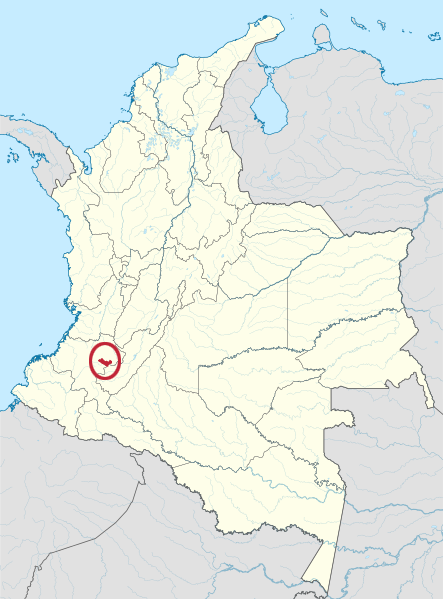
- Map of where Totoró was spoken in Colombia

- Totoró is classified as Critically Endangered by the UNESCO Atlas of the World's Languages in Danger

Totoro or Totoró is a Barbacoan language spoken in southwestern Colombia, in Cauca Department by the Totoró people, who number about 1,000 people. Four known speakers of the language were recorded in 1998, but 76 speakers were reported in 2019.

== Classification ==
Totoro, along with Guambiano and the long-extinct Coconuco language, forms a subgroup of the Barbacoan languages. These language varieties are sometimes considered to be dialects of one Coconucan language.

Within the Barbacoan family, Coconucan and Awa Pit constitute the northern branch of it.

== Bibliography ==
- Curnow, Timothy Jowan; Liddicoat, Anthony J. (1998). "The Barbacoan Languages of Colombia and Ecuador". Anthropological Linguistics. 40 (3): 384–408. ISSN 0003-5483. JSTOR 30028647.
- (es) Geny Gonzales Castaño, « “Nosotros teníamos que ser diferentes” Apuntes para una reflexión sobre el alfabeto de la lengua nam trik », dans Tulio Rojas Curieux, Corpus lingüístico : estudio y aplicación en revitalización de lenguas indígenas, Popayán, Universidad del Cauca, 2017 (lire en ligne), p. 103-128
