= Chachi people =

Ecuadorian ethnic group

Chachi people (also Cayapas) are an ethnic group who live in the rainforest area of northwestern Esmeraldas on the northern coast of Ecuador. They live by the Cayapas River in the Centro El Encanto, a section of the Cotacachi Cayapas Ecological Reserve, as do Afro Ecuadorian people; the two groups have co-existed in the forest for about 400 years. There were approximately 5,000 Chachi in 2003.

== History ==
According to Chachi oral tradition, they originated in Imbabura Province in the mountains near Ibarra, fleeing after the Castilian invasion and spent time in Chimborazo. They were forced to settle in the area after the Spanish conquest of Ibarra, which led them to move to Esmeraldas. They have traditionally been known as Cayapas (Cay, meaning "son"; Apa, meaning "father"). However, after rejecting the term "Father's Son", from 1978, the people have been called Chachi ("pure"). The Chachi speak a Barbacoan language named Cayapa. Linguistically, their closest living relatives are the Tsachila people of Ecuador. Today, they inhabit the river valleys of the Cayapas, Canandé, and Muisne Rivers in Esmeraldas Province.

== Culture ==
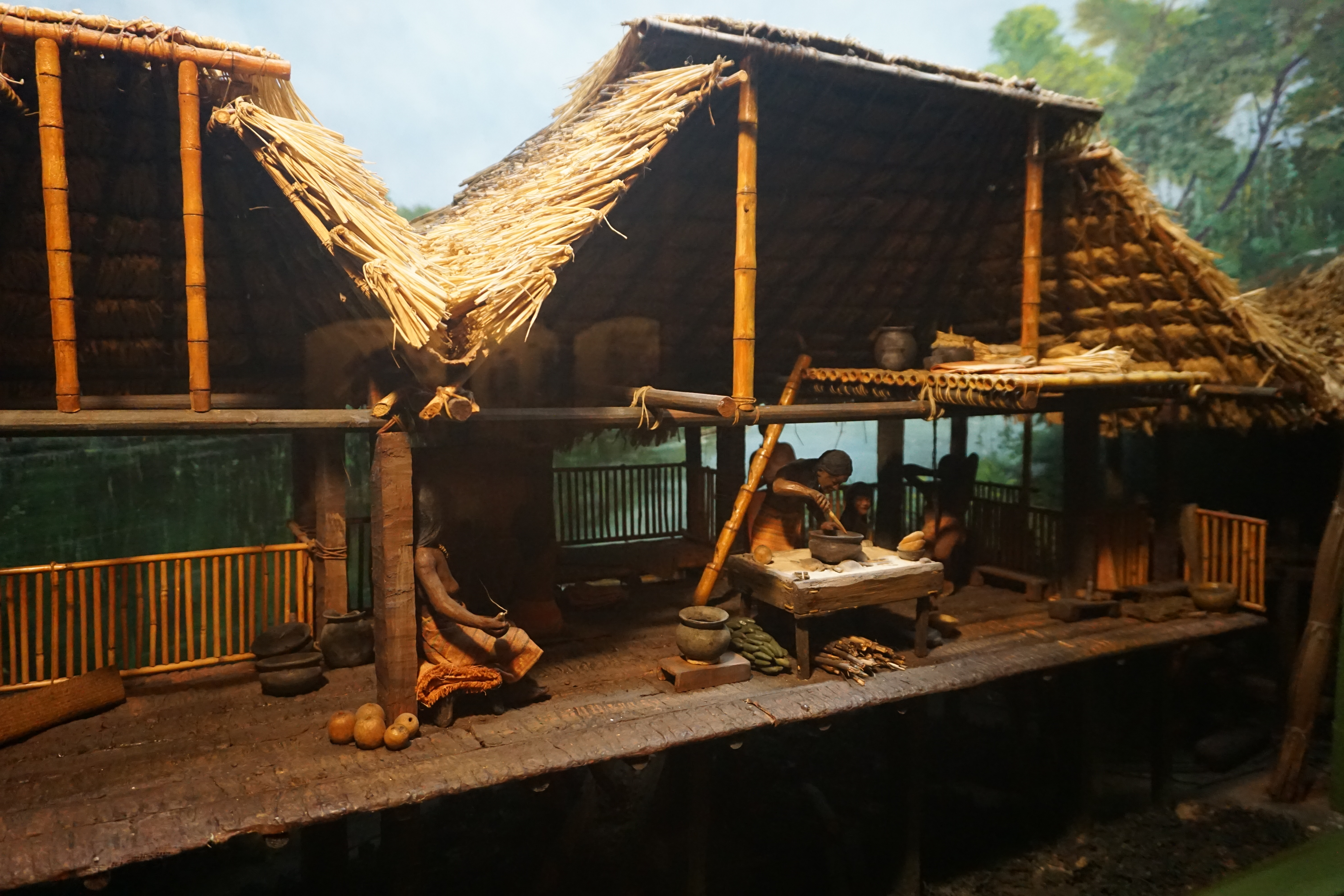
The A Pilehouse in the Tropics: Cayapa diorama at the Milwaukee Public Museum

Chachi people are characterized as being marginalized and poor. Homes are built on stilts with sides and a roof of thatch. Women's clothing includes a loose skirt with a sash at the waist while men wear a long shirt with pants; both men and women have bare chests. Since colonization, Chachi have converted to Catholicism. The group's leader is known as "Uni" while the "Chaitalas" hold a lesser role. The canoe provides a means of transportation. Bark is used to form a kind of paper or fabric. Their economy is based on traditional subsistence agriculture and fishing. However, the Chachi are well noted for their basketwork, and they sell their craft items in stalls in Borbón, Limones, Esmeraldas and Quito.
