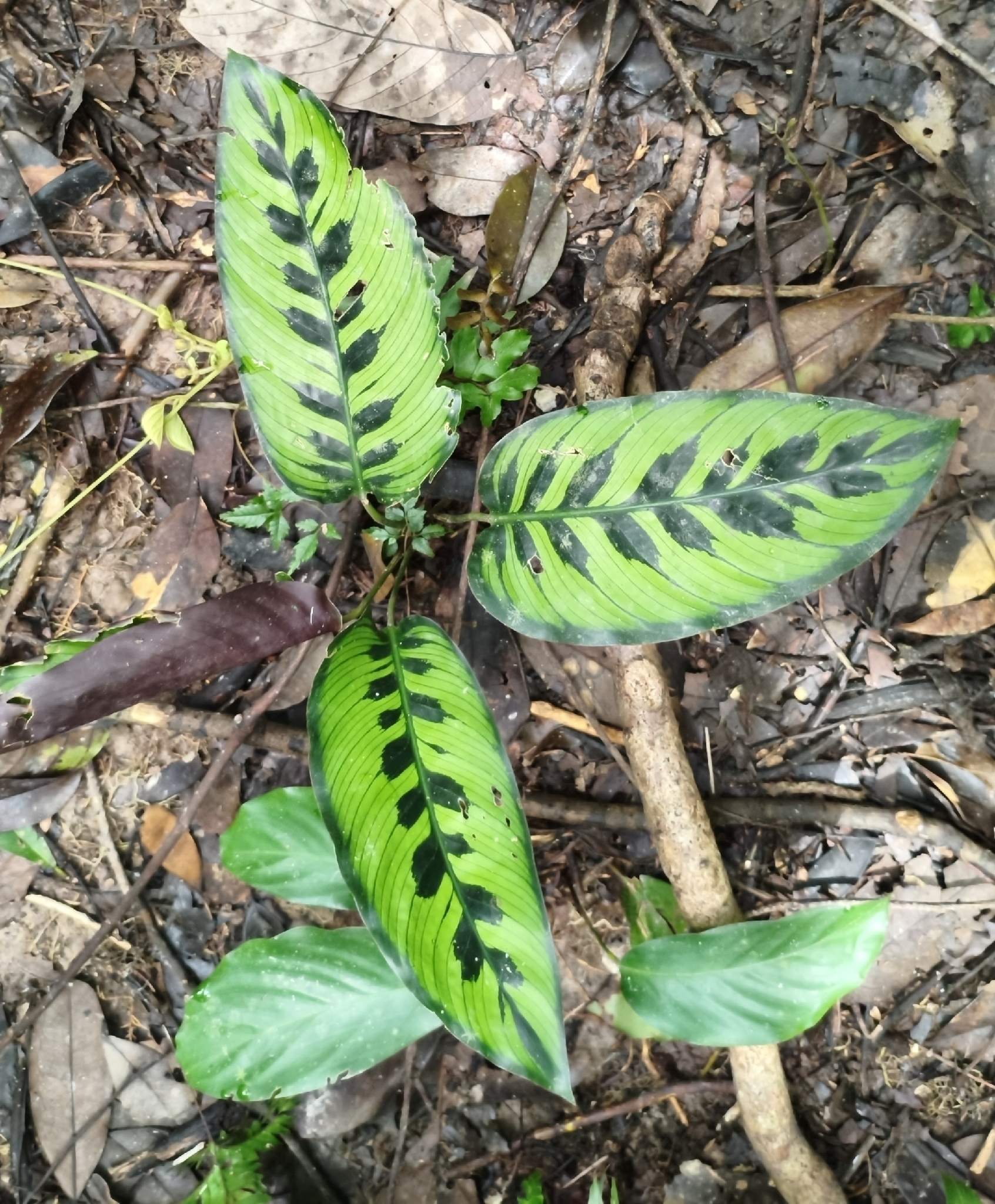

Scientific classification
- Kingdom: Plantae
- Clade: Tracheophytes
- Clade: Angiosperms
- Clade: Monocots
- Clade: Commelinids
- Order: Zingiberales
- Family: Marantaceae
- Genus: Goeppertia
- Species: G. variegata

Binomial name
- Goeppertia variegata (K.Koch) Borchs. & S.Suárez

Synonyms
- Calathea variegata (K.Koch) Linden ex Körn.; Phrynium variegatum K.Koch; Phyllodes variegata (K.Koch) Kuntze; Calathea riedeliana (Didr.) K.Schum., nom. illeg. homonym. post.; Maranta riedeliana (Didr.) Körn.; Phrynium jucundum Pynaert; Phrynium riedelianum Didr.; Phrynium riedelii Didr.; Saranthe riedeliana (Didr.) Eichler

= Goeppertia variegata =

Species of flowering plant

Goeppertia variegata is a species of plant from the genus Goeppertia in the Marantaceae family. It is native to Bolivia, Brazil North, Colombia, Ecuador, Guyana, Peru, Suriname, Trinidad-Tobago and Venezuela. It is part of the sub-group of the genus called the Ornata clade.

== Description ==
Inflorescence of Goeppertia variegata

Goeppertia variegata is a big sized plant with huge, wide and long green leaves with long and thick petioles and a long pulvinus. The underside of the leaf can vary from green to purple. Juvenile plants have two light green bands on each side of the leaf with a dark green square-like pattern along the middle vein. This middle pattern later fades into a single thick green band, intensifying the brush pattern. Sometimes the pattern disappears completely at a very mature stage, leaving the leaves plain green. The inflorescence of Goeppertia variegata is made of numerous membranaceous bracts, which deteriorate very fast and turn into brown fiber. The flowers are big, white and creamy. The fruits of G.variegata are easily recognizable, due to their three lobed shape, their bright red color and being without persistent sepals (compared to similar species like Goeppertia pachystachya). The seeds are blue.

== Use ==
Among the Tsáchila people, the leaves of Goeppertia variegata are used for bundling things, as well as for wrapping food that is then steamed.
