= Caranqui language =

Extinct language of Ecuador

Caranqui
- Cara, Imbaya (Imbabura)
- Native to: Cara culture
- Region: Ecuador
- Extinct: 18th century?
- Language family: Barbacoan?: Southern?; Caranqui

Language codes
- ISO 639-3: None (mis)
- Glottolog: imba1237 Imbabura kara1506 Kara

Caranqui or Cara (Kara) is an extinct, probably Barbacoan language of Ecuador. Caranqui was replaced by Quechua, perhaps surviving as late as the 18th century. It seems in turn to have influenced Imbabura Quechua. There are similarities between Caranqui and the Barbacoan languages Pasto and Tsafiki, so Caranqui is often classified as Barbacoan, but the evidence is not conclusive due its poor documentation.
