= Páez language =

Indigenous language of Colombia

Páez
- Nasa Yuwe
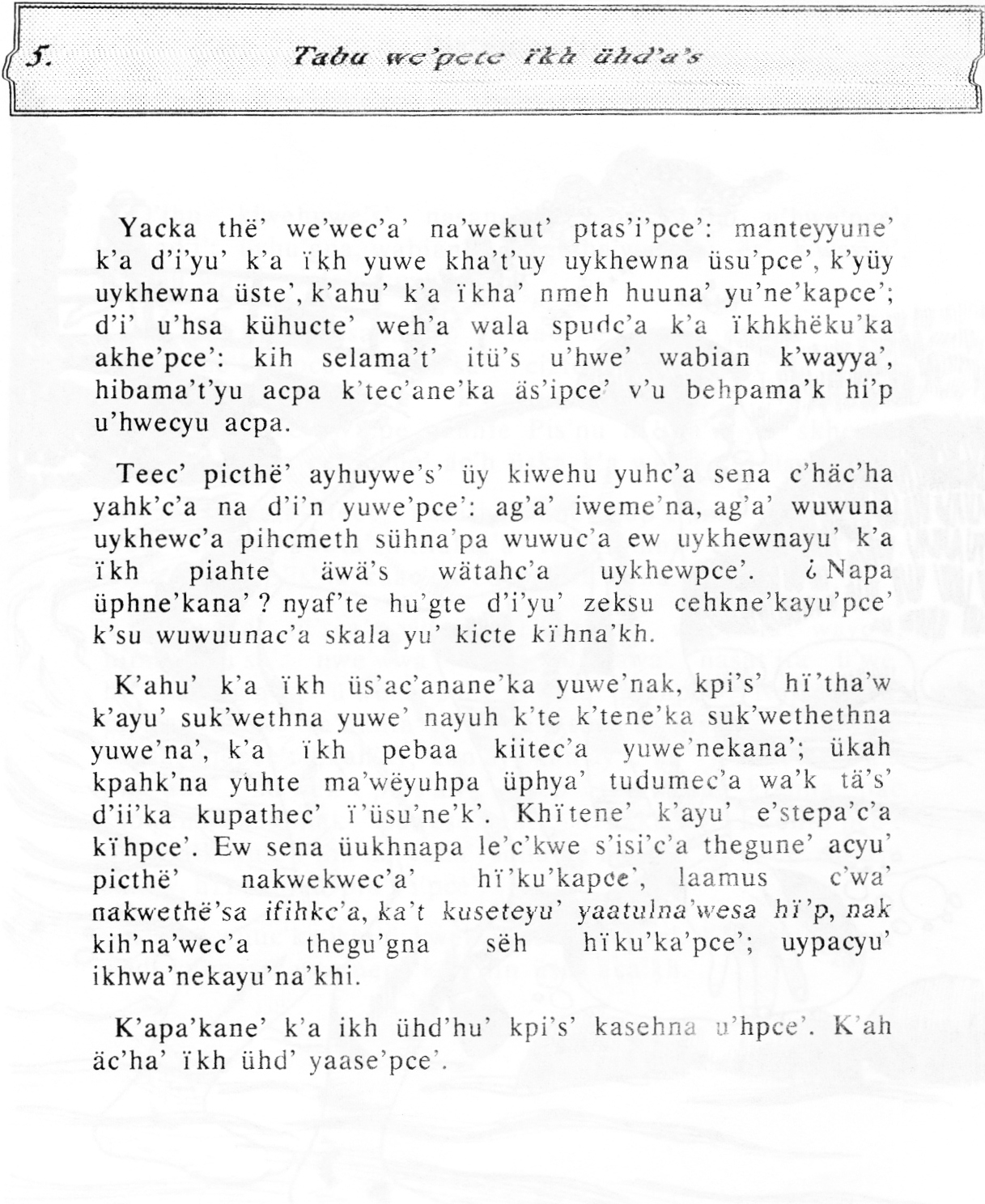
- Native to: Colombia
- Region: Andes
- Ethnicity: 243,000 Nasa (Páez) people (2019 census)
- Native speakers: 60,000 (2012)
- Language family: Paezan ?: Páez
- Dialects: Pitayo; Paniquita

Language codes
- ISO 639-3: pbb
- Glottolog: paez1247
- ELP: Paez
- Linguasphere: 81-GBA-a
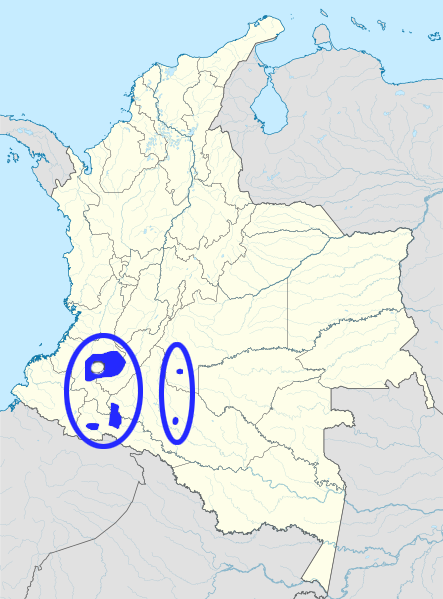

- People: Nasa
- Language: Nasa Yuwe

Páez (also Paez, Paes; or the autonym Nasa Yuwe 'Nasa language') is a language of Colombia, spoken by the Nasa (Páez) people. Crevels (2011) estimates 60,000 speakers out of an ethnic population of 140,000.

The language is spoken by the second largest Colombian indigenous community, the Nasa, in the north of the Cauca Department, in southwestern Colombia. However, the people had to move to other departments of Colombia like Huila, Tolima and Valle del Cauca.

== Classification ==
Páez is generally considered to be a language isolate, or at least the only surviving member of its family (Adelaar & Muysken 2004).

== Language contact ==
Jolkesky (2016) notes that there are lexical similarities with the Chibcha, Barbakoa, Choko, Tukano, Andaki, and Kofan language families due to contact.

== Varieties ==
Below is a full list of Paezan language varieties listed by Loukotka (1968), including names of unattested varieties.

- Paez / Paisa – the language spoken in the villages of the Paez River, the department of Huila. Dialects include:
  - Nasayuwä – spoken in the village of Pitayo.
  - Okoshkokyéwa – spoken in the village of La Peña.
  - Paniquita – spoken in some villages, Paniquita, and others, in the Huila region.
- Panzaleo / Latacunga / Quito – an extinct language once spoken in the provinces of Pichincha, Cotopaxi, and Tungurahua, Ecuador.
- Alausí – once spoken in the village of Alausí, Chimborazo province, Ecuador. (Unattested.)

== History ==
Although dozens of indigenous languages have been extinguished at the hand of the Spanish (and later Colombian) Empire, there remain more than 60 languages within the boundaries of what is now known as Colombia. Most of these languages are classified into 10 linguistic families: Chibcha, Arawak, Carib, Quechua, Tukano, Guahibo, Makú-Puinave, Bora-Witoto, Piaroa-Sáliba, and Chocó. During the 1900s, initial research suggested that Nasa Yuwe was part of the Chibcha language family, which includes Arwako, Kogi, Wiwa, Tunebo, Motilone, Chimila, and Guna. However, Nasa Yuwe is now considered to constitute a small language family of its own—the Paezan languages. Today, many Misak live in some primarily Nasa settlements creating a situation of language contact and in some cases bilingualism.

== Phonology ==
=== Vowels ===
Paez has four oral vowel phonemes: /i, e, a, u/. Each oral vowel phoneme has corresponding nasalized /ĩ ẽ ã ũ/, aspirated /iʰ eʰ aʰ uʰ/, and lengthened /iː eː aː uː/ forms, all of which are contrastive. Each vowel sound may also be laryngealized /ḭ ḛ a̰ ṵ/. Laryngealization can occur on nasalized or plain vowels, but not long vowels, while nasalization can occur to a plain or lengthened vowel. Vowel length is not contrastive in all dialects.

=== Consonants ===
Consonants
		Bilabial		Alveolar		Velar	
		plain	palatalized	plain	palatalized	plain	palatalized
Plosive	plain	p	pʲ	t	tʲ	k	kʲ
Plosive	aspirated	pʰ	pʲʰ	tʰ	tʲʰ	kʰ	kʲʰ
Plosive	prenasalized	ᵐb	ᵐbʲ	ⁿd	ⁿdʲ	ᵑɡ	ᵑɡʲ
Affricate	plain			t͡s	t͡ʃ		
Affricate	aspirated			t͡sʰ	t͡ʃʰ		
Affricate	prenasalized			ⁿd͡z	ⁿd͡ʒ		
Fricative	plain		ɸʲ	s	ʃ	x	xʲ
Fricative	voiced		βʲ				
Nasal		m		n	ɲ		
Flap	lateral			ɺ	ʎ̮		
Approximant					j	w	

== Bibliography ==
- Adelaar, Willem F. H.; & Muysken, Pieter C. (2004). The languages of the Andes. Cambridge language surveys. Cambridge University Press.
- Brend, Ruth M. (Ed.). (1985). From phonology to discourse: Studies in six Colombian languages (p. vi, 133). Language Data, Amerindian Series (No. 9). Dallas: Summer Institute of Linguistics.
- Castillo y Orozco (del), Eugenio. (1877) Vocabulario Paez–Castellano. Ezequiel Uricoechea ed. Maisonneuve y Cia. Libreros Editores, París.
- Fabre, Alain. (2005). Nasa Yuwe / Páez. Diccionario etnolingüístico y guía bibliográfica de los pueblos indígenas sudamericanos. (To appear). (Online: ).
- Gerdel, Florence L. and others. (1973). Sistemas fonológicos de idiomas colombianos 2. Bogotá: Ministerio de Gobierno and Instituto Lingüístico de Verano. 132 p.
- Gerdel, Florence L. (1979). Paez. In Aspectos de la cultura material de grupos étnicos de Colombia 2, (pp. 181–202). Bogota: Ministerio de Gobierno and Instituto Lingüístico de Verano.
- Gerdel, Florence L. and Marianna C. Slocum. (1976). Páez discourse, paragraph and sentence structure." In Robert E. Longacre and Frances Woods (eds.), Discourse grammar: Studies in indigenous languages of Colombia, Panama, and Ecuador, 1: 259–443. Summer Institute of Linguistics Publications in Linguistics and Related Fields, 52(1). Dallas: SIL and the University of Texas at Arlington.
- Nieves Oviedo, Rocío; Tulio Rojas y Marcos Yule. (1991): Estudios Fonológicos de la Lengua Paez (Nasa Yuwe); Descripciones 6; Colciencias – Universidad de los Andes, Bogotá.
- Rojas Curieux, Tulio; Roció Nieves Oviedo, y Marcos Yule Yatacue. (1991): Estudios Grammaticales de la Lengua Paez (Nasa Yuwe). Descripciones 7; Colciencias – Universidad de los Andes, Bogotá.
- Slocum, Marianna C. (1986). Gramática páez. Lomalinda: Editorial Townsend.
- Slocum, Marianna C. (1972). ¿Cómo se dice en páez?. Lomalinda: Ministerio de Gobierno.
- Slocum, Marianna C. and Florence L. Gerdel. (1983). Diccionario: páez-español / español-páez. Lomalinda: Editorial Townsend.
