= Diana Aguavil =

Ecuadorian indigenous leader

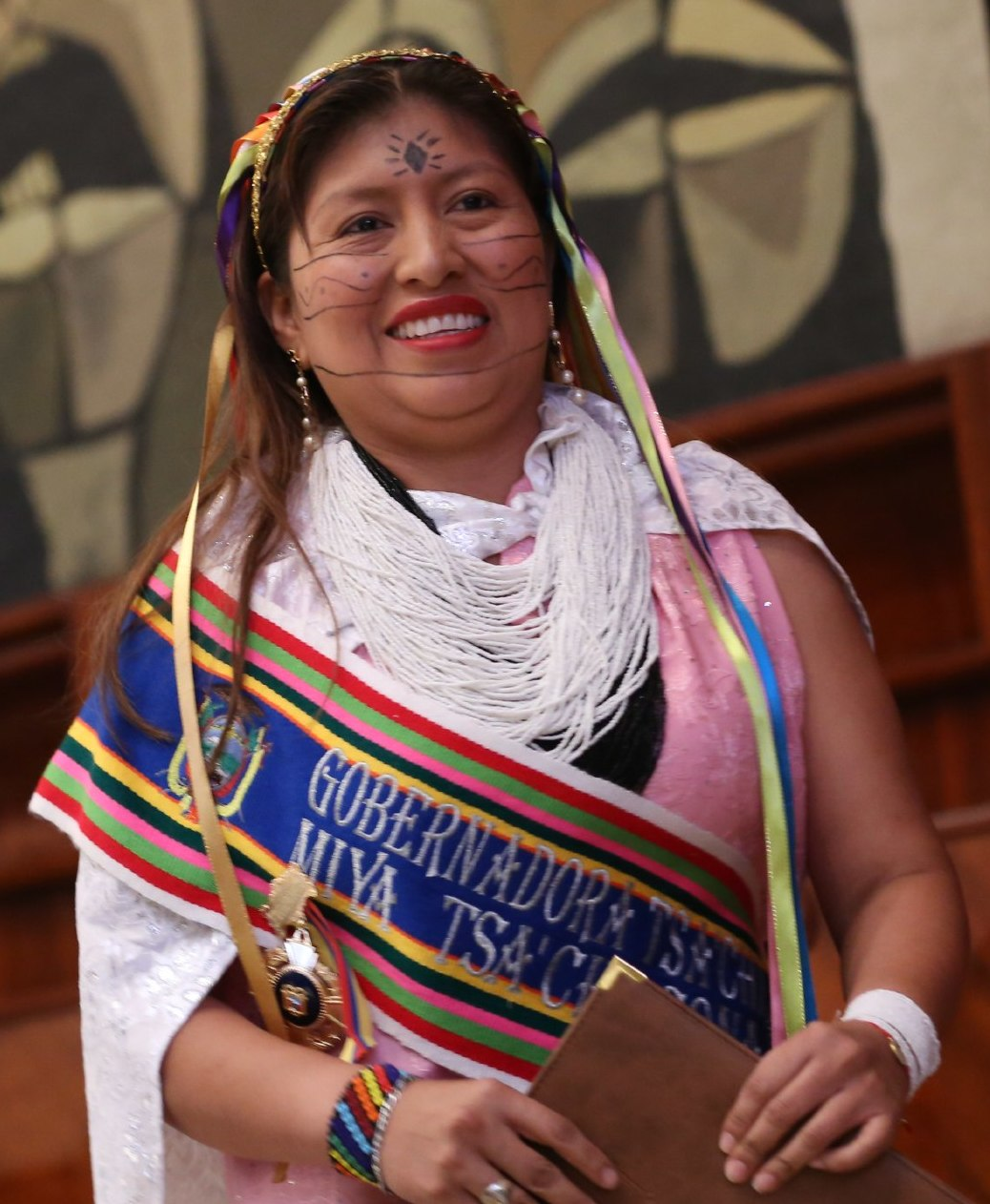
- In April 2019

Governor of Tsáchila people
- Incumbent
- Assumed office 25 August 2018
- Preceded by: Javier Aguavil

Personal details
- Born: 7 August 1983 (age 43) Otongo Mapalí, Santo Domingo de los Tsáchilas, Ecuador
- Occupation: Politician

Diana Alexandra Aguavil Calazacón (born 7 August 1983), is an Ecuadorian indigenous leader, since 25 August 2018, the first female governor of the Tsáchila nationality after 104 years of male administrations and winning the 2018 Tsáchila election. She was also the second woman to become a candidate.

In April 2019, the National Assembly awarded Diana Aguavil, social merit, for being the first woman governor of the Tsáchila nationality, she also received a Legislative Agreement in which it is recognised her work and unchanging disposition of service and delivery, depending on the collective interest. This activity was in the framework of the celebration of the traditional Kasama festival, which enhances the identity values of the Tsáchila nationality.
