= Panzaleo people =

The Panzaleo are a group of Quichua people in Ecuador, primarily in Cotopaxi and Tungurahua provinces. Up until the 17th century, they spoke their own Panzaleo language, but they later shifted to Kichwa.

Panzaleo pottery was originally thought to be associated with this group, but has since been identified as a type of trade pottery.
