= Esmeraldeño language =

Extinct language of Ecuador

Esmeraldeño
- Atacame, Takame
- Geografía y geología del Ecuador (1892), the book where the Esmeraldeño language is attested
- Native to: Ecuador
- Region: western Esmeraldas Province
- Ethnicity: Afro-Ecuadorians
- Era: attested 1877
- Language family: Language isolate

Language codes
- ISO 639-3: None (mis)
- Glottolog: atac1235
- Linguasphere: 81-JAA-aa

Esmeraldeño, or Esmeralda (also called Takame or Atacame), is an extinct language isolate formerly spoken in the coastal region of Ecuador, specifically in the western part of Esmeraldas Province.

== Geographical distribution ==
In the 19th century, the language was spoken along the lower Esmeraldas River in Esmeraldas Province. It may have previously extended across the Ecuadorian coast in the past.

== Classification ==
It has been proposed since 1902 that the language is connected to the still-spoken Pumé language of Venezuela. It also has some lexical similarities with the extinct Yurumanguí language.

== History ==
Around the beginning of the 19th century, William Bennet Stevenson visited the town of Esmeraldas, Ecuador, where he reported the Esmeraldeño language was in use; the town had a primarily Afro-Ecuadorian population. It is said that a group of shipwrecked African slaves encountered a group of local Indigenous people; they killed the men and settled among the women, from which their language was preserved. Stevenson also described the nearby town of Atacames as speaking Spanish. The descendant zambos were "factually" independent throughout the colonial period.

=== Documentation ===
The only data collected on the Esmeraldeño language were obtained by J. M. Pallares in 1877. These materials were published subsequently in Teodoro Wolf's (1892) Geografía y geología del Ecuador, and analyzed in Eduard Seler (1902), who first proposed a connection with Pumé, as well as Jacinto Jijón y Caamaño (1941), Adolfo Constenla Umaña (1991), and Willem Adelaar and Pieter Muysken (2004). It is one of only two languages (with Chaʼpalaachi) of the Ecuadorian coastal languages for which any significant data is known.

=== Language contact ===
Esmeraldeño has undergone extensive influence from two neighboring Barbacoan languages, Chaʼpalaa and Tsafiki. A genetic connection between Barbacoan and Esmeraldeño is considered unlikely, however, as otherwise the languages are very different. Shared vocabulary between the two are primarily flora and fauna, but also some basic vocabulary.

Esmeraldeño-Barbacoan shared vocabulary
gloss	Esmeraldeño	Cha'paa	Tsafiki
pineapple	chula	tʃiwíla	tʃiʎa
earth	dó	to	tu
cotton	kuve	kuwá	kuwa
bean	muripe	moló	mulu
Guadua	ta-páke	paʰkí	pahki
snake	piama	piní	pinʲe
rubber (Note: > Spanish: jebe)	sheve	sábe	sabe
chicken (Note: < Quechua: waʎpa)	walpa	wálpa	waʎapa

The obvious Quechua loanword walpa 'chicken' is a rarity; such words derived from Quechua are almost nonexistent.

== Phonology ==
=== Vowels ===
Esmeraldeño is thought to have a 5-vowel system /i, u, e, o, a/, although the large amount of variation between vowels is suggested by Jacinto Jijón y Caamaño to be indicative of a three-vowel system /i, u, a/ instead.

=== Consonants ===
Orthographical representations of the consonants are presented below; the exact phonetic interpretation of these is uncertain.

		Bilabial	Dental	Palatal	Velar	Glottal
Stop	voiceless	p	t		k	
Stop	voiced	b	d		g	
Affricate				ch		
Fricative	voiceless	f	s	sh	j~h	
Fricative	voiced	(v)				
Nasal		m	n			
Vibrant			r, rr			
Lateral			l	ll		
Approximant		w		y		

⟨j⟩ and ⟨h⟩ are thought to be in complementary distribution, with ⟨h⟩ rarely appearing word-initially, and ⟨j⟩ within a word. ⟨v⟩ sometimes alternates with ⟨b⟩.

== Morphology ==
In Esmeraldeño, genitives follow their head, adjectives both precede and follow their noun, and the language is both prefixing and suffixing. Personal reference is represented using suffixes, with -s(a) used for the first person and -va as the second person, as are cases. The former are used to indicate possessors on a noun, and the subject or object on a verb. -sa typically results in the dropping of a preceding vowel, except in monosyllabic roots; this may also occur with multisyllabic verb bases, and may also sometimes be stressed. A third-person possessor suffix is -e or -é.

mil-sá (Note: mil-e '(someone's) heart/stomach')
heart/stomach-1POSS
'my heart', 'my stomach'

mul-va
eye-2POSS
'your eye'

ene-sá
eat-1SBJ
'I eat'

peli-va
row-2SBJ
'You are rowing'

pisko-vá-s
sell-2SBJ-1OBJ
'Sell it to me!'
