= William Bennet Stevenson =

British writer on South America

William Bennet Stevenson (c. 1787 – after 1830) was a British explorer. He lived for many years in South America during the time of the Spanish American wars of independence, and wrote a book about his experiences and observations.

== South America ==
Stevenson is thought to have been born about 1787, but nothing is known of his early life.

About 1803 he landed on the coast of Chile in the district of Araucanía, which at that time was inhabited only by indigenous people; his intention was to travel through the country. On proceeding to Arauco he was detained a prisoner on the pretext that war had broken out between Spain and England. He was conveyed successively to Concepción, Callao, and Lima, where he was imprisoned for eight months. His liberty was gradually extended, and he was permitted to reside in the town and to make excursions into the adjoining provinces.

In 1808 Stevenson became private secretary to Manuel Ruiz Urriés de Castilla, president and captain-general of Quito, where, on the outbreak of the Ecuadorian War of Independence, he joined the insurgents. In December 1810 he was appointed governor of Esmeraldas with the title of lieutenant-colonel. In 1818 Lord Cochrane came to South America and, becoming a Chilean citizen, took command of the Chilean navy in the Chilean War of Independence. Stevenson became his secretary and took part in many of his naval operations.

After twenty years' residence in South America, Stevenson revisited England about 1824.

== Publication ==
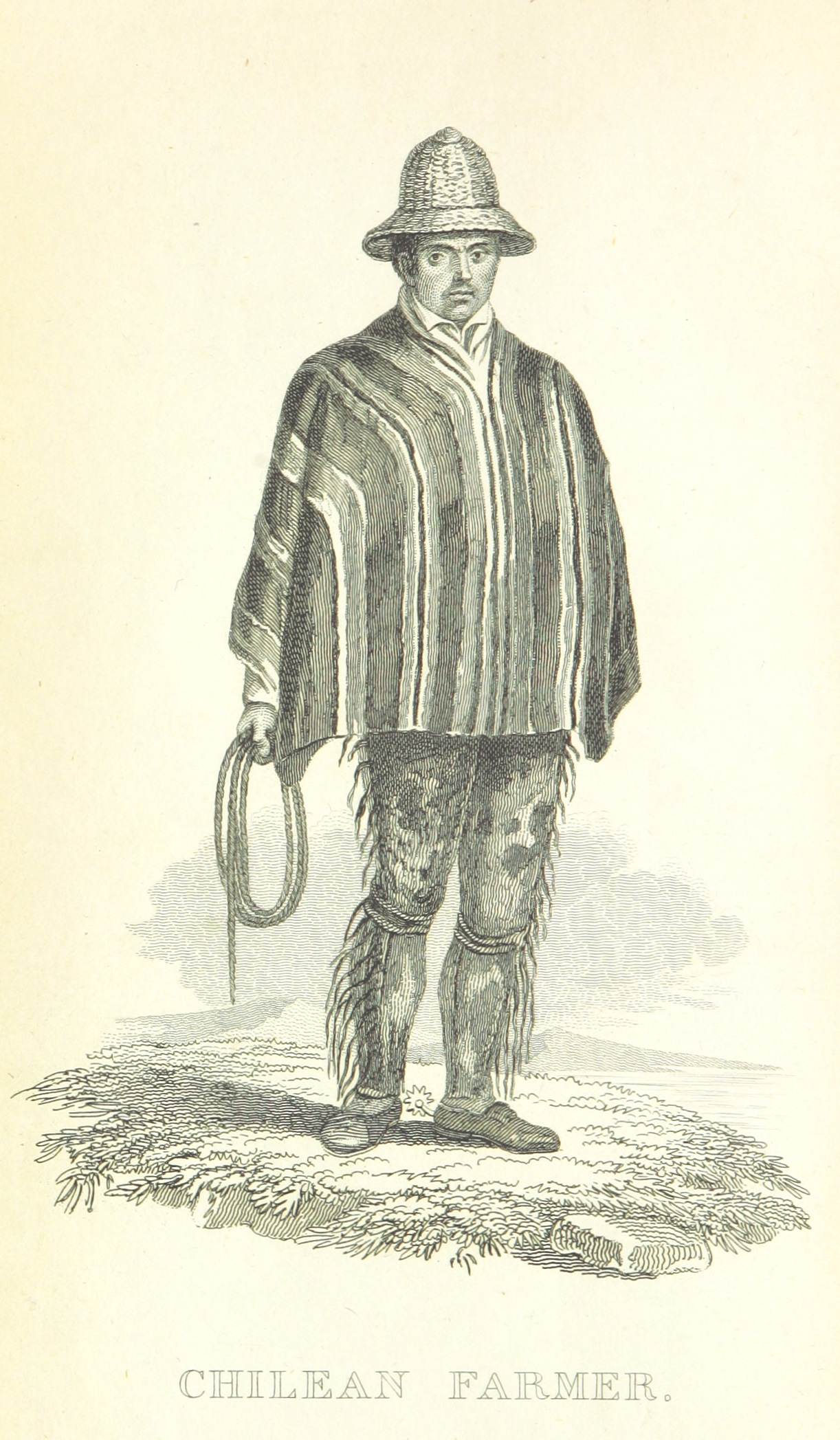
A Chilean farmer: an illustration from Stevenson's book

While in England he published the results of his American experiences in a work entitled A Historical and Descriptive Narrative of Twenty Years' Residence in South America (London 1825). The book is of great value for the period of the Spanish American wars of independence, and he used his unique opportunities for observation to advantage. William H. Prescott made much use of the book in his History of the Conquest of Peru. Translations into French and German were published at Paris and Weimar respectively in 1826.

He returned to Peru about the end of 1825.

In 1827 Stevenson went to Greece where he started a potato plantation; he abandoned the enterprise the following year because of ill health. He is thought to have been alive in 1830, but the date and place of his death are not known.
