= Iscuandé River =

River in Colombia

- Location of mouth

Location
- Country: Colombia

Physical characteristics
- Mouth
  - coordinates: 2°37′12″N 78°03′57″W

The Iscuandé River is a river of Colombia. It drains into the Pacific Ocean.

== See also ==
- List of rivers of Colombia
