= Cañari–Puruhá languages =

Extinct language pair of Ecuador

Cañari–Puruhá
- Geographic distribution: Ecuadoran Andes
- Extinct: late 17th century
- Linguistic classification: Barbacoan?: Cañari–Puruhá
- Subdivisions: Cañari; Puruhá

Language codes
- Linguasphere: 84-AAA
- Glottolog: None

Cañari (Cañar, Kanyari) and Puruhá (Puruguay, Puruwá) are two poorly-attested extinct languages of the Marañón River basin in Ecuador that are difficult to classify. Puruhá is scarcely attested, and Cañari is known primarily from placenames. Loukotka (1968) suggests they may have been related to Mochica (Yunga) in a family called Chimuan, followed by Kaufman (1994), but Adelaar (2004:397) thinks it is more likely that they were Barbacoan languages. (See extinct languages of the Marañón River basin.)

== Varieties ==
Cañari and Puruhá are the two main varieties:

- Cañari - extinct language of Cañar Province, Ecuador
- Puruhá / Puruguai - extinct language once spoken in Chimborazo Province and Bolívar Province, Ecuador
