= Tsáchila =

Indigenous people in Ecuador

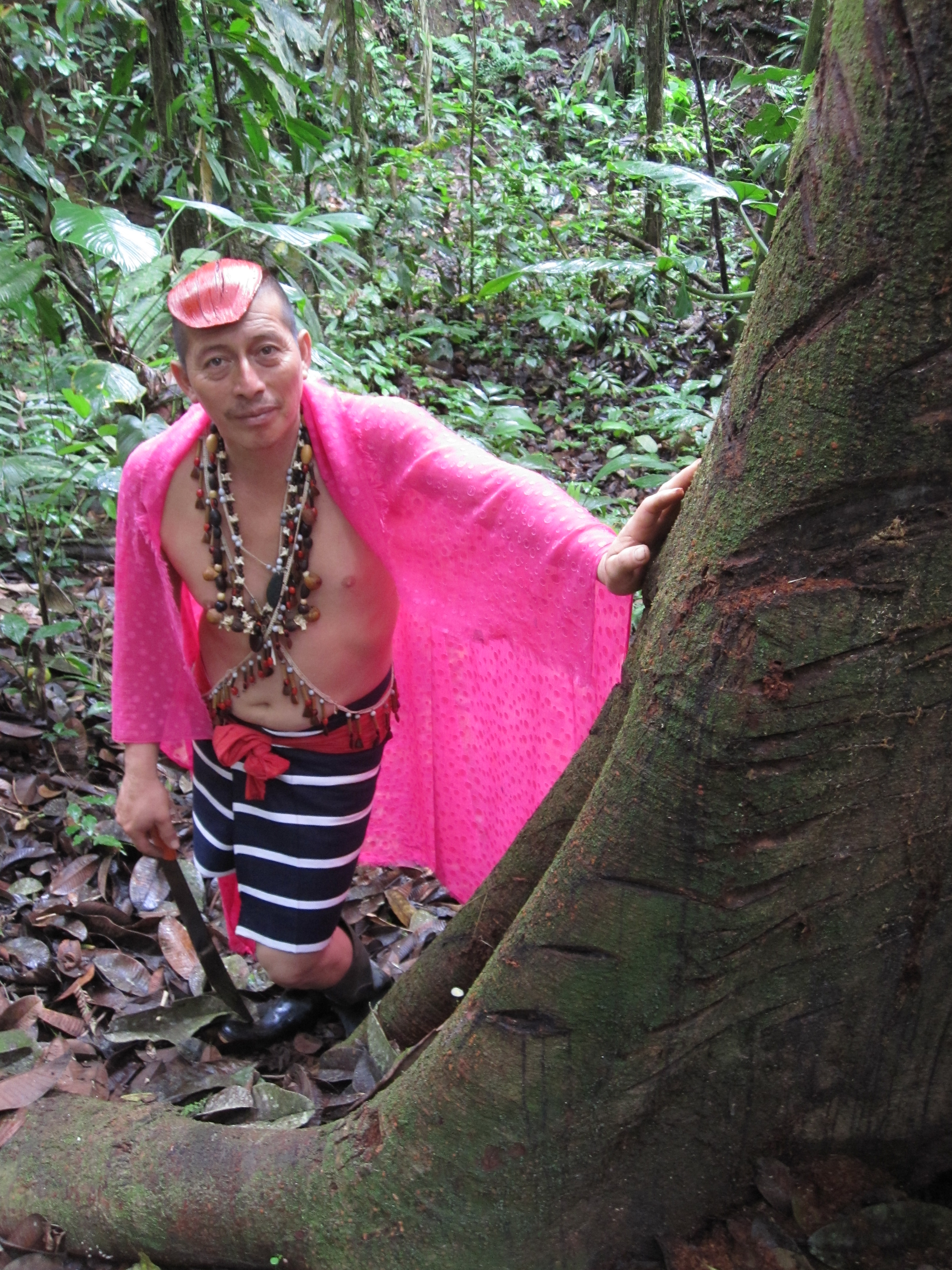
Tsáchila man guiding a forest walk near Santo Domingo de Los Colorados

The Tsachila, also called the Colorados (meaning “the colored ones”), are an indigenous people of the Ecuadorian province of Santo Domingo de los Tsáchilas, partly named after them. Their native language is Tsafiki, a member of the Barbacoan linguistic family, and translates to mean "true word".

== Population ==
According to the 1997 census, their population had reached 2,640 inhabitants. These are grouped into eight communities: Cóngoma Grante (St. John), Los Naranjos, El Búho de los Colorados, El Poste, Peripa, Chigüpe, Otongo Mapalí, and Filomena Aguavil (Tahuaza). These communities are located in the rural canton of Santo Domingo de los Tsachilas.

== Geography ==
The Tsachila people are located near the base of the Andes Mountains. The province has a surface area of 3,857 km², an altitude of 625 m, and is located 120 km from the Pacific Ocean. The province shares a border to the north and east with Pichincha, to the west with Manabí, to the south with Los Ríos, and the southeast with Cotopaxi. Ecuador’s northwestern zone is the zone that receives the most rainfall in the country. It has a great hydrological wealth where five important basins and micro-basins are located: The east and northeast, the middle and lower course of Toachi, belongs to the White River basin; to the south, the sub-basin of Borbón which belongs to the Guayas river great basin, and is joined with the Babis (Nino Torres). In the southeast, the Peripa river sub-basin; to the northeast. The sub-basin of Quinindé, along with the White River sub-basin; the northeast belongs to the Esmeralda River basin. The city is located at the end of the Toachi river basin which is located to the east side of the city. Bombolí hill is the highest elevation.

== Legend of the origin of their ornamentation ==
Men of this ethnic group are easily distinguishable for an elaborate head decoration that they style by shaving the temporal areas of their heads and shaping the remaining hair into a helmet-like feature with a mixture of grease and annatto sap/seeds which is achiote. This tradition is believed to have been a palliative measure from a time when the Tsachila's were exposed to the ravages of smallpox. A Tsáchila shaman asked a spirit to guide them to a cure by ceremony and prayer. They were guided to an achiote bush. They covered themselves completely with the red juices of the seed-pods and after a few days the mortality in the group was drastically reduced. They are forever grateful to this plant for the protection that it offered to the entire community from smallpox. The shape of their hair style is fashioned to look like the seed pods.

== Present day way of life ==
They speak the Tsafiki or Tsáchila language of the Barbacoan language family. Men wear horizontally striped cobalt blue/black and white skirts, and the women wear brightly colored horizontally striped skirts.

The Spaniards called them "Colorado" (meaning colored red) because they used to cover their entire bodies in the red juices of the achiote seeds, for protection against smallpox, but the Spaniards thought red was indeed their true skin color.

== Notable people ==
- Diana Aguavil (born 1983) became the first female governor of the Tsáchila people in 2018.
- Amy Gende (born 1998) represented Province of Santo Domingo de los Tsáchilas at the National Assembly from 2023 to 2025.
- In 2024 Jadira Bayas was recognised for her work supporting local culture when she was given Tsáchila nationality.

== Historical notes ==
The largest city of the canton is Santo Domingo de los Colorados and was named after these ethnic groups. Most Ecuadorians consider the shamans of the Tsachila's holders of secrets of the rain forest and of healing powers that would heal whenever the western medicine had failed. For the most part, this country legend was generated by the fame of Abraham Calazacom a tribal chief of the Tsachila's that led his tribe in the fifties and sixties. Their economic activity is limited to harvesting of native tropical products for traditional medicine, especially the Tagua or Corozo nuts that are used to manufacture hand-crafts in many communities of Ecuador. They also cultivate tropical fruits, including different varieties of the genus Musa (bananas), Pineapples, Papayas, Oranges, etc, as well as farming Cocoa plants.
