= Guambiano language =

Indigenous language of Colombia

Guambiano
- Misak, Moguex
- Namtrik
- Native to: Colombia
- Region: Cauca Department
- Ethnicity: c. 20,780 Guambiano
- Native speakers: 21,000 (2008)
- Language family: Barbacoan: Northern; Coconucan; Guambiano

Language codes
- ISO 639-3: gum
- Glottolog: guam1248
- ELP: Guambiano
- Linguasphere: 81-GAA-c
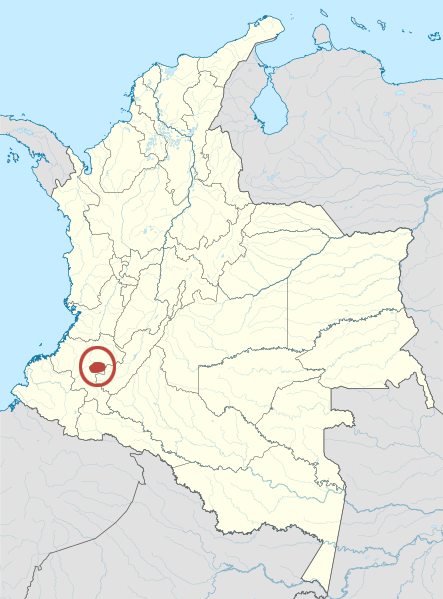
- Map of the Guambiano language in Colombia

- Guambiano is classified as Definitely Endangered by the UNESCO Atlas of the World's Languages in Danger

Guambiano, also called Misak, Namuy Wam, Nam Trik or Moguex is a Barbacoan language spoken in southwestern Colombia, in Cauca Department by the Guambianos, whose population is estimated at 20 782 people.

== Classification ==
Guambiano, along with Totoró and the long-extinct Coconuco language, form a distinct subgroup of the Barbacoan languages. Often, these languages are considered dialects of one Coconucan language.

Within the Barbacoan family, the Coconucan languages and Awa Pit constitute the northern branch of it.

== Phonology ==
The Guambiano inventory is as follows (Curnow & Liddicoat 1998:386).

Vowels
	Front	Central	Back
Close	i		u
Mid	e	ə	
Back		a	

Consonants
	Bilabial	Dental	Retroflex	Palatal	Velar
Nasal	m	n		ɲ	
Plosive	p	t			k
Affricate		ts	tʂ	tʃ	
Fricative		s	ʂ	ʃ	
Liquid		r, l		ʎ	
Semivowel	w			j	

== Vocabulary ==
English	Spanish	Guambiano
One	Uno	Kan
Two	Dos	Pa
Three	Tres	Pyn
Dog	Perro	Wera
Man	Hombre	Myk
Moon	Luna	Pyl
Stone	Piedra	Xuk
Sun	Sol	Pych
Water	Agua	Pi
Woman	Mujer	Ixuk

== Sample text ==
Below is the Lord's Prayer translated into Guambiano.

Ñimpe Tiuspa waminchip pɵntrappe, ɵyah chintrikai: Namui Mɵskai srɵmpalasrɵ wapik, ñui munchipe tapikweintɵ tarɵmara, newan tap intik kɵntrun. Ñi aship karup pasraipe pirau latrɵpitchap amɵ, srɵmpalasrɵ latawei yu piraukucha, Ñi maik maramtiik kɵpen, treekwei marik kɵntrai. Kualɵmmɵrik nam mamik maik palapikwan mɵi tranɵp, namui kaik mariilan ulɵ paimɵ, pesannatruntrik chip, nam namun kaik marɵpelan ulɵ paimɵ, pesannawa kɵtrɵmisrɵp lataitɵwei. Chikѳpen namun kekɵtrɵsrkɵntraptiik pɵntrɵpene, truwane namun ampashmɵtruntrik. Masken tru kaikweinukkutrimpe tarɵmartra. Kakente, tru aship karup waipa, marampurap mariipa, purɵ nuik, purɵ tapiipape manakatik Ñuin kɵn chip.

== Bibliography ==
- Curnow, Timothy Jowan; Liddicoat, Anthony J. (1998). "The Barbacoan Languages of Colombia and Ecuador". Anthropological Linguistics. 40 (3): 384–408. ISSN 0003-5483. JSTOR 30028647.
