= Andaqui language =

Extinct language of Colombia

Andaquí
- Jirara
- Native to: Colombia
- Region: southern highlands
- Ethnicity: 248 Andaquí people (2018 census)
- Extinct: by 1970s?
- Language family: Language isolate

Language codes
- ISO 639-3: ana
- Glottolog: anda1286
- Linguasphere: 81-GBB-aa

Andaquí (or Andakí) is an extinct language from the southern highlands of Colombia. It was spoken by the Andaquí people of Colombia. Whether or not the language is extinct is uncertain. Its only documentation comes from two lengthy wordlists.

== Documentation ==
There are two main sources of information about Andaquí. The first is a list sent to Madrid by Mutis, about twenty pages long, that contains words and expressions in the language that was published in the catalogue of the Royal Library in 1928. A second list was collected by Manuel María Albis in 1854.

== Classification ==
Jolkesky (2016) notes that there are lexical similarities with Páez, Chibcha (also proposed by Rivet 1924), and Tinigua-Pamigua due to contact.

Páez and Andaquí have a significant amount of common culture-specific vocabulary, which suggests some amount of borrowing. Several similar words between the two languages are also part of the core lexis. However, the general aspects of words in Andaquí differ greatly from those of Páez. Andaquí words tend be long and have open syllables.

=== Lexical comparison ===
Páez and Andaquí have a significant amount of lexical parallels. Marcelo Jolkesky found that the similar vocabularies of Andaquí and Páez indicated that the two groups had maintained close contact with each other during the pre-Columbian era.

English	Andaquí	Páez
cotton	kʷakʷa-	wawa
tapir	kũtihui	kʰũʦʲ
sand	mĩsara	muse
potato	kaka	kaʔka "papa"
pumpkin/vessel	kʷatiː	tʰeː
hair	kiaha "cabelo"	dʲkʰas ‘pelo’
chicha	baku-hi, baku-sa	beka
Crax (bird)	ɸitiː fitihi "paujil"	fiⁿdʒ "pava"
two	nãsiːsi	eʔns
child	ʧikʷa-	n-ʧiʔk
fire	iɸi "llama"	ipʲ
man	miʦiː; biʦi-ka ‘sou homem’	pihʦ
brother	piː	peβʲ "hermano menor"
language	gua sunai	tʰune
mazamorra	kaihi	kʰaʃ
corn	kiɸi	ʃipʲ "cooked cob"
eye	siɸi	jaɸʲ
to hear/ear	sũkʷa-i, sũkʷa-hu; sũkʷa "oír"	tʰũʔwã ‘oreja’
stone	kʷatii	kʷet
tail	maʦĩkwa, maisikwa	menz
face	ʧipina	dʲiʔp
sow	hu-	uhua-
breast	ʦuʦuka	ʦʲuʔʦʲ

He also outlined some parallels between Andaquí and Tinigua:

English	Andaquí	Tinigua
pumpkin	batii, kʷa-tizi	tisi-kʰi, tisi-ʧi
firewood/tree	hizi "firewood"	kixi "tree"
to eat	ʧija	ʤiʔo
wife	nusũkʷa	nɨʧo
man	miʦii; biʦika	piksiɡa
jaguar	mihinai	hiɲa
deer	sũtai, sondai	xunze
I	rĩka	hikʷa
you	ka-, ði-	kaʔzɨ-
he/she	riːsi	hiʔki
we	rĩɡʷakʷa	hikʷaʔa
you (plural)	rikakʷa	kaʔkʷaʔa

== Phonology ==
The available sources of information for Andaquí use 30 distinct graphemes between consonant and vowel symbols. Mutis's vocabulary list contains several unusual combinations of letters whose phonetic value can only be conjectured. The one that appears with most frequency is fsrr- as in fsrragua (a type of liana) and fsrrixa ("agave fiber"). The sequences fs, sz, sh also were used, but by the 19th century they were generally replaced by s. Thus, it could be interpreted that in the 150 years between the sources, phonemes like /ʃ/, /ʂ/ and /ʈʂ/ disappeared from Andaquí speech.

According to an analysis by Gabriela Coronas Urzía, the existing graphemes are interpreted as 12 consonant phonemes, 3 oral vowels (/i a u/), and 3 nasal vowels (/ĩ ã ũ/).

Three diacritics were also used: the grave (à), the acute (á), and the circumflex (â). The grave and acute accents probably represented a fixed stress on the final syllable, which was not phonemic due to its predictable nature. The circumflex likely represented nasalization.

== Grammar ==
Andaquí was likely an agglutinative language given the large amount of long words. It used both prefixes and suffixes.

The subject was marked on the verb using prefixes. For example, the prefix ka- marked the second person.

ninga ka-mimi
1SG 2SG.SUBJ-love
Do you love me?

Nominalization, grammatical mood, and some parts of person reference were marked using suffixes. For instance, the suffix for the imperative in the second person was -zá:

fsrrajono-zá
go_to_bed-2SG.IMP
Go to bed!

Case was also indicated by suffixes:

cogo "house" / cogora "(go to a) house"

== See also ==
- Macro-Paesan languages
