= Coconuco language =

Barbacoan language spoken in Colombia

Coconuco
- Nam Trik
- Native to: Colombia
- Region: Cauca Department
- Ethnicity: Guambiano, Totoró
- Native speakers: 21,000 (2008)
- Language family: Barbacoan: Coconuco
- Dialects: Coconuco proper †; Totoro; Guambiano (Moguex)

Language codes
- ISO 639-3: Either: gum – Guambiano ttk – Totoró
- Glottolog: coco1262
- Linguasphere: 81-GAA

Coconuco is a dialect cluster of Colombia spoken by the Guambiano indigenous people. Though the three varieties, Guambiano, Totoró, and the long-extinct Coconuco are traditionally called languages, Adelaar & Muysken (2004) believe that they are best treated as a single language.

Totoró had 76 speakers in 2019 out of an ethnic population of 4,000 in 1998. Guambiano, on the other hand, is vibrant and growing.

Coconucan was for a time mistakenly included in a spurious Paezan language family, due to a purported "Moguex" (Guambiano) vocabulary that turned out to be a mix of Páez and Guambiano (Curnow 1998).
