= Panzaleo language =

Language of Ecuador

Panzaleo
- Latacunga
- Native to: Ecuador
- Region: Quito
- Ethnicity: Panzaleo people
- Extinct: 17th century
- Language family: unclassified (Paezan?)

Language codes
- ISO 639-3: None (mis)
- Glottolog: panz1235
- Linguasphere: 81-GBA-ba

Panzaleo (Pansaleo, Quito, Latacunga) is a poorly attested and unclassified indigenous American language that was spoken in the region of Quito until the 17th century.

== Attestation ==
Much of the information on Panzaleo comes from toponyms of central and northern Ecuador. Typical are:

-(h)aló: Pilaló, Mulahaló
-leo: Tisaleo, Pelileo
-lagua / -ragua: Cutuglagua, Tungurahua

== Classification ==
Loukotka (1968) suggested that Panzaleo might be related to Paez. One of his sources for this proposal was Jijón y Caamaño (1940), who admit that the evidence is weak and may have been due to language contact.

== Sources ==
- Jijón y Caamaño, Jacinto (1936–8): Sebastián de Benalcázar, vol. 1 (1936) Quito: Imprenta del Clero; vol. 2 (1938) Quito: Editorial Ecuatoriana.
- Jijón y Caamaño, Jacinto (1940–5): El Ecuador interandino y occidental antes de la conquista castellana, vol. 1 (1940), vol. 2 (1941), vol. 3 (1943), vol. 4 (1945). Quito: Editorial Ecuatoriana (1998 edition, Quito: Abya-Yala).
- Jiménez de la Espada, Marcos, ed. (1965 [1586]): Relaciones geográficas de Indias: Perú, 3 vols. Biblioteca de Autores Españoles 183–5. Madrid: Atlas.
