= Puruhá language =

Extinct language

Puruhá
- Puruguay
- Native to: Ecuador
- Region: Chimborazo Province
- Ethnicity: Puruhá
- Extinct: c. late 17th century
- Language family: Barbacoan ?: Cañari–Puruhá; Puruhá

Language codes
- ISO 639-3: None (mis)
- Glottolog: puru1267
- Linguasphere: 84-AAA-aa

Puruhá (Puruguay, Puruwá) is a poorly attested extinct language of the Marañón River basin in Ecuador which is difficult to classify, apart from being apparently related to Cañari, though it may have been Barbacoan. A grammar was reportedly written in the late 17th century; it appears to have been lost.

== Proper names ==
Family names frequently end in -cela or -lema, sich as Duchicela, the family of Atahualpa's mother Paccha Duchicela, and Daquilema, the surname of 19th-century rebel Fernando Daquilema. Endings of place names include -shi (e.g. Pilligshi), -tus (e.g. Guasuntús), and -bug (e.g. Tulubug). Some complex endings are -cahuan, -calpi, -tactu, which can occur with Quechua roots, as in Supaycahuan (Quechua supay 'devil').

== See also ==
- Cañari–Puruhá languages
