= Chaʼpalaa language =

Barbacoan language of Ecuador

Chaʼpalaa
- Cayapa, Chachi
- Chaʼpalaa
- Region: Ecuador
- Native speakers: 5,870 (2012)
- Language family: Barbacoan: Southern?; Chaʼpalaa

Language codes
- ISO 639-3: cbi
- Glottolog: chac1249
- ELP: Cha'palaa
- Linguasphere: 81-HBA-aa

Chaʼpalaa (also known as Chachi or Cayapa) is a Barbacoan language spoken in northern Ecuador by around 5,870 Chachi people.

== Name ==
"Chaʼpalaa" means "language of the Chachi people."

== Documentation ==
This language was described in part by the missionary P. Alberto Vittadello, who, by the time his description was published in Guayaquil, Ecuador in 1988, had lived for seven years among the tribe.

== Phonology ==
=== Vowels ===
Cha'palaa has four vowels: /a, e, i, u/.

=== Consonants ===
Cha'palaa has 23 consonant phonemes.

Consonants
		Labial	Alveolar	Palatal	Dorsal	Glottal
Nasal		m	n	ɲ		
Stop	voiceless	p	t	tʲ	k	ʔ
Stop	voiced	b	d	dʲ	g	ʔ
Affricate			t͡s	t͡ʃ		
Fricative		f	s	ʃ	χ	
Glide			l	j	w	
Liquid			ɾ	ʎ		

== Writing system ==
Chaʼpalaa is written using the Latin alphabet, making use of the following graphemes:

A, B, C, CH, D, DY, E, F, G, GU, HU, I, J, L, LL, M, N, Ñ, P, QU, R, S, SH, T, TS, TY, U, V, Y, and ʼ.

The writing system includes four simple vowels, and four double vowels:

== Morphology ==
Chaʼpalaa has agglutinative morphology, with a Subject-Object-Verb word order.
