= Barbacoan languages =

Language family spoken in Colombia and Ecuador

Barbacoan
- Geographic distribution: Colombia and Ecuador
- Linguistic classification: One of the world's primary language families
- Proto-language: Proto-Barbacoan
- Subdivisions: Awan; Coconucan; Cayapa–Tsafiki; ? Cañari–Puruhá †

Language codes
- Glottolog: barb1265
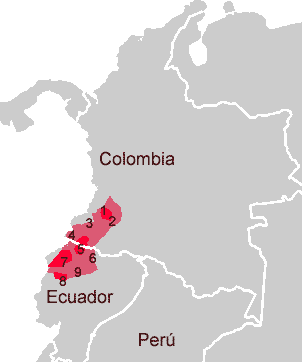
- Barbacoan language at present, and probable areas in the 16th century: 1 Guambiano 2 Totoró (†) 3 Barbacoa (†) 4 Sindagua (†?) 5 Awá Pit 6 Pasto-Muellamués (†?) 7 Cha'palaachi 8 Tsáfiki 9 Caranqui (†?)

Barbacoan (also Barbakóan, Barbacoano, Barbacoana) is a language family spoken in Colombia and Ecuador.

== Genealogical relations ==
The Barbacoan languages may be related to the Páez language. Barbacoan is often connected with the Paezan languages (including Páez); however, Curnow (1998) shows how much of this proposal is based on misinterpretation of an old document of Douay (1888). (See: Paezan languages.)

Other more speculative larger groupings involving Barbacoan include the Macro-Paesan "cluster", the Macro-Chibchan stock, and the Chibchan-Paezan stock.

== Language contact ==
Jolkesky (2016) notes that there are lexical similarities with the Atakame, Cholon-Hibito, Kechua, Mochika, Paez, Tukano, Umbra, and Chibchan (especially between Guaymí and Southern Barbacoan branches) language families due to contact.

== Languages ==
- Barbacoan
  - Northern
    - Awan (also known as Awa or Pasto)
      - Awa Pit (also known as Cuaiquer, Coaiquer, Kwaiker, Awá, Awa, Telembi, Sindagua, Awa-Cuaiquer, Koaiker, Telembí)
      - Pasto–Muellamués
        - †Pasto (also known as Past Awá)
        - †Muellamués (also known as Muellamués, Muelyama)
    - Coconucan (also known as Guambiano–Totoró)
      - Guambiano (also known as Mogües, Moguez, Mogés, Wam, Misak, Guambiano-Moguez, Wambiano-Mogés, Moguex)
      - (†)Totoró (also known as Polindara)
      - †Coconuco (also known as Kokonuko, Cauca, Wanaka)
  - Southern ? (Cayapa–Tsafiki)
    - †Caranqui (also known as Cara, Kara, Karanki, Imbaya)
    - Cha’palaa (also known as Cayapa, Chachi, Kayapa, Nigua, Cha’palaachi)
    - Tsafiki (also known as Colorado, Tsafiqui, Tsáfiki, Tsáchela, Tsachila, Campaz, Colima)
  - Cañari-Puruhá ?
    - †Cañari
    - †Puruhá

Pasto, Muellamués, Coconuco, Totoró and Caranqui are now extinct.

Pasto and Muellamués are usually classified as Barbacoan, but the current evidence is weak and deserves further attention. Muellamués may have been one of the last surviving dialects of Pasto (both extinct, replaced by Spanish) — Muellamués is known only by a short wordlist recorded in the 19th century. The Muellamués vocabulary is similar to modern Awa Pit. The Cañari–Puruhá languages are even more poorly attested, and while often placed in a Chimuan family, Adelaar (2004:397) thinks they may have been Barbacoan.

The Coconucan languages were first connected to Barbacoan by Daniel Brinton in 1891. However, a subsequent publication by Henri Beuchat and Paul Rivet placed Coconucan together with a Paezan family (which included Páez and Paniquita) due a misleading "Moguex" vocabulary list. The "Moguex" vocabulary turned out to be a mix of both Páez and Guambiano languages (Curnow 1998). This vocabulary has led to misclassifications by Greenberg (1956, 1987), Loukotka (1968), Kaufman (1990, 1994), and Campbell (1997), among others. Although Páez may be related to the Barbacoan family, a conservative view considers Páez a language isolate pending further investigation. Guambiano is more similar to other Barbacoan languages than to Páez, and thus Key (1979), Curnow et al. (1998), Gordon (2005), and Campbell (2012) place Coconucan under Barbacoan. The extinct Totoró is sometimes considered a dialect of Guambiano instead of a separate language, and, indeed, Adelaar & Muysken (2004) state that Guambiano-Totoró-Coconuco is best treated as a single language.

The Barbácoa (Barbacoas) language itself is unattested, and is only assumed to be part of the Barbacoan family. Nonetheless, it has been assigned an ISO code, though the better-attested and classifiable Pasto language has not.

The Otavalo people, before adopting a Kichwa dialect sometime in the 16th century, may have spoken a Barbacoan language.

=== Loukotka (1968) ===
Below is a full list of Barbacoan language varieties listed by Loukotka (1968), including names of unattested varieties.

- Barbacoa group
  - Barbácoa (of Colima) - extinct language once spoken on the Iscuandé River and Patia River, Nariño department, Colombia. (Unattested.)
  - Pius - extinct language once spoken around the Laguna Piusbi, in the Nariño region. (Unattested.)
  - Iscuandé - extinct language once spoken on the Iscuandé River in the Nariño region. (Unattested.)
  - Tumaco - extinct language once spoken around the modern city of Tumaco, department of Nariño. (Unattested.)
  - Guapi - extinct language once spoken on the Guapi River, department of Cauca. (Unattested.)
  - Cuaiquer / Koaiker - spoken on the Cuaiquer River in Colombia.
  - Telembi - extinct language once spoken in the Cauca region on the Telembi River. (Andre 1884, pp. 791–799.)
  - Panga - extinct language once spoken near the modern city of Sotomayor, Nariño department. (Unattested.)
  - Nulpe - extinct language once spoken in the Nariño region on the Nulpe River. (Unattested.)
  - Cayápa / Nigua - language spoken now by a few families on the Cayapas River, Esmeraldas province, Ecuador.
  - Malaba - extinct language once spoken in Esmeraldas province on the Mataje River. (Unattested.)
  - Yumbo - extinct language once spoken in the Cordillera de Intag and the Cordillera de Nanegal, Pichincha province, Ecuador. The population now speaks only Quechua. (Unattested.)
  - Colima - extinct language once spoken on the middle course of the Daule River, Guayas province. (Unattested.)
  - Colorado / Tsachela / Chono / Campaz / Satxíla / Colime - language still spoken on the Daule River, Vinces River, and Esmeraldas River, provinces of Santo Domingo de los Tsáchilas and Los Ríos, Ecuador.
  - Caranqui / Cara / Imbaya - extinct language once spoken in the province of Imbabura and on the Guayllabamba River, Ecuador. The population now speaks Spanish or Quechua.
  - Sindagua / Malla - extinct language once spoken on the Tapaje River, Iscuandé River, Mamaonde River, and Patia River, department of Nariño, Colombia. (H. Lehmann 1949; Ortiz 1938, pp. 543–545, each only a few patronyms and toponyms.)
  - Muellama - extinct language of the Nariño region, once spoken in the village of Muellamués.
  - Pasta - extinct language once spoken in Carchi province, Ecuador, and in the department of Nariño in Colombia around the modern city of Pasto, Colombia.
  - Quijo - once spoken on the Napo River and Coca River, Oriente province, Ecuador. The tribe now speaks only Quechua. (Ordónez de Ceballos 1614, f. 141–142, only three words.)
  - Mastele - extinct language once spoken on the left bank of the Guaitara River near the mouth, department of Nariño. (Unattested.)
  - Mayasquer - extinct language once spoken in the villages of Mayasquer and Pindical, Carchi province, Ecuador. The present population speaks only Quechua. (Unattested.)
- Coconuco group
  - Coconuco - language spoken by a few families at the sources of the Cauca River, department of Cauca, Colombia.
  - Guanuco / Guamíca - extinct language once spoken in the village of Plata Vieja in Colombia.
  - Guambiana / Silviano - spoken in the villages of Ambató, Cucha and partly in Silvia.
  - Totaró - extinct language once spoken in the villages of Totoró and Polindara.
  - Tunía - once spoken on the Tunía River and Ovejas River. (Unattested.)
  - Chesquio - extinct language once spoken on the Sucio River. (Unattested.)
  - Patia - once spoken between the Timbío River and Guachicono River. (Unattested.)
  - Quilla - original and extinct language of the villages of Almaguer, Santiago, and Milagros. The present population speaks only a dialect of Quechua. (Unattested.)
  - Timbío - once spoken on the Timbío River. (Unattested.)
  - Puracé - once spoken around the Laguna de las Papas and Puracé Volcano. (Unattested.)
  - Puben / Pubenano / Popayan - extinct language of the plains of Popayán, department of Cauca. (Unattested.)
  - Moguex - spoken in the village of Quisgó and in a part of the village of Silvia.

== Proto-language ==
Proto-Barbacoan
- Reconstruction of: Barbacoan languages

Proto-Barbacoan reconstructions and reflexes (Curnow & Liddicoat 1998):

no.	gloss	Proto-Barbacoan	Guambiano	Totoró	Awapit	Cha’palaachi	Tsafiqui
1	be	*i-			i-	i-	
2	blow	*ut-	utʂ-	otʂ-	us-		
3	come	*ha-			a-	ha-	ha-
4	cook	*aj-			aj-	(a-)	aj-
5	corn	*pijo			pija		pijo
6	do	*ki-			ki-	ki-	ki-
7	dry	*pur	pur		pul		
8	eye	*kap	kap	kap-[tʂul]	(kasu)	ka-[puka]	ka-[’ka]
9	feces	*pi			pɨ	pe	pe
10	firewood	*tɨ		tʂɨ	sɨ	te	te
11	flower	*uʃ	u	o	uʃ		
12	fog	*waniʃ	waɲi	wapi	waniʃ		
13	get up	*kus-			ku̥s-	kuh-	(ku’pa-)
14	go	*hi-	i-			hi-	hi-
15	go up	*lo-			nu-	lu-	lo-
16	hair	*aʃ			aʃ		a
17	house	*ja	ja	ja	(jal)	ja	ja
18	I	*la	na	na	na		la
19	land	*to			su	tu	to
20	lie down	*tso	tsu	tsu	tu	tsu	tso
21	listen	*miina-			mina-	meena-	
22	louse	*mũũ	(mũi)		muuŋ	mu	mu
23	mouth	*ɸit			pit	fiʔ-[paki]	ɸi-[’ki]
24	no/negative	*ti			ʃi		ti
25	nose	*kim-ɸu	kim	kim	kimpu̥		kinɸu
26	path	*mii			mii	mi-[ɲu]	mi-[nu]
27	river, water	*pii	pi	pi	pii	pi	pi
28	rock	*ʃuk	ʂuk	ʂuk	uk	ʃu-[puka]	su
29	smoke	*iʃ	iʃ		iʃ		
30	sow	*wah-			waa-	wah-	wa’-[ke-]
31	split	*paa-			paa-	paa-	
32	tear ("eye-water")	*kap pi	kappi		kappi	kapi	ka’pĩ
33	that	*sun			sun	hun	hun
34	thorn	*po	pu		pu	pu	po
35	tree, stick	*tsik	tsik			tʃi	tsi-[de]
36	two	*paa	pa	pa	(paas)	paa	(palu)
37	what?	*ti	tʃi	(tʃini)	ʃi	ti-[n]	ti
38	who?	*mo	mu			mu-[n]	mo
39	wipe clean	*kis-			ki̥s-	kih-	
40	yellow	*lah-			na-[tam]	lah-[katata]	(la’ke)
41	you (sg.)	*nu	(ɲi)	(ɲi)	nu	ɲu	nu
42	armadillo	*ʃul ?	ʂulə	ʂolɨ	ulam		
43	dirt	*pil ?	pirə	pirɨ	pil		
44	moon	*pɨ ?	pəl	pɨl			pe
45	suck	*tsu- ?			tuk-		tsu-
46	tail	*mɨ ?	məʃ, mətʂ	mɨʂ	mɨta		me
47	three	*pɨ ?	pən	pɨn		pema	pemã
48	tooth	*tu ?	tʂukul	tʂokol	sula		

== See also ==
- Paezan languages
- Páez language

== Bibliography ==
- Adelaar, Willem F. H.; & Muysken, Pieter C. (2004). The languages of the Andes. Cambridge language surveys. Cambridge University Press.
- Brend, Ruth M. (Ed.). (1985). From phonology to discourse: Studies in six Colombian languages (p. vi, 133). Language Data, Amerindian Series (No. 9). Dallas: Summer Institute of Linguistics.
- Beuchat, Henri; & Rivet, Paul. (1910). Affinités des langues du sud de la Colombie et du nord de l'Équateur. Le Mouséon, 11, 33-68, 141-198.
- Campbell, Lyle. (1997). American Indian languages: The historical linguistics of Native America. New York: Oxford University Press. ISBN 0-19-509427-1.
- Constenla Umaña, Adolfo. (1981). Comparative Chibchan phonology. (Doctoral dissertation, University of Pennsylvania).
- Constenla Umaña, Adolfo. (1991). Las lenguas del área intermedia: Introducción a su estudio areal. San José: Editorial de la Universidad de Costa Rica.
- Constenla Umaña, Adolfo. (1993). La familia chibcha. In (M. L. Rodríguez de Montes (Ed.), Estado actual de la clasificación de las lenguas indígenas de Colombia (pp. 75–125). Bogotá: Instituto Caro y Cuervo.
- Curnow, Timothy J. (1998). Why Paez is not a Barbacoan language: The nonexistence of "Moguex" and the use of early sources. International Journal of American Linguistics, 64 (4), 338-351.
- Curnow, Timothy J.; & Liddicoat, Anthony J. (1998). The Barbacoan languages of Colombia and Ecuador. Anthropological Linguistics, 40 (3).
- Douay, Léon. (1888). Contribution à l'américanisme du Cauca (Colombie). Compte-Rendu du Congrès International des Américanistes, 7, 763-786.
- Gerdel, Florence L. (1979). Paez. In Aspectos de la cultura material de grupos étnicos de Colombia 2, (pp. 181–202). Bogota: Ministerio de Gobierno and Instituto Lingüístico de Verano.
- Kaufman, Terrence. (1990). Language history in South America: What we know and how to know more. In D. L. Payne (Ed.), Amazonian linguistics: Studies in lowland South American languages (pp. 13–67). Austin: University of Texas Press. ISBN 0-292-70414-3.
- Kaufman, Terrence. (1994). The native languages of South America. In C. Mosley & R. E. Asher (Eds.), Atlas of the world's languages (pp. 46–76). London: Routledge.
- Key, Mary R. (1979). The grouping of South American languages. Tübingen: Gunter Narr Verlag.
- Landaburu, Jon. (1993). Conclusiones del seminario sobre clasificación de lenguas indígenas de Colombia. In (M. L. Rodríguez de Montes (Ed.), Estado actual de la clasificación de las lenguas indígenas de Colombia (pp. 313–330). Bogotá: Instituto Caro y Cuervo.
- Loukotka, Čestmír. (1968). Classification of South American Indian languages. Los Angeles: Latin American Studies Center, University of California.
- Slocum, Marianna C. (1986). Gramática páez (p. vii, 171). Lomalinda: Editorial Townsend.
- Stark, Louisa R. (1985). Indigenous languages of lowland Ecuador: History and current status. In H. E. Manelis Khan & L. R. Stark (Eds.), South American Indian languages: Retrospect and prospect (pp. 157–193). Austin: University of Texas Press.
