= Pasto language =

Extinct language of Colombia and Ecuador

Pasto
- Native to: Colombia, Ecuador
- Ethnicity: Pasto people
- Extinct: (date missing)
- Language family: Barbacoan: Awan; Pasto–Muellamués; Pasto

Language codes
- ISO 639-3: None (mis)
- Glottolog: past1243
- Linguasphere: 81-HAA-bc

Pasto is a poorly attested Barbacoan language that was spoken by Indigenous people of Pasto, Colombia and Carchi Province, Ecuador. It is now extinct.

== ISO issue ==
Prior to its retirement, the ISO name of the ISO code [bpb] was Barbacoas, the name of an extinct people who gave their name to the Barbacoan language family of which Pasto is a member, as well as to the Colombian town of Barbacoas. However, nothing is known of their language, one of several also known as Colima and Telembí, and it can only be assumed to be part of the Barbacoan family. Such unattested, long-extinct languages are not normally assigned ISO codes. MultiTree, however, further conflates Barbacoas with neighboring Pasto.

Glottolog distinguishes unclassifiable [past1243] 'Pasto' from unattested [barb1242] 'Barbacoas'.
