= Tsafiki language =

Barbacoan language spoken in Ecuador

Tsafiki
- Colorado
- Tsa'fiki
- Native to: Ecuador
- Ethnicity: Tsáchila
- Native speakers: (2,300 cited 2000)
- Language family: Barbacoan: Southern?; Tsafiki

Language codes
- ISO 639-3: cof
- Glottolog: colo1256
- ELP: Tsafiki
- Linguasphere: 81-HBB-aa
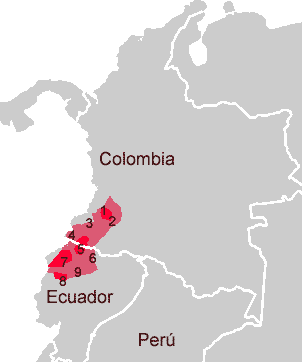
- 8 - Tsafiki

Tsafiki, also known as Tsachila or Colorado, is a Barbacoan language spoken in Ecuador by about 2,000 ethnic Tsáchila people.

== Phonology ==
=== Consonants ===
		Bilabial	Dental	Alveolar	Palatal	Velar	Glottal
Stop	voiceless	p	t			k	ʔ
Stop	voiced	b	d				ʔ
Affricate				t͡s			
Fricative		ɸ		s			h
Nasal		m		n			
Lateral				l			
Flap				ɹ ~ ɾ			
Semivowel				ɹ ~ ɾ	j	w	

- /b, d/ are preglottalized [ˀb, ˀd] when occurring intervocalically.
- /k/ can become voiced [ɡ] when intervocally after nasal sounds.
- /ɹ/ is heard as [ɾ] when occurring word-initially, and when following a nasalized vowel, an allophone [n] occurs.
- /s/ is heard as [ʃ] when preceding high vowels /i, u/ and after unaccented high vowels.
- /t͡s/ is heard as [t͡ʃ] when preceding high vowels, but many speakers pronounce it as [t͡ʃ] in all environments.

=== Vowels ===
Tsafiki has five vowels. Four vowels have nasalized forms.

	Front	Central	Back
High	i		u
Mid	e		o
Low		a	

	Front	Central	Back
High	ĩ		ũ
Mid	ẽ		
Low		ã	

- Unaccented vowels before voiceless stops are often devoiced [ḁ].

== Morphology ==
=== Evidentiality ===
Tsafiki has a four-way evidentiality system. Unmarked verbs indicate "direct" witness.

Manuel ano fi-e
Manuel food eat-VIS+DECL
'Manuel ate' (speaker saw him)

-nu- is used when it is inferred from physical evidence.

Manuel ano fi-n-ki-e
Manuel food eat-INFR-DECL
'Manuel ate' (speaker sees dishes)
