= Awa Pit language =

Barbacoan language of Colombia and Ecuador

Awa Pit
- Cuaiquer
- Awa Pit
- Native to: Colombia, Ecuador
- Ethnicity: 15,000 Awa-Kwaiker (2007)
- Native speakers: 13,000 (2008)
- Language family: Barbacoan: Awan; Awa Pit

Language codes
- ISO 639-3: kwi
- Glottolog: awac1239
- ELP: Awa Pit
- Linguasphere: 81-HAA-a
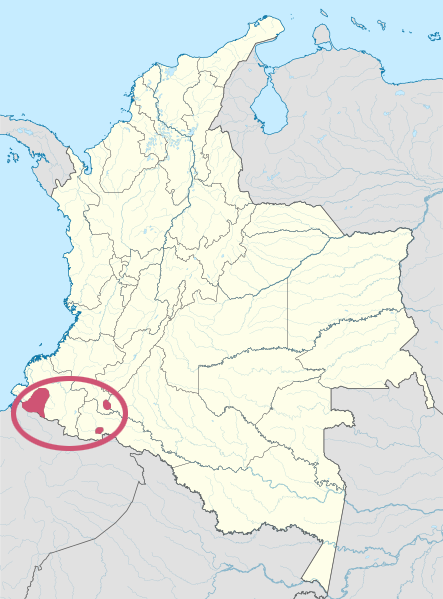

- Awapit is classified as Severely Endangered by the UNESCO Atlas of the World's Languages in Danger Awa Cuaiquer is classified as Critically Endangered by the UNESCO Atlas of the World's Languages in Danger.

Awa Pit, otherwise known as Cuaiquer (Coaiquer, Cuayquer, Kwaiker, Kwayquer, etc.), is a Barbacoan language. Awa Pit is classified by UNESCO as a severely endangered language. The Awa Pit language has a subject–object–verb structure and has adopted the Latin script. Grammatically, Awa Pit uses a characteristic conjunct/disjunct system of verb suffixes for person-marking.

== Speakers and characteristics ==
The Awa Pit language has around 21 thousand speakers, mostly residing on the Colombian Pacific slopes of the Andes, with about a thousand in an adjacent area of Ecuador. The Awa Pit language is spoken less and less each year. In a study done in 2008 there were about 12,000 Awa Pit speakers, but as of 2011 there are about 2,100 speakers left in the provinces of northern Ecuador. Most Awa women are monolingual to the Awa Pit language, while some men can speak both Spanish and Awa Pit and a very few of these Awa Pit speakers can both read and write the language. Literacy among Awa speakers is less than 1% in their native language and under 5% in the secondary Spanish language. The Awa people are mostly farmers. Their crops include plantains, corn, sugarcane, and beans. Many of the Awa do not live near each other, they live in scattered settlements often 2-3 kilometers apart, and often move depending on the planting and harvesting seasons.

== Phonology ==
The Awa Pit inventory is as follows:

=== Consonants ===
Consonant phonemes
		Bilabial	Dental/Alveolar		Palatal	Velar
		Bilabial	plain	lateral	Palatal	Velar
Nasal		m	n		(ɲ)	ŋ
Plosive		p	t̪			k
Fricative	voiceless		s	ɬ	ʃ	
Fricative	voiced		z		ʒ	
Approximant				l	j	w

- Some dialects can also have phonemic retroflex sounds /ʂ/, /tʂ/
- Geminated consonants are noted as [pː, t̪ː, kː].
- [ɲ] is the main sound of the consonant sequence /nj/
- In word-final positions, there are two realizations for each stop consonant; unreleased [p̚, t̪̚, k̚], or post nasal [pᵐ, t̪ⁿ̪, kᵑ].

Phoneme	Allophone	Rules
/p/ [p]	[b]	C [v] __ [v]
/p/ [p]	[ɸ]	C [fricative] [vl] __ V [v]
/p/ [p]	[β]	V/G [v] __ V/G [v]
/p/ [p]	[pʷ]	__ /ɨ/
/t/ [t̪]	[d̪]	C [v] __ [v]
/t/ [t̪]	[θ]	C [fricative] [vl] __ V [v]
/t/ [t̪]	[ð]	C [fricative] [v] __ V [v]
/t/ [t̪]	[ɾ̪]	V/G [v] __ V/G [v]
/k/ [k]	[ɡ]	C [v] __ [v]
/k/ [k]	[x]	C [fricative] [vl] __ V [v]
/k/ [k]	[ɣ]	V/G [v] __ V/G [v]
/s/ [s]	[ts]	#__, C [vl] __, C [v] __ V [vl]
/s/ [s]	[dz]	C [v] __ V [v]
/ʃ/ [ʃ]	[tʃ]	#__, C [vl] __, C [v] __ V [vl]
/ʃ/ [ʃ]	[dʒ]	C [v] __ V [v]
/ɬ/ [ɬ]	[h]	__ /u, u̥/
/ɬ/ [ɬ]	[ɬ] ~ [h]	/i̥, ɨ̥/ __, __ /ɨ̥, i̥/
/l/ [l]	[ʎ] ~ [ᵈl]	{i j}__
/l/ [l]	[l] ~ [ᵈl] ~ [d]	__ C, __#
/l/ [l]	[l] ~ [ᵈl]	elsewhere
/m/ [m]	[mʷ]	__ /ɨ/
/n/ [n]	[ŋ]	__ C [velar]
/n/ [n]	[n] ~ [ɲ]	V [high] __ V [high]
/nj/ [ɲ]	[ɲ] ~ [j̃]	V__ /a/
/nj/ [ɲ]	[ɲ]	__ /a/
/j/ [j]	[j] ~ [ɟ]	V __ V

=== Vowels ===
Vowel phonemes
	Front	Central	Back
Close	i iː	ɨ ɨː	u uː
Open		a aː	

Voiceless vowels
	Front	Central	Back
Close	i̥	ɨ̥	u̥

Phoneme	Allophone	Rules
/i/ [i]	[i] ~ [e]	__ #
/i/ [i]	[ɪ]	in closed syllables, short or lax
/ɨ/ [ɨ]	[ɨ] ~ [e]	__ # (words of more than one syllable)
/ɨ/ [ɨ]	[ɨ̞]	in closed syllables, short or lax
/u/ [u]	[u] ~ [o]	__ #
/u/ [u]	[ʊ]	in closed syllables, short or lax
/a/ [ä]	[ɔ]	/w/__ C [velar]
/a/ [ä]	[æ] ~ [ɛ] ~ [ə]	C [palatal] __, in a closed syllable
/a/ [ä]	[äj] ~ [ä]	__ C [fricative, palato-alveolar]
/a/ [ä]	[ɐ]	in closed syllables, short or lax

== Orthography ==
Orthography of Awa Pit
Uppercase	A	Ã	Ch	E	Ẽ	I	Ĩ	Ih	Ɨ	Ɨ̃	Ɨh	J	K	L	M	N
Lowercase	a	ã	ch	e	ẽ	i	ĩ	ih	ɨ	ɨ̃	ɨh	j	k	l	m	n
Uppercase	Ñ	P	R	S	Sh	T	U	Ũ	Uh	V	W	Y	Z	Zh	Ꞌ	
Lowercase	ñ	p	r	s	sh	t	u	ũ	uh	v	w	y	z	zh	ꞌ	

== Word forms ==
=== Possessive word forms ===
Possessive word formations in Awa Pit can be used to decipher or specify a certain kind of function or occurrence. These range from location-object, material-object, whole-parts of something, and definitions very reminiscent of English prepositions. This is partly because of the usage of ‘relational nouns’. Possession seems to be the main connection that these functions have and in the case of Awa Pit, the postposition pa is a known marker or using possessive adjectives is another way. It is also explained that “In some cases, however, there is an alternation between a possessive postposition with pa, a possessive adjective, and a bare noun modifier, where the bare noun acting as a modifier must occur directly before the noun it modifies [...] the alternation between these constructions can be seen to depend on humanness and referentiality”. This means that if a modifying noun is labelled human and referential then a postpositional word form is utilized. A possessive adjective is used instead if the non-head part is considered pronominal.

Santos=pa pimpul
Santos=POSS leg
‘Santos's leg’

ap pimpul
my leg
‘my leg’

kwizha pimpul
dog leg
‘the leg of (a/the) dog’

awa=wa pit
Person=POSS language/tongue
‘(the) person's tongue [most likely]; (the) person's way of speaking [unlikely]’

awa pit
person language/tongue
‘the language of the people (Awa Pit) [most likely]; human tongues [unlikely]’

“Ideas of alienable possession and kinship relations necessarily involve the use of the postpositional or possessive adjective constructions (with the exception of “plural possessive adjectives”), rather than a bare noun modifier”.

Alienable possession and kinship are basically referencing humans but there are a few cases where possession are fluid enough to contain higher animals therefore treating it like as if it was human (Awa Pit ‘personifies it in question’).

kwizha=wa pelota
dog=POSS ball
‘the dog's ball’

=== Plural possessive adjectives ===
Singular possessive adjectives happen in the assumed slot and descriptive adjectives happen between the possessive adjective and the main head noun itself:

ap katsa tɨl kuzhu
my big black pig
‘my big black pig’

There are no specific plural possessive adjective constructions because “In order to translate a phrase such as our house, speakers of Awa Pit have two options: the more common option is to simply use the singular possessive adjective:”

ap yal
my house
‘my house, our house’

There is another option and that is to use the plural subject pronoun (unmalleable) into the bare noun modifier: (no adjectives can get between the pronoun and the subsequent noun)

au yal
we house
‘our house’

=== Alienable possession and kinship relations ===
Non-head nominal is considered referential and human, and the involvement of pa or a possessive adjective is needed. Kinship relations are similar to alienable possession but is different when it comes to body-part possession because the non-head noun is not considered human nor referential. Essentially in Awa Pit, there is no difference between alienable and inalienable possession in an NP. That is due to the fact that different forms are reserved for referential human possession no matter the possession's nature.

Santos=pa kuzhu
Santos=POSS pig
‘Santos's pig’

Carmen=pa ayshpihsh
Carmen=POSS sister
‘Carmen's sister’

paynya cuchillo
his knife
‘his knife’

ap akkwa
my mother
‘my mother’

=== Whole-part ===
Part whole relations are incorporated in the same fashion as possession in Awa Pit. In this case, the whole acts as a modifier while the part acts as the head noun. The modifier whole could be a referential human and that means that the formation with pa or a possessive adjective are utilized. Non-referential human or non-humans traced with bare-nouns are likely to be used as well. It is also worth mentioning that Awa Pit is a Barbacoa language that specializes in placing part-whole relationships with a bare noun or a ‘genitive marker’.

Santos=pa sayl
Santos=POSS arm
‘Santos's arm’

ap pimpul
my leg
‘my leg’

awa kɨzpu
person head
‘a human's head’

tɨ aya
tree skin
‘(tree) bark’

=== Inflections ===
In terms of tense inflections, there are formal markers when referring to the past and the future in Awa Pit, and there is also an extra subtle category that helps express the present. Basically, if a marker for the past or future does not display itself in a sentence, then the string of inflections most likely represents the present. It is worth saying that the present is marked by a zero morpheme in a ‘pure structuralist form’, since tense markers happen after mood suffixes just before any person markers can appear.

ku-mtu-ata-w
eat-IMPF-PAST-LOCUT:SUBJ
'I was eating.'

ku-mtu-anɨ-s
eat-IMPF-FUT-LOCUT
'I will be eating.'

ku-mtu-s
eat-IMPF-LOCUT
'I am eating.'

There are also mood inflections that display a variety of meanings and discover a less cooperative group than the rest in semantically and syntactically manners. The mood marker na is only utilized for past counterfactual clauses such as before tense marking and after person marking. An s would be used for Locutor while an unmarked form would go for the Non-Locutor. Negation and interrogation inflections are only used for content question forms or by going through auxiliary verbs. The inflectional marker ma is considered both a negative inflectional marker and a ‘homophonous interrogative marker’ at the same time.

== Sentence structure ==
Parts of speech in Awa Pit include nouns, pronouns, adjectives, verbs, post-positions, adverbs, interjections, and discourse particles. The language's sentence structure is AOV or SV (subject-verb).

=== Constituent order ===
Subject	Temporal adjuncts	Locational adjuncts	Circumstantial adjuncts	Non-subject complements	Manner adverbials	Verb

- Temporal adjuncts: when, how long, or how frequent the action happened
- Locational adjuncts: where the action happened
- Circumstantial adjuncts: adds information about the action
- Non-subject complements:
- Manner adverbials: tell how something happens (happily, tragically, simply, gently, etc.)

=== Noun phrase construction ===
Either: Possessive adjective; Demonstrative adjective; Postpositional phrase	Quantifier	Descriptive Adjective	Noun

=== Word classes ===
Discourse particles
=na	Topic marker
=miŋ	Restrictive marker
=kas	Additive marker
=ma	Interrogative marker
=ma	Temporal marker
=ka	Emphasis marker

=== Noun phrase with demonstrative adjective ===
an kɨh
this leaf
DemAdj N
“This leaf.”

=== Noun phrase ===
katsa yal
big house
ADJ N
“A large house”

=== Noun phrase (past) ===
wakata ii-tɨ-zi
cattle die-PAST-NONLOCUT
“The cow died”

=== Plural possessive adjectives ===
au yal
we house
“Our house.”

-a speaker can use singular form or the plural subject pronoun

=== Noun phrase (actor-object-verb) ===
The next two examples shows Unmarked nature of S and A, and the division of O between referential human (accusatory) and other (unmarked)

Demetrio na-wa pyan-tɨ-tɨ-s
Demetrio 1SG-ACC hit-TERM-PAST-LOCUT:UNDER
A {O (ref. human)} V
“Demetrio hit me.”

Demetrio kuzhu pay-t kway-zi
Demetrio pig buy-SV DROP-NONLOCUT
A {O (not ref. human)} V {}
“Demetrio bought a pig.”

=== Transitive verbs ===
na=na Santos=ta namna-mtu-s
1SG.(NOM)=TOP Santos=ACC follow/catch:up-IMPF-LOCUT
SUBJ OBJ V
“I am following Santos.”

=== Ditransitive verbs ===
Camilo=na na-wa pala kwin-tɨ-s
Camilo=TOP 1SG-ACC plantain give-PAST-LOCUT:UNDER
SUBJ OBJ(1‍) OBJ(2‍) V
“Camilo gave me a plantain.”

=== Postpositional phrase ===
[mesa=ta libro] kwin-zha
[table=in book] give-IMP.1OBJ
LOC.PP Noun {}
“Give me the book on the table.”

=== Causative ===
tɨnta awa uk man ki-nin-tu
strong person stone move(1‍) move((2‍)-CAUS-IMPFPART
“The strong man moved the stone (caused the stone to move).”

=== Semblative postposition ===
shitshu=kana kwiyan-tu=na
bird=like cry-IMPFPART=TOP
“She cries like a bird.”
