= Indigenous peoples in Colombia =

Native Colombians
Colombianos nativos (Spanish)
- Flag of the Indigenous Colombians

Total population
- ▲1,905,617 (2018 Census) ▲4.31% of the Colombian population c. 3,740,000 (Estimation); ~7.1% of the Colombian population 2%–7.1%

Regions with significant populations
- Throughout the country, especially in the Amazonía Region, Andean region and Caribbean Region
- La Guajira: 394,683
- Cauca: 308,455
- Nariño: 206,455
- (Córdoba Department) Córdoba: 202,621
- (Sucre Department) Sucre: 104,890

Languages
- Spanish • Indigenous languages (including Wayuu, Sinúfana, Páez, Emberá)

Religion
- Majority: Roman Catholicism; Minority: Native American religions

Related ethnic groups
- Other Indigenous peoples of the Americas and Mestizo Colombians

Indigenous peoples in Colombia (Spanish: Pueblos indígenas en Colombia), also known as Native Colombians (Spanish: Colombianos nativos), are the Indigenous peoples of the Americas whose ancestors lived in Colombia before the 16th-century Spanish colonization of Colombia.

Estimates of the percentage of Colombians who are Indigenous vary, from 3% or 1.5 million to 10% or 5 million. According to the 2018 Colombian census, they comprise 4.4% of the country's population, belonging to 115 different tribal nations, up from 3.4% in the 2005 Colombian census. However, a Latinobarómetro survey from the year 2024 found that 75 people or 7.1% of Colombian respondents self-identified as Indigenous. The percentage of Indigenous peoples has been growing since an all-time low of 1965, where it was estimated only 1% of Colombians were Indigenous.

Approximately two-thirds of the registered Indigenous peoples live in La Guajira, Cauca, Nariño, Córdoba and Sucre Departments. More than 70 distinct Indigenous ethnic groups live in the sparsely populated Amazon basin of Colombia.

Both historically and in recent times, Indigenous peoples have endured violence and oppression, ranging from land theft to massacres to the targeted killings of Indigenous activists and politicians.

== Population history ==
In the pre-Columbian era, the total population of Colombia had an estimated 6 million people. However, after Spanish conquest, the population of Colombia was lowered to only 750,000 people in which Native people made up 80% of the population, at 600,000. That percentage would lower after independence, when the population grew to 1.327 million, of which Native people made up 53% of the population, at 700,000.

In the 1912 census, the Native population accounted for 6.3% of the people, down from the 17.8% reported in 1852. By the 1993 census, that number had further lowered to 1%. However, increased recognition from the government made the proportion of registered Indigenous people grow to 3.4% in the 2005 census and further to 4.3% in the 2018 census. The demographic decline can be explained by liberal policies implemented by new republican elites, which tried to abolish Indigenous collective land ownership, which had been recognized by the Spanish monarchy, and they forced Natives to assimilate in mainstream national culture.

As of 2023, the total population of Colombia has grown significantly to around 52 million people in which full-blooded Native people are estimated to make up around 10% of the population, at 5.2 million. The increase is caused by the raised awareness among Colombians about their Indigenous identity and from the 1991 constitution, which gave more legal rights to Indigenous communities.

Despite the reduction in the percentage of the total population, Native people make up a large part of the genetic ancestry of Colombians. A study determined that the average Colombian (of all races) has a mixture of 47% Amerindian, 42% European, and 11% African, with Native people having the most significant contribution in the study.

Indigenous Colombians 1600–2023
Year	Population	% of Colombia
1600	600,000	80%
1825	700,000	▼53%
1852	421,000	▼17.8%
1912	344,198	▼6.79%
1918	158,428	▼2.71%
1938	100,422	▼1.15%
1951	157,791	▲1.37%
1964	119,180	▼0.68%
1973	383,629	▲1.86%
1985	237,759	▼0.79%
1993	532,233	▲1.61%
2005	1,392,623	▲3.40%
2018	1,905,617	▲4.31%
2023 (Estimation)	c. 5,200,000	▲10%
Source: Colombian census (Note: The reason for the discrepancy has mainly to do with Indigenous Colombians being undercounted in the censuses and/or choosing to identify with a different race.)

== History ==
Some theories claim the earliest human habitation of South America to be as early as 43,000 BC, but the current scholarly consensus among archaeologists is that human habitation in South America only dates back to around 15,000 BC at the earliest. Anthropologist Tom Dillehay dates the earliest hunter-gatherer cultures on the continent at almost 10,000 BC, during the late Pleistocene and early Holocene periods. According to his evidence based on rock shelters, Colombia's first human inhabitants were probably concentrated along the Caribbean coast and on the Andean highland slopes. By that time, these regions were forested and had a climate resembling today's. Dillehay has noted that Tibitó, located just north of Bogotá, is one of the oldest known and most widely accepted sites of early human occupation in Colombia, dating from about 9,790 BC. There is evidence that the highlands of Colombia were occupied by significant numbers of human foragers by 9,000 BC, with permanent village settlement in northern Colombia by 2,000 BC.

Beginning in the 1st millennium BC, groups of Amerindians including the Muisca, Quimbaya, Tairona, Calima, Zenú, Tierradentro, San Agustín, Tolima, and Urabá became skilled in farming, mining, and metalcraft; and some developed the political system of cacicazgos with a pyramidal structure of power headed by caciques.

Colombia's Indigenous culture evolved from three main groups—the Quimbaya, who inhabited the western slopes of the Cordillera Central; the Chibchas; and the Kalina (Caribs). When the Spanish arrived in 1509, they found a flourishing and heterogeneous Amerindian population that numbered around 6 million, belonged to several hundred tribes, and largely spoke mutually unintelligible dialects. The two most advanced cultures of Amerindian peoples at the time were the Muisca and Taironas, who belonged to the Chibcha group and were skilled in farming, mining, and metalcraft. The Muisca lived mainly in the present departments of Cundinamarca and Boyacá, where they had fled centuries earlier after raids by the warlike Caribs, some of whom eventually migrated to Caribbean islands near the end of the first millennium A.D. The Taironas, who were divided into two subgroups, lived in the Caribbean lowlands and the highlands of the Sierra Nevada de Santa Marta. The Muisca civilization was well organized into distinct provinces governed by communal land laws and powerful caciques, who reported to one of the two supreme leaders.

Pre-Columbian

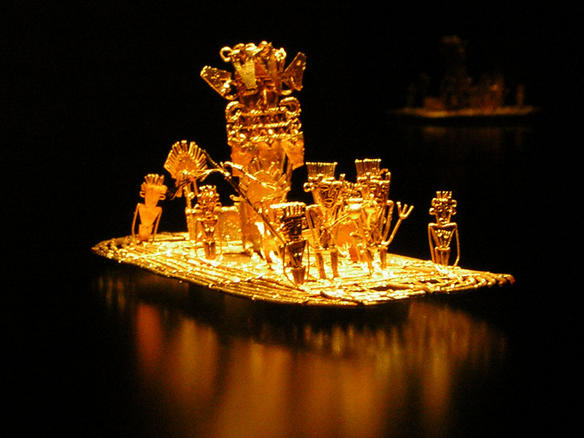
The zipa used to cover his body in gold and, from his Muisca raft, he offered treasures to the Guatavita goddess in the middle of the sacred lake. This old Muisca tradition became the origin of the El Dorado legend.

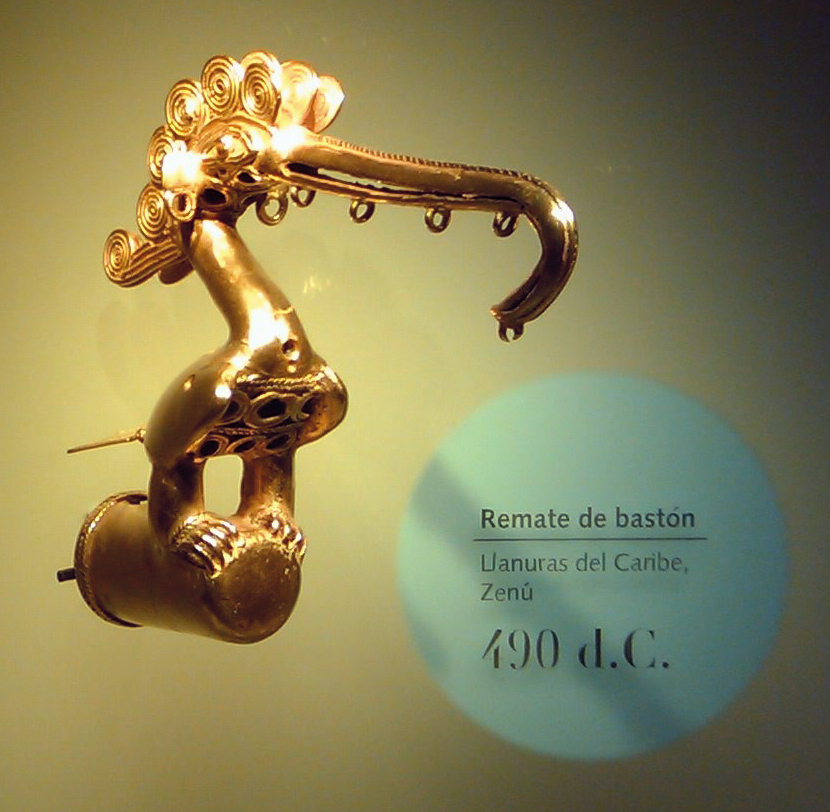
A lowland Zenú cast-gold bird ornament that served as a staff head, dated 490 CE. This culture used alloys with a high gold content. The crest of the bird consists of the typical Zenú semi-filigree. Regular filigree is braided wire, but the Zenú cast theirs.

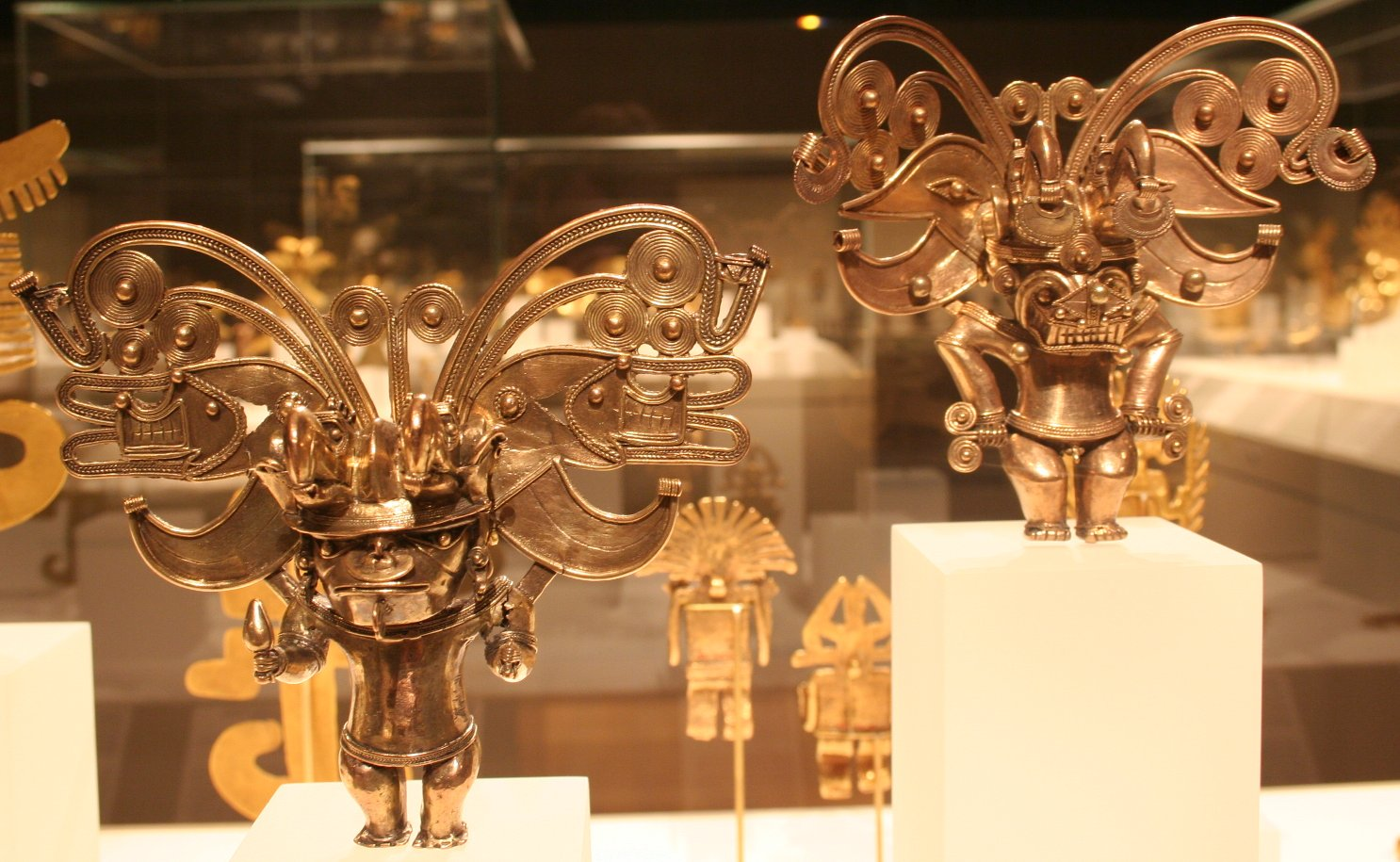
Tairona figure pendants in gold.

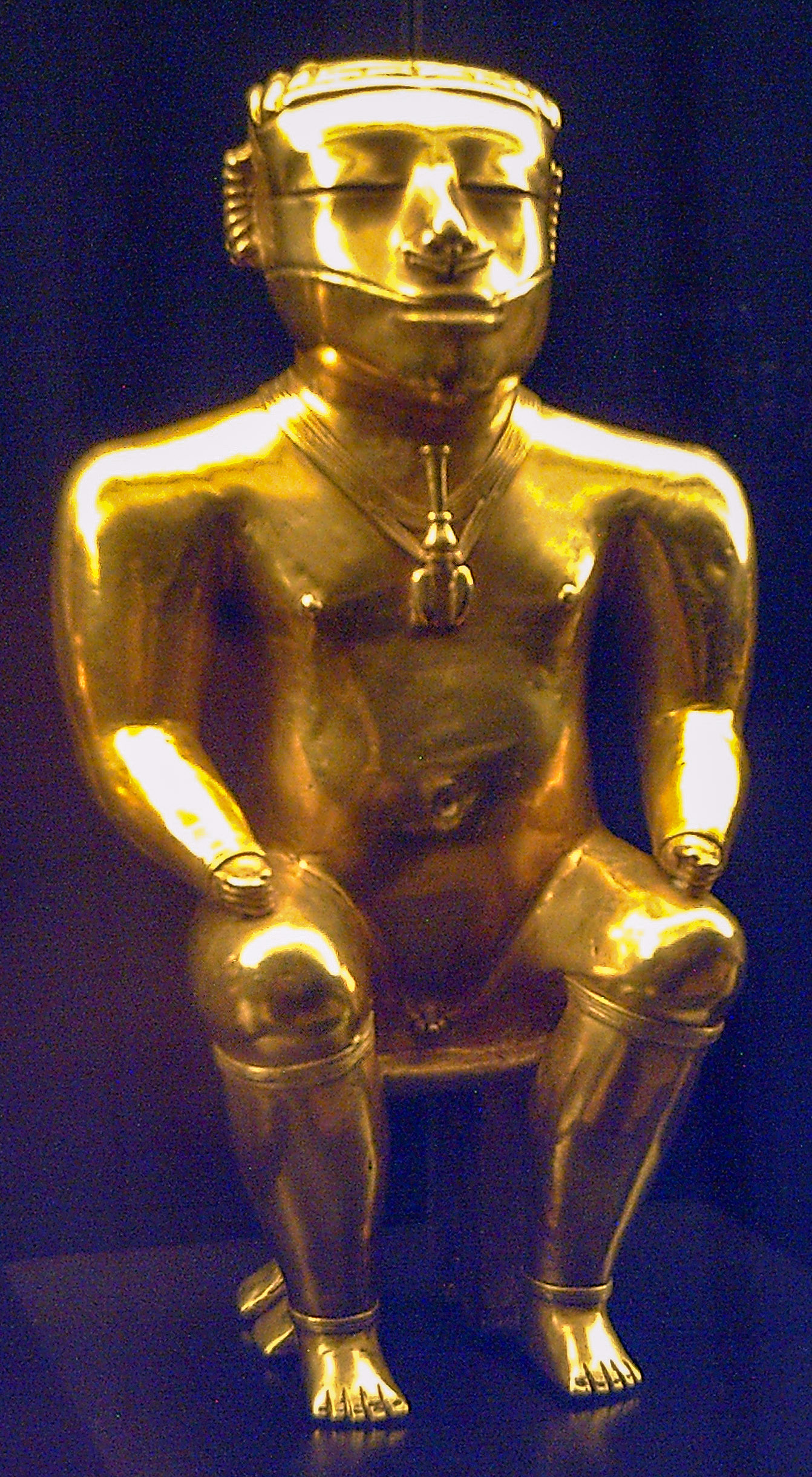
Golden statuette of a Quimbaya cacique.

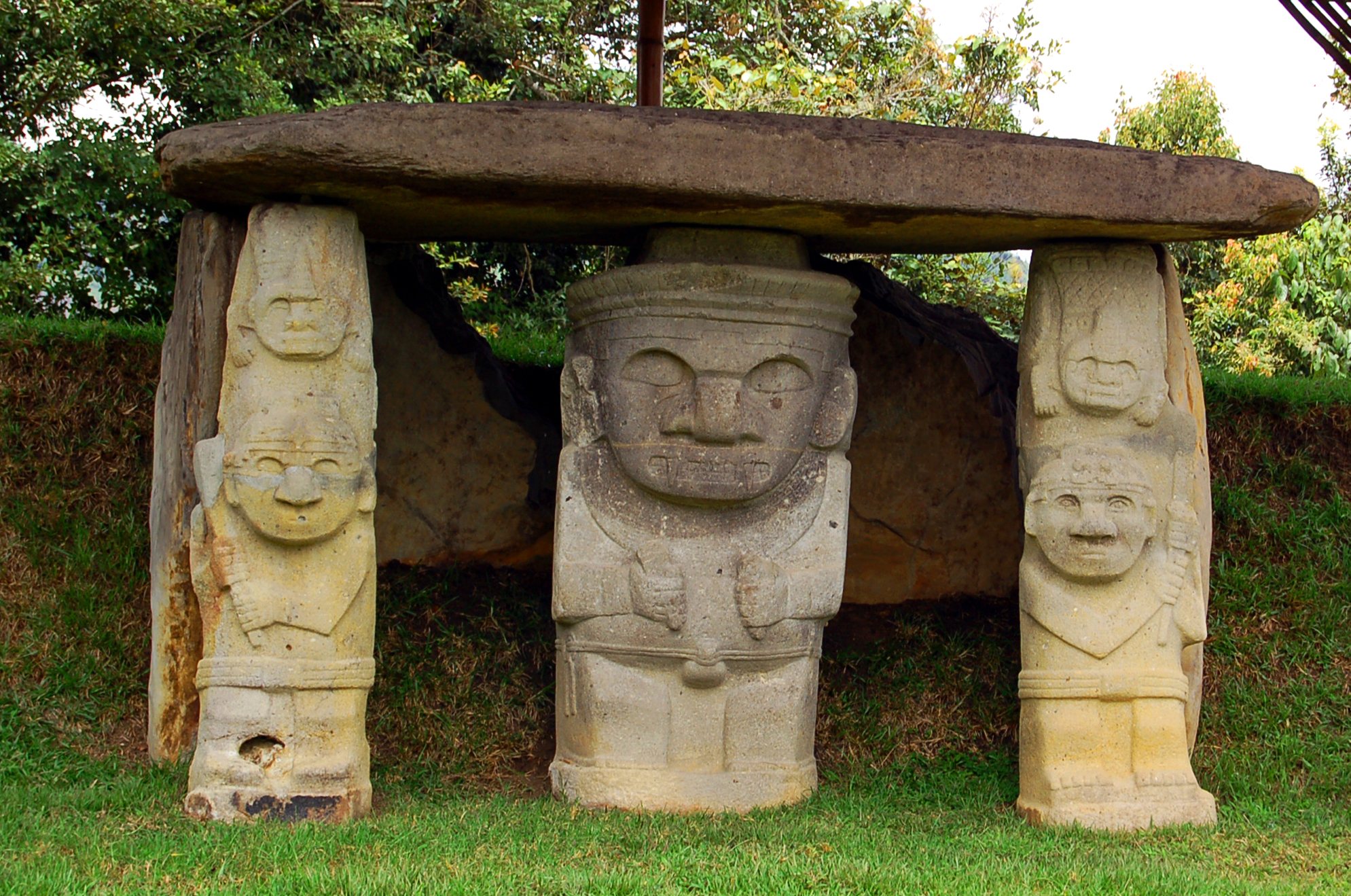
San Agustín Archaeological Park (UNESCO World Heritage Site), contains the largest collection of religious monuments and megalithic sculptures in Latin America and is considered the world's largest necropolis.

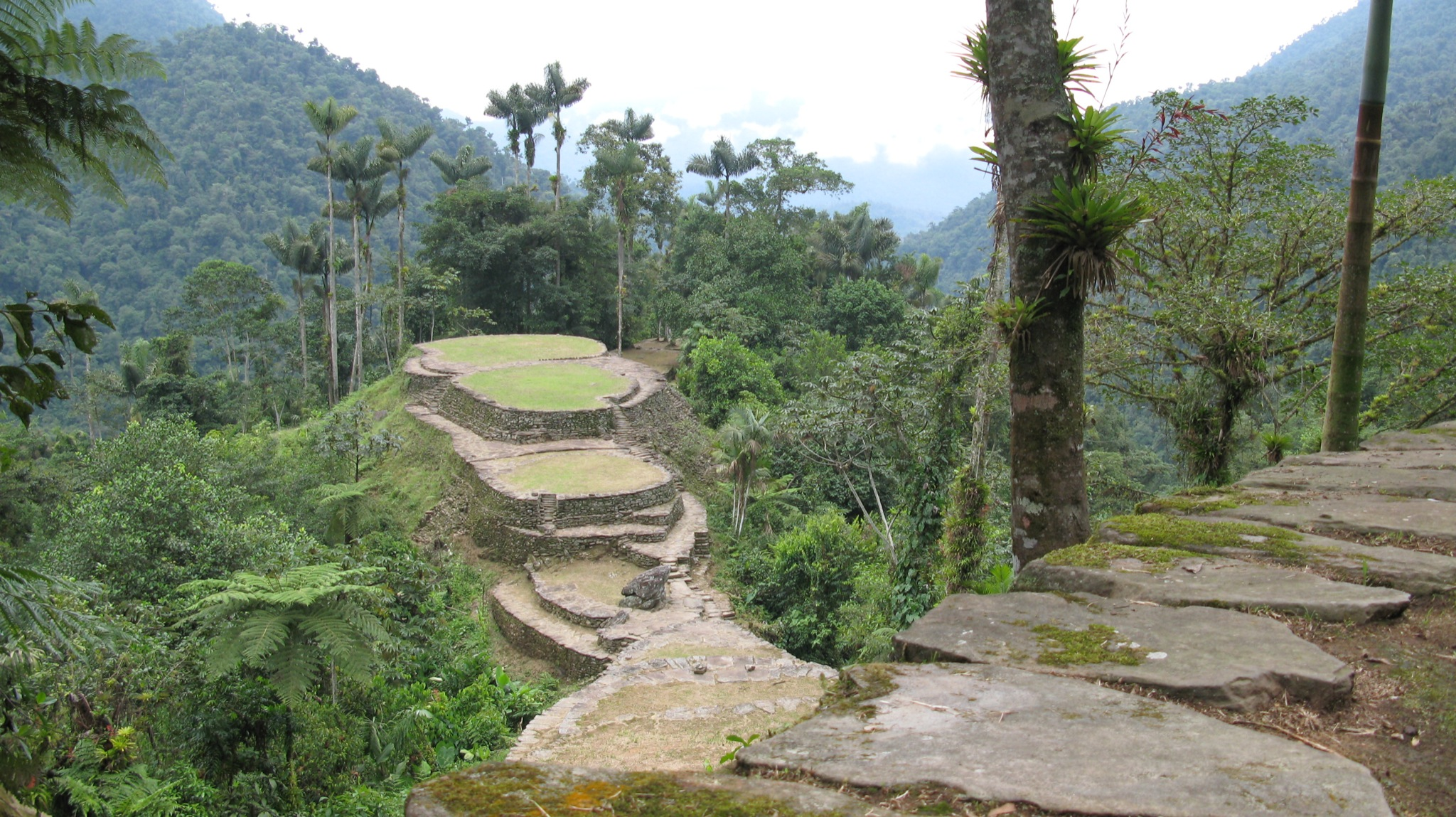
Ciudad Perdida is a major settlement believed to have been founded around 800 CE. It consists of a series of 169 terraces carved into the mountainside, a net of tiled roads and several small circular plazas. The entrance can only be accessed by a climb up some 1,200 stone steps through dense jungle.

=== Pre-Columbian history ===
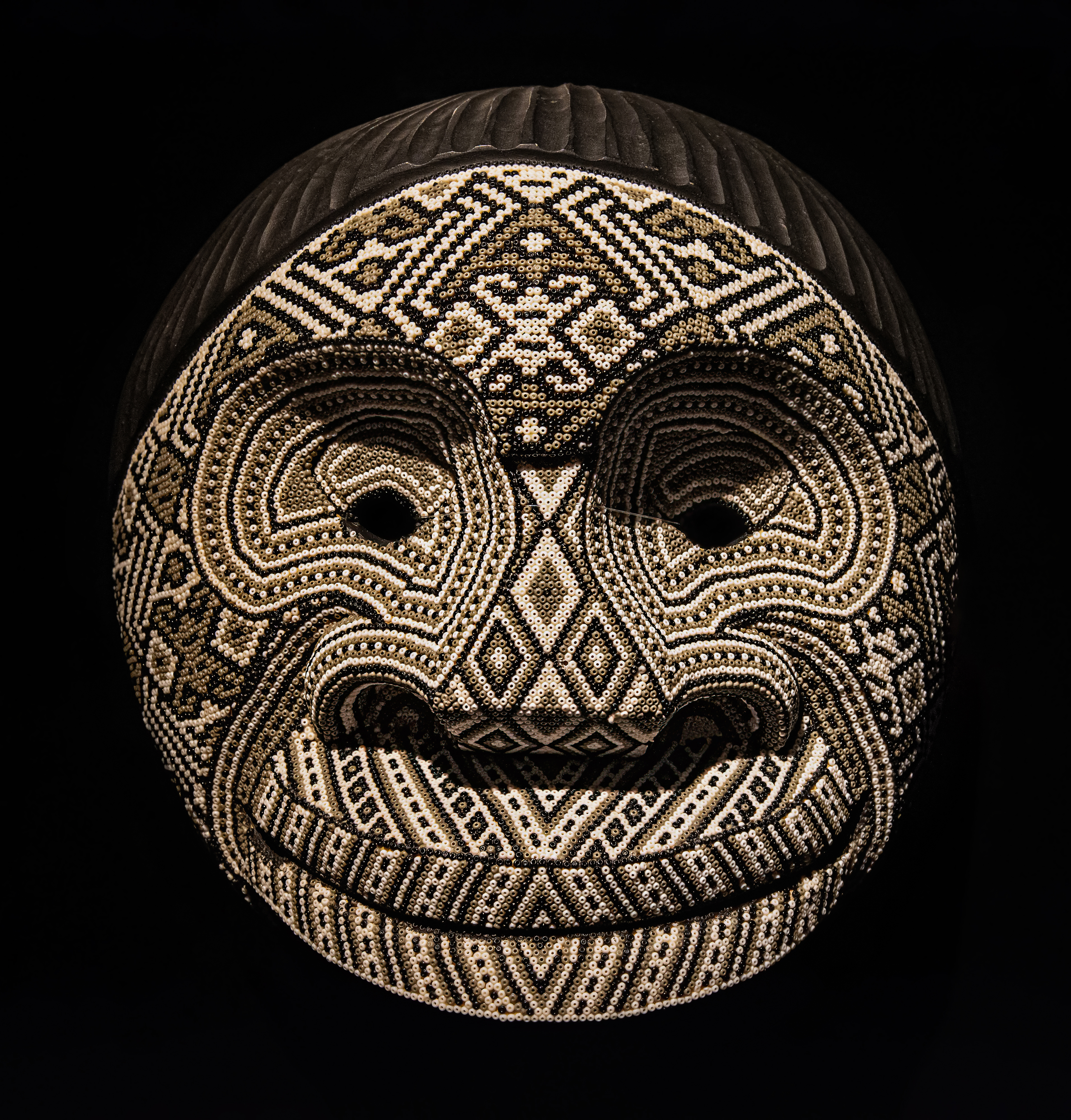
Chaquira-style beaded ceremonial mask made by a Kamëntšá artist

The complexity of Indigenous social organization and technology varieed tremendously, from stratified agricultural chiefdoms to tropical farm villages and nomadic hunting and food-gathering groups. At the end of the colonial period, the Native population still constituted about half of the total population. In the agricultural chiefdoms of the highlands, the Spaniards successfully imposed institutions designed to ensure their control of the Amerindians and thereby the use of their labor. The colonists had organized political and religious administration by the end of the 16th century, and they had begun attempts to religiously convert the Amerindians to Christianity, specifically Roman Catholicism.

The most important institution that regulated the lives and welfare of the highland Amerindians was the resguardo, a reservation system of communal landholdings. Under this system, Amerindians were allowed to use the land but could not sell it. Similar in some respects to the Native American reservation system of the United States, the resguardo has lasted with some changes even to the present and has been an enduring link between the government and the remaining highland tribes. As land pressures increased, however, encroachment of white or mestizo settlers onto resguardo lands accelerated, often without opposition from the government.

The government generally had not attempted to legislate in the past in matters affecting the forest Amerindians. During the colonial period, Roman Catholic missions were granted jurisdiction over the lowland tribes. With the financial support of the government, a series of agreements with the Holy See from 1887 to 1953 entrusted the evangelization and education of these Amerindians to the missions, which worked together with government agencies. Division of the resguardos stopped in 1958, and a new program of community development began to try to bring the Amerindians more fully into the national society.

The struggle of the Indigenous people on these lands to protect their holdings from neighboring landlords and to preserve their traditions continued into the late 20th century, when the 1991 constitution incorporated many of the Amerindian demands. New resguardos have been created, and others have been reconstituted, among forest tribes as well as highland communities. The 1991 constitution opened special political and social arenas for Indigenous and other minority groups. For example, it allowed for creation of a special commission to design a law recognizing the black communities occupying unsettled lands in the riverine areas of the Pacific Coast. Article 171 provides special Senate representation for Amerindians and other ethnic groups, while Article 176 provides special representation in the Chamber of Representatives: two seats "for the black communities, one for Indian communities, one for political minorities, and one for Colombians residing abroad". Article 356 guarantees Amerindian territorial and cultural rights, and several laws and decrees have been enacted protecting them. Article 356 refers somewhat vaguely to both "Indigenous territorial entities" and Indigenous resguardos.

By 1991, the country's 587 resguardos contained 800,271 people and including 60,503 families. The general regional distribution of these resguardos was as follows: Amazonia, 88; llanos, 106; Caribbean lowlands, 31; Andean highlands, 104; and Pacific lowlands, 258. They totaled 27,900,000 hectares (108,000 sq mi), or about 24 percent of the national territory. Colombia today may have as many as 710 resguardos in 27 of the 32 departments.

== Indigenous political organization ==
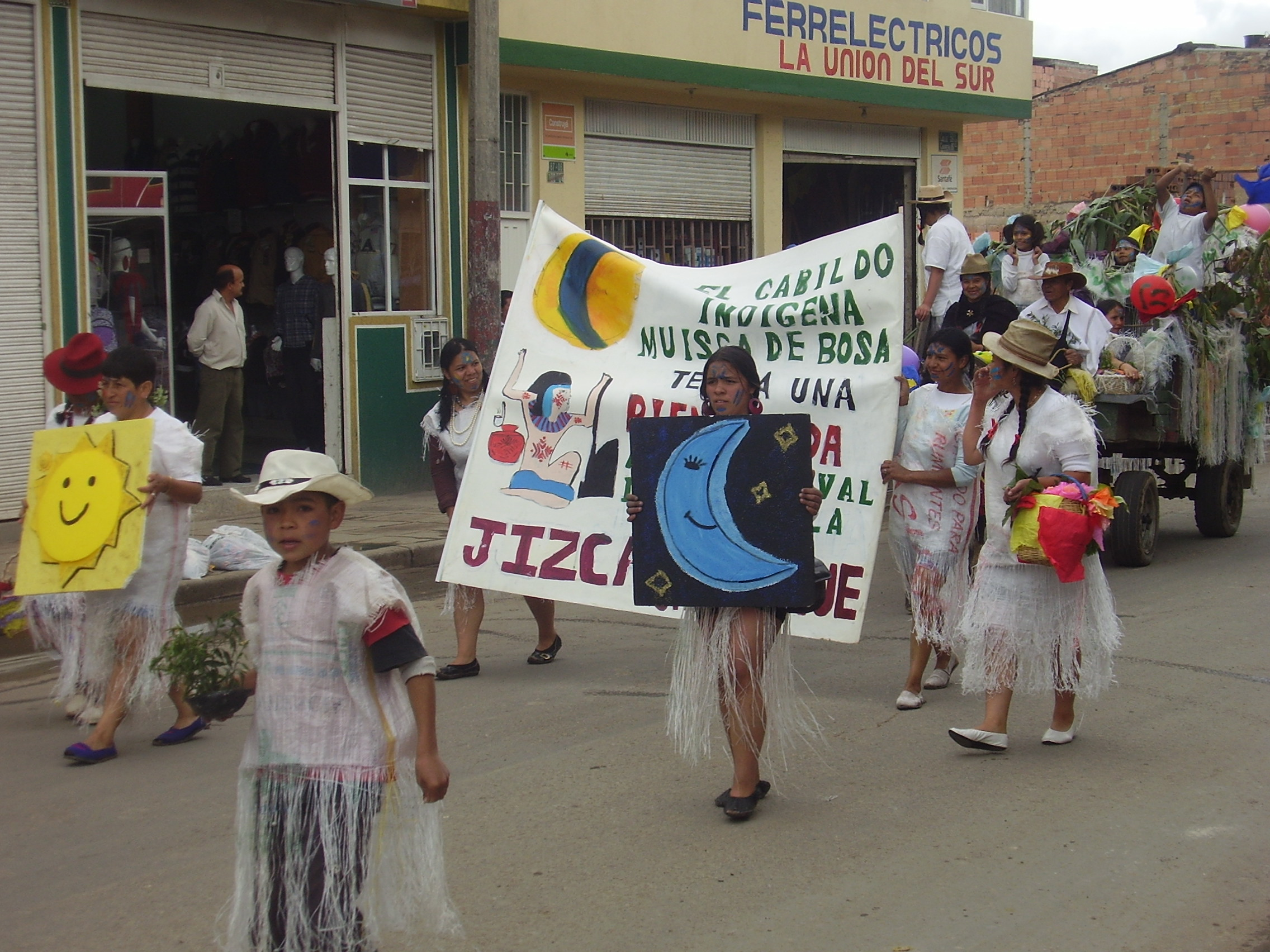
Muisca Community in the Colombian locality of Bosa, Bogotá.

Individual Indigenous groups have a variety of governance structures. A number of Indigenous groups are represented through the National Indigenous Organization of Colombia (ONIC - Organización Nacional Indígena de Colombia). Increasing organization and agitation have sharply broadened the Indigenous land base over the past forty years. The government titled more than 200 new reserves from 1960 to 1990, with 334 total operating as autonomous municipalities by 1997.

== Territories ==
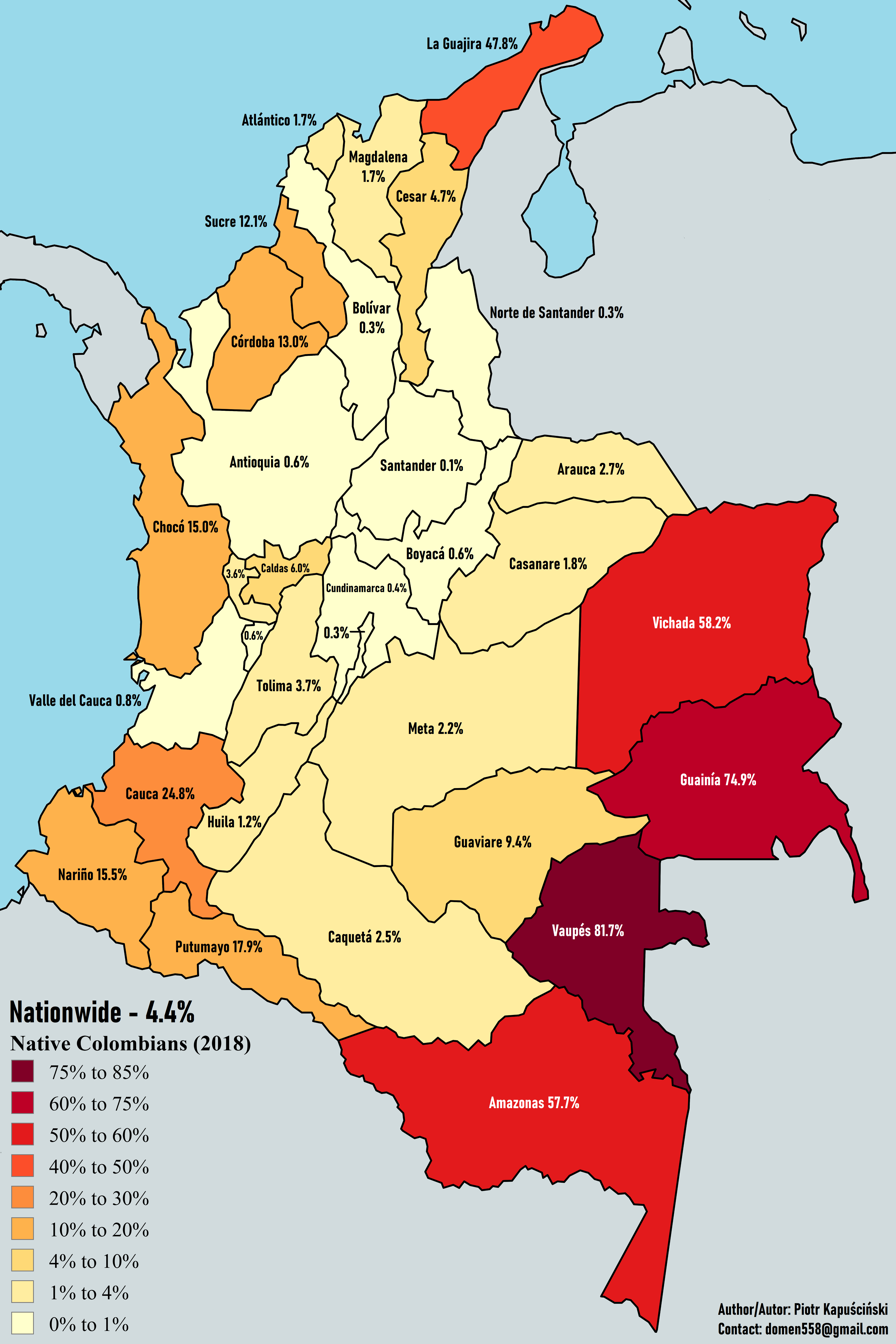
Distribution of Native Colombians according to the 2018 census

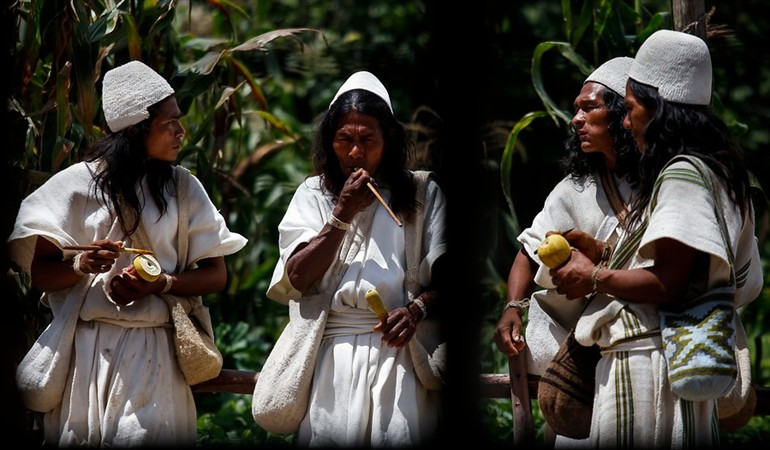
Arhuaco people in the Sierra Nevada de Santa Marta Mountains.

Indigenous peoples hold title to substantial portions of Colombia, primarily in the form of Indigenous Reserves (Spanish: resguardos), which encompass one-third of the country's land. The Indigenous Affairs division of the Ministry of Interior has 567 reserves on record, covering approximately 365,004 km^{2} which are home to 800,272 persons in 67,503 families.

The 1991 National Constitution of Colombia defined Territorial Entities (Entidades Territoriales) as departments, districts, municipalities and Indigenous territories. Within an Indigenous Territory Entity (ETI) the people have autonomy in managing their interests, and within the limits of the constitution have the right to manage resources and define taxes required to perform their duties. ETIs are to be defined by the government in conformance with the Organic Law on Land Management. However, this law has yet to be sanctioned so in practice the territories are unregulated.

== Territories with predominant Indigenous populations ==
=== Departments ===
According to ethnic self-identification. Data from the 2018 Colombian Census.
Department	Total population (2018)	Indigenous population	Percentage
Amazonas	66,056	38,130	57.7
Guainía	44,431	33,280	74.9
Vaupés	37,690	30,787	81.7
Vichada	76,642	44,578	58.2

=== Municipalities ===
Municipalities with predominant Indigenous population by self-identification.
Municipality	Predominant Indigenous group	Province	Department
El Encanto	Witoto	Amazonas	Amazonas
La Chorrera	Witoto	Amazonas	Amazonas
La Pedrera	Yucuna	Amazonas	Amazonas
La Victoria	Tanimuca	Amazonas	Amazonas
Leticia	Ticuna	Amazonas	Amazonas
Mirití-Paraná	Yucuna	Amazonas	Amazonas
Puerto Alegría	Witoto	Amazonas	Amazonas
Puerto Arica	Witoto	Amazonas	Amazonas
Puerto Nariño	Ticuna	Amazonas	Amazonas
Puerto Santander	Witoto	Amazonas	Amazonas
Tarapacá	Ticuna	Amazonas	Amazonas
Dabeiba	Emberá Katio	Western Antioquia	Antioquia
Frontino	Emberá Katio	Western Antioquia	Antioquia
Piojó	Mokaná	Western Atlántico	Atlántico
Tubará	Mokaná	Western Atlántico	Atlántico
Usiacurí	Mokaná	Central Atlántico	Atlántico
Cubará	U'wa	Cubará	Boyacá
Güicán de la Sierra	U'wa	Gutiérrez	Boyacá
Marmato	Emberá Katio	Upper Western Caldas	Caldas
Riosucio	Emberá Katio	Upper Western Caldas	Caldas
Supía	Emberá Katio	Upper Western Caldas	Caldas
Milán	Coreguaje	Caquetá	Caquetá
Solano	Witoto	Caquetá	Caquetá
Orocué	Sáliva	Casanare	Casanare
Almaguer	Yanacona	South Cauca	Cauca
Caldono	Nasa	Eastern Cauca	Cauca
Corinto	Nasa	North Cauca	Cauca
Inzá	Nasa	Eastern Cauca	Cauca
Jambaló	Nasa	Eastern Cauca	Cauca
La Vega	Yanacona	South Cauca	Cauca
Morales	Nasa	Central Cauca	Cauca
Páez	Nasa	Eastern Cauca	Cauca
Piamonte	Inga	South Cauca	Cauca
Piendamó	Misak	Central Cauca	Cauca
Puracé	Coconuco	Eastern Cauca	Cauca
San Sebastián	Yanacona	South Cauca	Cauca
Santa Rosa	Inga	South Cauca	Cauca
Silvia	Misak	Eastern Cauca	Cauca
Sotará	Nasa	Central Cauca	Cauca
Toribío	Nasa	Eastern Cauca	Cauca
Totoró	Nasa	Eastern Cauca	Cauca
Pueblo Bello	Ijka	North Cesar	Cesar
El Carmen de Atrato	Emberá Katio	Atrato	Chocó
Chimá	Zenú	Lower Sinú	Córdoba
Chinú	Zenú	Sabanas	Córdoba
Momil	Zenú	Lower Sinú	Córdoba
Purísima de la Concepción	Zenú	Lower Sinú	Córdoba
San Andrés de Sotavento	Zenú	Sabanas	Córdoba
Tuchín	Zenú	Sabanas	Córdoba
Barrancominas	Piapoco	Guainía	Guainía
Cacahual	Curripaco	Guainía	Guainía
Inírida	Puinave	Guainía	Guainía
La Guadalupe	Curripaco	Guainía	Guainía
Morichal	Puinave	Guainía	Guainía
Pana Pana	Curripaco	Guainía	Guainía
Puerto Colombia	Curripaco	Guainía	Guainía
San Felipe	Curripaco	Guainía	Guainía
Miraflores	Tucano	Guaviare	Guaviare
Íquira	Nasa	North Huila	Huila
Mapiripán	Sikuani	Southern Lower Ariari	Meta
Puerto Gaitán	Sikuani	Meta River	Meta
Aldana	Pasto	South Nariño	Nariño
Contadero	Pasto	South Nariño	Nariño
Córdoba	Pasto	South Nariño	Nariño
Cuaspud	Pasto	South Nariño	Nariño
Cumbal	Awá	South Nariño	Nariño
Guachucal	Pasto	South Nariño	Nariño
Ipiales	Cofán	South Nariño	Nariño
Mallama	Awá	Piedemonte Costero	Nariño
Potosí	Pasto	South Nariño	Nariño
Ricaurte	Awá	Piedemonte Costero	Nariño
Santacruz	Awá	Los Abades	Nariño
Sapuyes	Pasto	La Sabana	Nariño
Túquerres	Pasto	La Sabana	Nariño
Colón	Inga	Putumayo	Putumayo
Mocoa	Kamëntsá	Putumayo	Putumayo
Puerto Leguízamo	Witoto	Putumayo	Putumayo
San Francisco	Kamëntsá	Putumayo	Putumayo
San Miguel	Cofán	Putumayo	Putumayo
Santiago	Inga	Putumayo	Putumayo
Sibundoy	Kamëntsá	Putumayo	Putumayo
Orito	Emberá Chamí	Putumayo	Putumayo
Villagarzón	Inga	Putumayo	Putumayo
Mistrató	Emberá	Pacific Risaralda	Risaralda
Pueblo Rico	Emberá	Pacific Risaralda	Risaralda
Quinchía	Emberá Chamí	Western Risaralda	Risaralda
Palmito	Zenú	Morrosquillo	Sucre
Sampués	Zenú	Sabanas	Sucre
San José de Toluviejo	Zenú	Morrosquillo	Sucre
Coyaima	Pijao	South Tolima	Tolima
Natagaima	Pijao	South Tolima	Tolima
Ortega	Pijao	South Tolima	Tolima
Albania	Wayuu	Upper Guajira	La Guajira
Dibulla	Kogi	Upper Guajira	La Guajira
Distracción	Wayuu	Lower Guajira	La Guajira
Hatonuevo	Wayuu	Lower Guajira	La Guajira
Maicao	Wayuu	Upper Guajira	La Guajira
Manaure	Wayuu	Upper Guajira	La Guajira
Riohacha	Wayuu	Upper Guajira	La Guajira
Uribia	Wayuu	Upper Guajira	La Guajira
Carurú	Tucano	Vaupés	Vaupés
Mitú	Cubeo	Vaupés	Vaupés
Pacoa	Cubeo	Vaupés	Vaupés
Papunahua	Cubeo	Vaupés	Vaupés
Taraira	Tanimuca	Vaupés	Vaupés
Yavaraté	Cubeo	Vaupés	Vaupés

== Major ethnic groups ==
According to the National Indigenous Organization of Colombia (ONIC), there are 102 Indigenous groups in Colombia. The ethnic groups with the greatest number of members are the Wayuu (380,460), Zenú, (307,091), Nasa (243,176) and Pastos (163,873). These peoples account for 58.1% of Colombia's Indigenous population.

Highland peoples refer to the cultures of the Andes and the Sierra Nevada de Santa Marta of Colombia, while lowland peoples refer to the inhabitants of Chocó, Amazonía, Guajira and the Caribbean Coast, the Urabá Region and other non-mountain cultures.

Name	Traditional Language	Language Family	Population (2005)	Population (2018)
Wayuu	Wayuunaiki	Arawakan	270,413	380,460
Zenú	Zenú	Zenú	233,052	307,091
Nasa	Nasa Yuwe	Paezan	186,178	243,176
Pasto	Pasto	Barbacoan	129,801	163,873
Emberá Chamí	Chamí	Chocoan	29,094	77,714
Emberá	Cholo	Chocoan	37,327	56,504
Sikuani	Sikuani	Guahiban	19,791	52,361
Pijao	Pijao	Cariban	58,810	51,635
Emberá Katío	Catío	Chocoan	38,259	48,117
Awá	Awa Pit	Barbacoan	25,813	44,516
Mokaná	Mocana	Malibu	24,825	37,099
Yanacona	Yanacona	Quechuan	33,253	34,897
Arhuaco	Ikʉ	Chibchan	22,134	34,711
Misak	Namtrik	Barbacoan	21,085	21,713
Inga	Inga Kichwa	Quechuan	15,450	19,561
Wiwa	Wiwa	Chibchan	10,703	18,202
Coconuco	Coconuco	Barbacoan	16,492	18,135
Kankuamo	Kankui	Chibchan	12,714	16,986
Kogui	Kogi	Chibchan	9,173	15,820
Wounan	Wounan	Chocoan	9,066	14,825
Piapoco	Piapoco	Arawakan	3,508	14,661
Witoto	Witoto	Witotoan	No data	14,142
Cubeo	Cubeo	Tucanoan	3,926	14,074
Ticuna	Ticuna	Ticuna-Yuri	7,879	13,842
Muruí	Muruí	Witotoan	6,444	12,029
Baniwa	Karu	Arawakan	4,340	11,946
Muisca	Muysccubun	Chibchan	14,051	11,265
U'wa	Uw Cuwa	Chibchan	7,581	10,649
Puinave	Puinave	Puinave	4,318	8,984
Totoró	Totoró	Barbacoan	6,289	8,916
Kamëntsá	Camsá	Camsá	4,879	7,521
Quillacinga	Quillacinga	Quillacinga	No data	7,333
Eperara Siapidara	Eperara	Chocoan	3,853	7,047
Sáliva	Sáliva	Piaroa–Saliban	3,035	4,783
Emberá Dobidá	Dobidá	Chocoan	No data	4,233
Tukano	Tucano	Tucanoan	2,016	4,075
Kizgó	Kizgó	Barbacoan	No data	3,974
Quechua	Kichwa	Quechuan	481	3,688
Desano	Desano	Tucanoan	2,179	3,641
Yukpa	Yukpa	Cariban	4,761	3,610
Wanano	Wanano	Tucanoan	1,305	3,312
Ambaló	Namtrik	Barbacoan	No data	3,278
Coreguaje	Coreguaje	Tucanoan	1,767	3,257
Cocama	Kokama	Tupian	2,204	3,221
Bari	Bari	Chibchan	5,923	3,018
Guayabero	Jiw	Guahiban	617	2,960
Guna Dule	Dulegaya	Chibchan	2,383	2,610
Siona	Siona	Tucanoan	1,829	2,599
Polindara	Polindara	Barbacoan	No data	2,499
Emberá Chamí (Cañamomo Lomaprieta)	Chamí	Chocoan	21,628	2,225
Amorúa	Amorúa	Guahiban	464	2,211
Muinane	Muinane	Bora–Witoto	No data	2,113
Makuna	Makuna	Tucanoan	612	1,962
Kofán	Cofán	Cofán	1,657	1,816
Macahuán	Macahuán	Guahiban	No data	1,764
Ette Ennaka	Ette taara	Chibchan	1,614	1,701
Siriano	Siriano	Tupian	544	1,658
Yukuna	Yukuna	Arawakan	396	1,582
Tuyuca	Tuyuca	Tucanoan	444	1,467
Piaroa	Piaroa	Piaroa–Saliban	720	1,127
Piratapuyo	Wanano	Tucanoan	814	1,106
Tatuyo	Tatuyo	Tucanoan	381	1,091
Indigenous Ecuadorian (other than Otavaleño)	Kichwa	Quechuan	407	1,088
Bora	Bora	Bora–Witoto	933	1,047
Carapaná	Carapaná	Tucanoan	482	1,040
Bará	Waimajã	Tucanoan	208	1,004
Tanimuka	Tanimuka	Tucanoan	342	991
Yagua	Yagua	Peba–Yaguan	1,007	984
Achagua	Achawa	Arawakan	796	980
Yurutí	Yurutí	Tucanoan	377	969
Barasana	Barasana	Tucanoan	351	905
Cuiba	Cuiba	Guahiban	769	895
Andoke	Andoke	Bora–Witoto	136	820
Kawiyarí	Kawiyarí	Arawakan	233	809
Miraña	Miraña	Bora–Witoto	274	759
Nukak	Nukak	Puinave-Maku	1,080	744
Matapí	Yucuna	Arawakan	71	618
Dujos	Tama	Tama	56	611
Yeral (Tupi)	Nheengatu	Tupian	No data	565
Karijona	Karijona	Cariban	425	525
Masiguare	Masiguare	Guahiban	268	522
Hitnu	Hitnu	Guahiban	676	513
Ocaína	Ocaína	Bora–Witoto	285	412
Wipiwi	Cuiba	Guahiban	No data	299
Letuama	Letuama	Tucanoan	202	285
Nonuya	Nonuya	Bora–Witoto	31	258
Andaki	Andaki	Andaki	No data	248
Tariano	Tariana	Arawakan	197	210
Otavaleño	Kichwa	Quechuan	975	210
Guane	Guane	Chibchan	812	200
Pisamira	Pisamira	Tucanoan	151	196
Baniva	Karu	Arawakan	No data	187
Nutabe	Nutabe	Chibchan	No data	178
Indigenous Venezuelan	Wayuunaiki	Arawakan	8	157
Kakua	Kakua	Kakua	No data	147
Tanigua	Tanigua	Tiniguan	No data	145
Yamalero	Yamalero	Guahiban	63	142
Yaruro	Yaruro	Yaruro	No data	136
Betoye	Betoye	Betoye	394	127
Taiwano	Taiwano	Tucanoan	166	123
Yauna	Yauna	Tucanoan	99	105
Mapayerri	Mapayerri	Mapayerri	No data	104
Calima	Calima	Calima	76	102
Quimbaya	Quimbaya	Quimbaya	163	94
Tsiripu	Tsiripu	Guahiban	17	75
Mayan (Guatemalan)	Kʼicheʼ	Mayan	7	65
Guariquema	Guariquema	Guariquema	No data	62
Panche	Panche	Cariban	8	55
Makú	Cacua	Puinave-Maku	No data	50
Indigenous Peruvian	Quechua	Quechuan	98	44
Tayrona	Tayrona	Chibchan	19	43
Indigenous Brazilian	Nheengatu	Tupian	306	36
Jupda	Hup	Nadahup	No data	33
Je'eruriwa	Yucuna	Arawakan	No data	29
Makaguaje	Makaguaje	Tucanoan	125	24
Indigenous Bolivian	Aymara	Aymaran	3	22
Chiricoa	Chiricoa	Guahiban	46	19
Indigenous Panamanian	Ngäbere	Chibchan	No data	16
Guanaca	Guanaca	Guanaca	12	14
Yarí	Yarí	Yarí	No data	14
Chitarero	Chitarero	Chitarero	161	10
Indigenous Mexican	Nahuatl	Uto-Aztecan	12	5
Juhup	Hup	Nadahup	No data	4
Hupdu	Hup	Nadahup	No data	1
Yuri-Carabayo	Carabayo	Ticuna-Yuri	26	No data

== Struggle for rights ==
Indigenous people are 4.4–10% of the population of Colombia, and their level of income and the indicators of human development as education and health conditions are lower than those of the rest of Colombians. During the last 20 years, there has been a remarkable increase of the interest dedicated to the concerns of Indigenous communities all over the world. Therefore, the United Nations proclaimed the disclosure of the International Decade of the World's Indigenous People and in Latin America on 10 December 1994 and in Latin America. More than in any other region, the period was characterized by a wave of Indigenous movements that practised a growing political power from the Chiapas resistance of 1994 until the fall of the governments of Ecuador and Bolivia.

The rise of Indigenous mobilization in Colombia is explained as a reaction of crisis at various levels: a crisis of representation caused by the shortcomings of political parties with sufficient representation to shoulder all collectives' interests. a crisis of participation from the lack of citizens' participation in public affairs and a legitimation crisis from discrimination against some social groups.

During their struggle for rights, Indigenous people abandoned the armed struggle of the 1980s, and their new strategy included forms of legal liberalism, a politics of identity, and the use of transnational networks putting pressure on the state to achieve recognition and respect. That ha no't always led to success and often turned into victims of the cultural project of neoliberalism. Indigenous people's cultural accomplishments were accompanied by an escalation of the acts of persecution and the number of violations committed against them.

According to the Indigenous National Organization of Colombia (ONIC), there are 102 Indigenous peoples in Colombia, and only 82 of them are recognized by the Colombian government. One of the main problems that the Colombian Indigenous communities currently face is the lack of recognition of their right to be consulted. Poverty is another aspect that is central to understand the contemporary situation of the Indigenes of Colombia, which has been measured by using of the Unsatisfied Basic Needs (UBN), whoch conders poverty to be insufficiencies in living, services, and education.

There are differences among zones: those of greater influence of poverty measured with the UBN standard are Chocó, Sucre, Boyacá, Nariño, and Córdoba, which exceed the 50% of the population and those of less influence are found in Bogotá and the departments of El Valle, Atlántico and the coffee core: Caldas, Quindío, and Risaralda.

In 1986, the concept of pobreza absoluta was introduced in the nation during a crisis of governability and an escalation of problems concerning the armed conflict. With the politics of struggle against poverty, the state tried to consolidate its presenece in zones thatwere considered "marginal," especially those areas including Indigenous people.

Policies between 1986 and 1990 tried to rehabilitate the marginal zones and their integration to achieve development. Specific institutions were set up to work with Indigenous communities, which were seen as farmer communities whose habits and forms of production had to be modernized. As a consequence, the Indigenous minorities revolted and argued that it was not up to them to reintegrate but for the state to reform its ideas and recognize the people as the original Colombians.

The goal was to solve the crisis of governability by eliminating poverty without excluding local necessities and to encourage development from the perspective of diversity. The Indigenous communities were considered to be marginal sectors in disadvantage and highly retarded populations, which had to be incorporated and integrated in greater society. The Indigenous people were not seen as a part of the diversity of the nation whose participation was needed for its construction. That conception has survived since the colonization of the continent until now; Indigenous and black people are generally still seen as negative elements, whose diversity needs to be reduced or wiped out to guarantee Latin American societies' development and modernization.

Despite the Constitution of 1991 introducing the multiethnic and multicultural character of the Colombian nation, the contemporary relation between the state and the Indigenous communities seems to be contradictory, particularly since the communities demand autonomy. The Colombian government has always recognized the Indigenous groups only as communities since they are considered to be culturally diverse and to require therefore different political strategies to be integrated in the national society.

Different forms of participation have been assigned to the communities but always in conformity with the state's legal and constitutional regulations, as has defined and established throughout history. The 1990s were a decade of mobilization and, in some way, a victory in terms of neoliberal multiculturalism, but 20 years of the Constitution of 1991 has made people realize the need to turn to other forms of mobilization, more than legal mobilization. They have seen that the recognition of equality is not enough, and Indigenous peoples have also demanded their right to difference: access to particular rights as Indigenous communities.

Many people in Colombia choose not to identify as Indigenous because the history of discrimination against them and the immense wealth gap between those who identify as Indigenous and others. That led to only 1%, or under a million people, of Colombians in the 1993 census identifying as Indigenous. During the most recent censuses, however, more people have begun to identify as Indigenous, from 3.4% in the 2005 census to 4.31% in the 2018 census. Many scholars estimate the true Indigenous population of Colombia to be around 10% of the country's population, or 5 million people.

The same can be said for Afro-Colombians who are estimated to be around 20% of the total population, or 10 million people, despite only 6% of Colombians identifying as Afro-Colombian in the 2018 census.

Indigenous political participation, both in national and local elections, has remained low for various reasons: the fragmentation of the movement from the several groups within the Colombian Indigenous communities; the loss of the vote from non-Indigenous leaders; and the low number of voters since many who identify as Indigenous comprise a small part of the national population, with most of them living in the countryside without the possibility to vote.

== Notable Indigenous Colombians ==
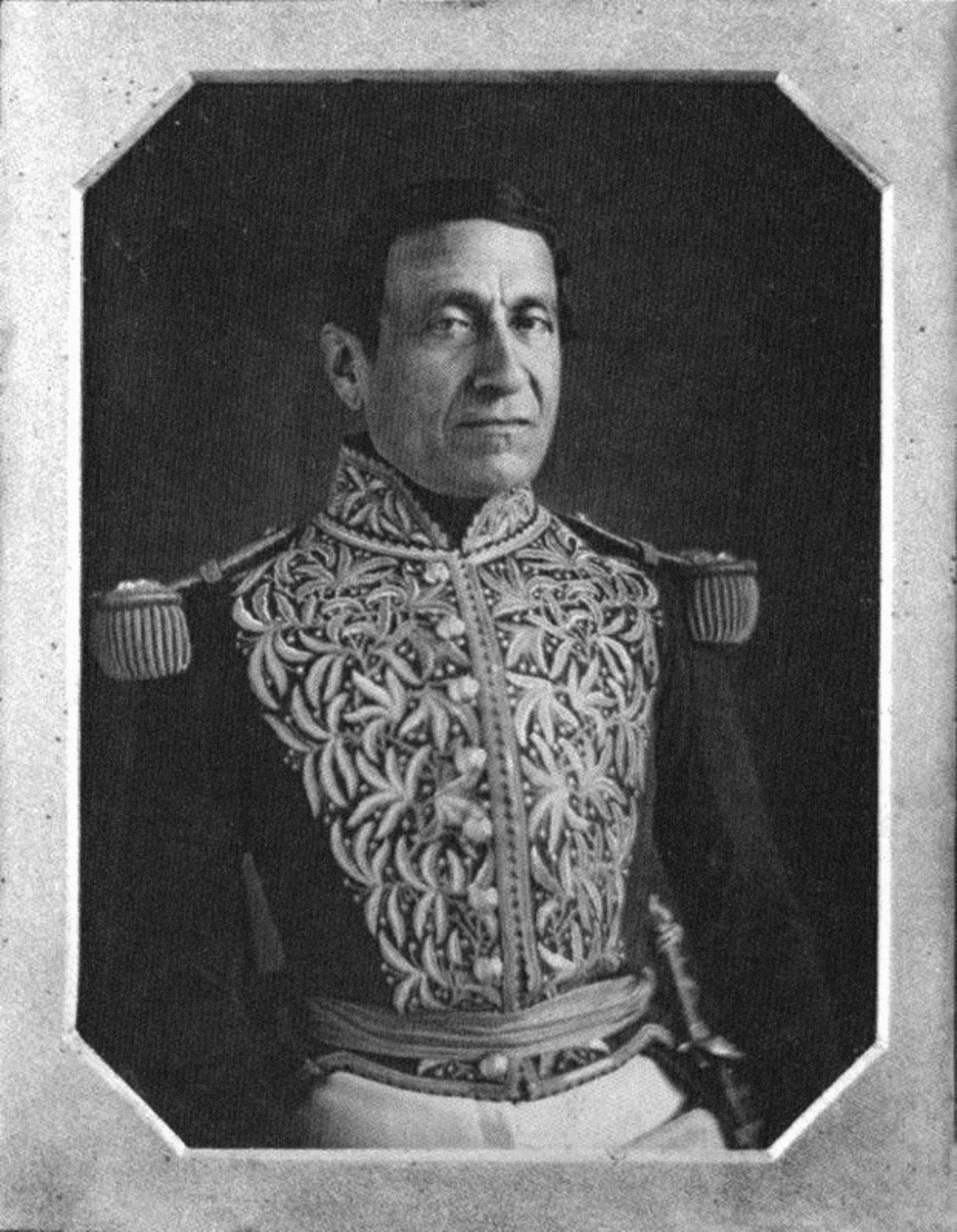
Daguerreotype of José María Melo

- Hunzahúa (c. 1470), zaque of Hunza within the Muisca Confederation.
- India Catalina (c. 1495–1538), interpreter and translator, of Mokaná descent.
- Aquiminzaque (unknown–1540), last zaque of Hunza within the Muisca Confederation.
- Agustín Agualongo (1780–1824), military commander of the Royalist forces during the Colombian War of Independence, of Pasto descent.
- José María Melo (1800–1860), 7th President of the Republic of New Granada, of Pijao descent.
- Quintín Lame (1880–1967), Indigenous rebel of Nasa origin.
- Feliciano Valencia (1955–), Senator of Colombia for Cauca, of Nasa origin.
- Lorenzo Muelas (1938–), Indigenous activist of Misak origin.
- María Clemencia Herrera Nemerayema (1968–), Indigenous Amazonian activist, of Witoto origin.
- Aida Quilcué (1973–), Senator of Colombia for Cauca, of Nasa origin.
- Lido Pimienta (1986–), Colombian-Canadian songwriter and musician, of Wayuu descent.
- Martha Peralta Epieyú (1988–), Senator of Colombia for La Guajira, of Wayuu descent.
- Luis Díaz (1997–), Colombian footballer, of Wayuu descent.

== See also ==
- Pre-Columbian cultures of Colombia
- Spanish conquest of the Muisca
- Spanish conquest of the Chibchan Nations
- Indigenous peoples of South America
- National Indigenous Organization of Colombia (ONIC)
- Colombian mythology
- Colombian folklore
- Archaeological sites in Colombia
- Race and ethnicity in Colombia
- Mestizo Colombians
- Concordat of 1928 (mostly deals with Missionary activities among Indigenous peoples)

== Bibliography ==
- Ideologia mesianico del mundo andino, Juan M. Ossio Acuña, Edicion de Ignacio Prado Pastor
