= Cabildo Mayor del Pueblo Muisca =

Colombian organisation of indigenous people

- Named after: Muisca
- Formation: September 22, 2002; 24 years ago
- Founded at: Bosa, Bogotá
- Type: Indigenous organisation
- Purpose: Education and culture Health, territory and environment Interethnic relations Linguistics
- Headquarters: Bosa, Bogotá
- Region served: Altiplano Cundiboyacense; Boyacá, Cundinamarca; Colombia
- Official language: Muysccubun, Colombian Spanish
- Parent organization: ONIC

The Cabildo Mayor del Pueblo Muisca is an organisation of indigenous people, in particular the Muisca. It was established in September 2002 in Bosa, Bogotá, Colombia. The organisation, member of National Indigenous Organization of Colombia (ONIC), focuses on defending the rights of the descendants of the Muisca, and the development of cultural and historical heritage, territory and health and the linguistics of the indigenous language, Muysccubun.

== Background ==
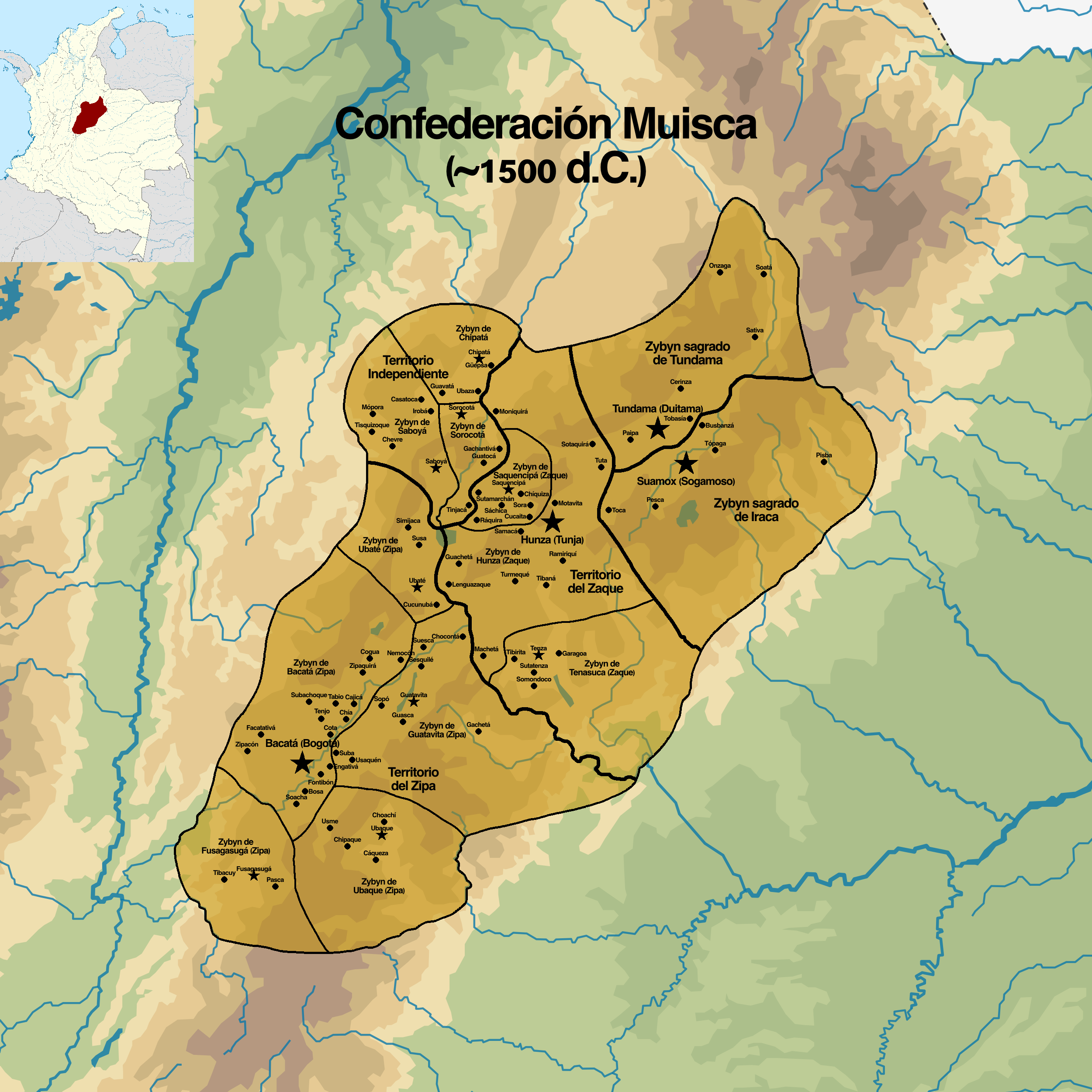
Map of the Muisca territories

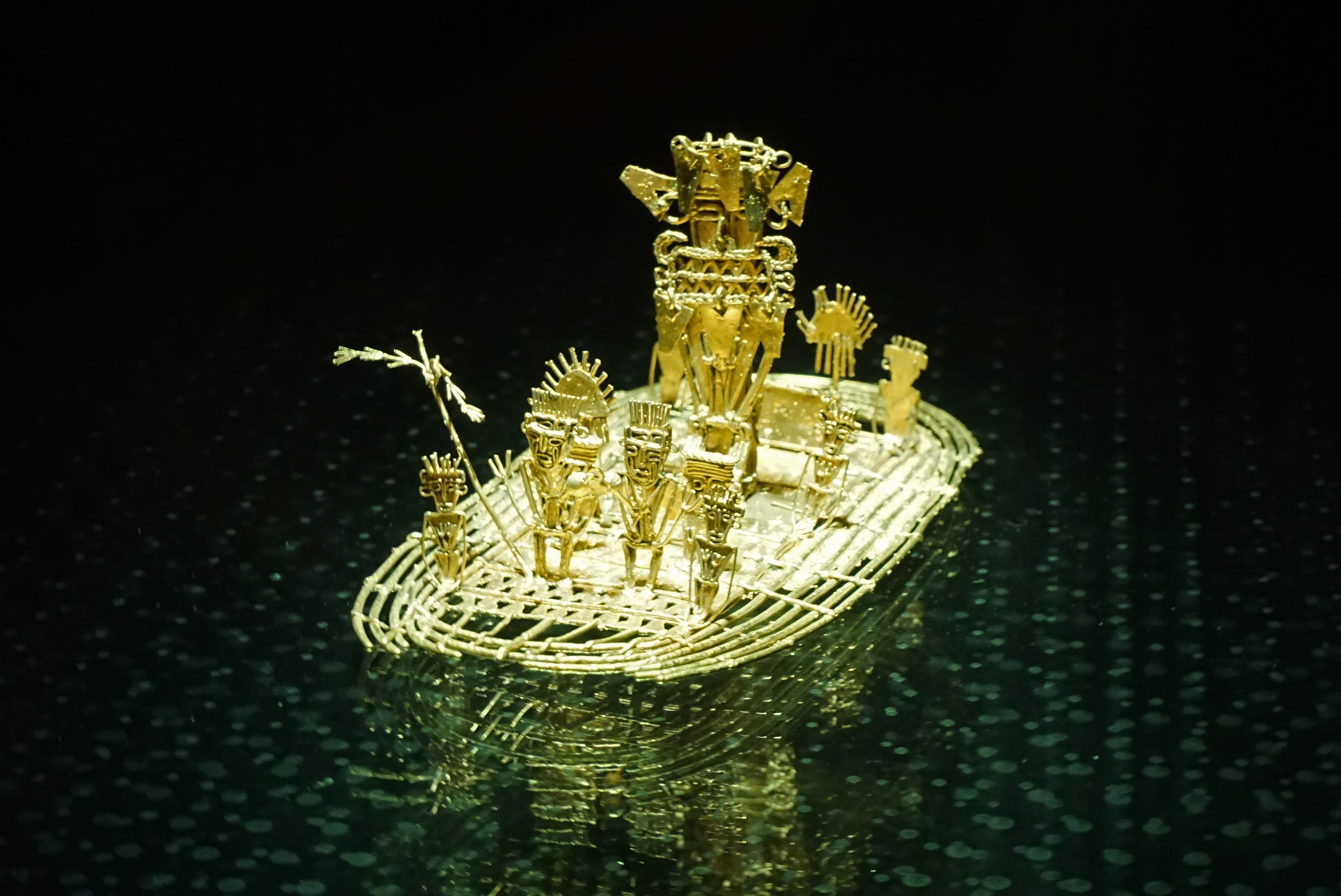
The Muisca were best known for their fine goldworking, represented in the famous Muisca raft (Gold Museum, Bogotá)

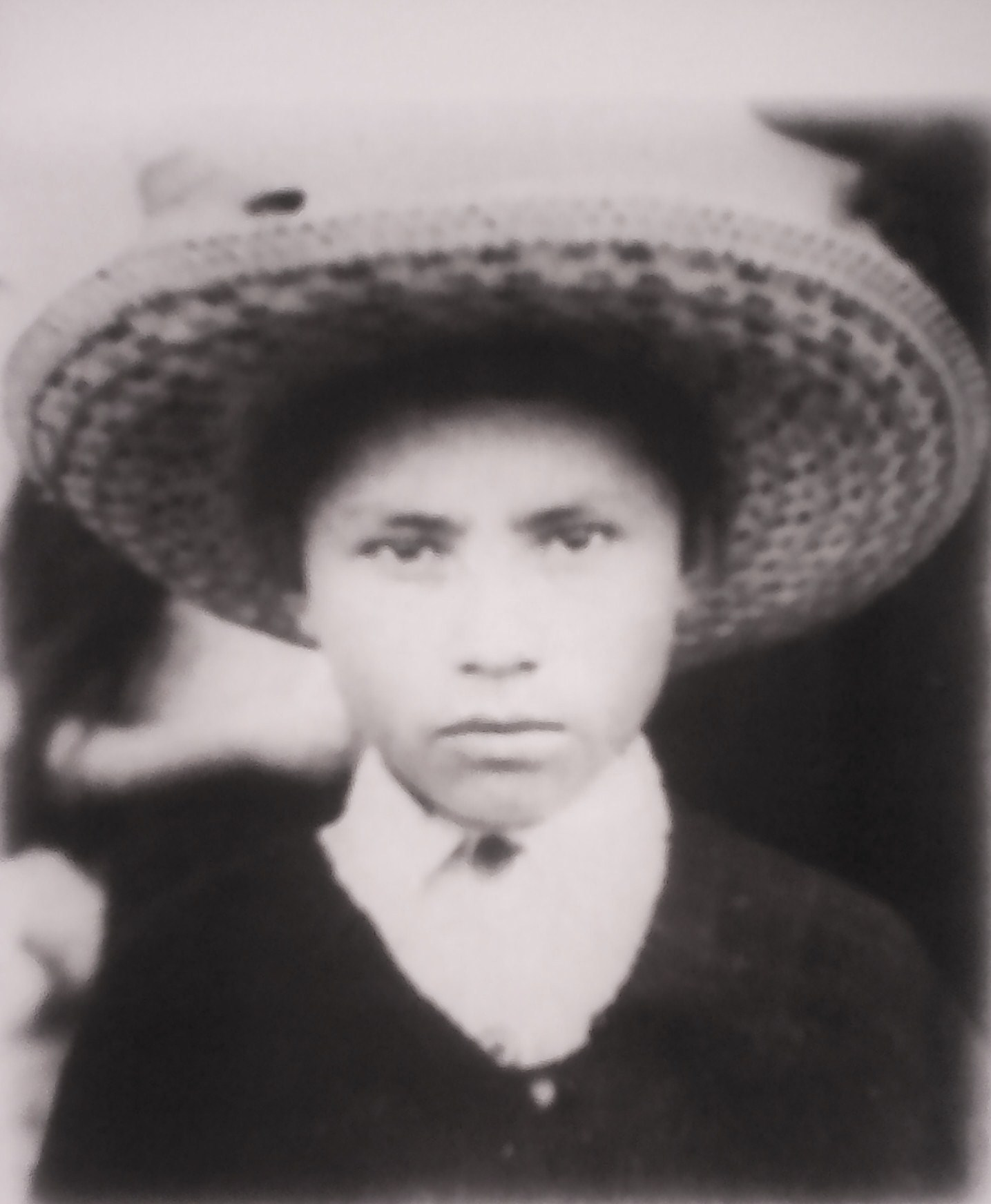
Muisca boy in 1935

The Muisca, meaning "people" or "person" in the indigenous language Muysccubun, were the indigenous inhabitants of the Altiplano Cundiboyacense, the central high plateau in the Eastern Ranges of the Colombian Andes before the Spanish conquest. Additionally, they inhabited neighbouring valleys and highlands as the Tenza Valley and Ocetá Páramo. Their major concentration was on the fertile lands of the Bogotá savanna, bordered to the east by the Eastern Hills. The name "Muisca", or "Muysca", has been given to the native people by the Spanish conquistadors who reached the Muisca territory after a harsh expedition from the Caribbean coastal city of Santa Marta in March 1537.

The diverse collection of indigenous people known as Muisca or Chibchas, due to their language being part of the Chibchan languages family, was first submitted in the south, where the zipa of Bacatá was the main leader (cacique). The zipa conquered by the Spanish was Tisquesusa, who died in Facatativá in April 1537. His successor was the last zipa, under Spanish rule in the New Kingdom of Granada, established with the foundation of Bogotá on August 6, 1538, by main conquistador Gonzalo Jiménez de Quesada. After he and two other conquistadors who reached the highlands of the Eastern Ranges, Nikolaus Federmann and Sebastián de Belalcázar left for Spain in 1539, the reign of the Spanish colony was left in the hands of the brother of De Quesada, Hernán Pérez de Quesada. Under his command, various atrocities against the indigenous people were committed, including torture and murder. The last ruler pertaining to the Muisca, Tundama, was killed by conquistador Baltasar Maldonado in December 1539 near Tundama.

During the colonial reign, the Muisca were enslaved by the Spanish and forced to pay tributes in gold, emeralds and other valuables and forced to work in the emerald, coal and salt mines present on the Altiplano. A process of evangelisation was started with the formation of the Audiencia in 1550 and the last public religious ritual of the Muisca under colonial rule took place in Ubaque in December 1563. As with other pre-Columbian civilisations in the Americas, the indigenous population dwindled because of European diseases as smallpox and typhus (65 to 85%) and the Spanish succeeded in the mestizaje of the indigenous groups; marriages between indigenous and European people. The Muisca language has been considered extinct since the late eighteenth century. Modern revival of the indigenous language is present in linguistic projects. In the early colonial period, the indigenous communities of the Bogotá savanna were subdivided into two main areas; Bosa and Bogotá. The locality of Bogotá, Suba, was inhabited by Muisca since around 800 AD and originally called Zhuba. During the expansion of the Colombian capital in the 1950s, conflicts with the indigenous peoples of Suba arose.

== Cabildo Mayor del Pueblo Muisca ==
Interview about the rights of the indigenous Muisca in and near Bogotá

Several cabildos of indigenous people were formed in Colombia in 1989. At a forum held in 1999, Los muiscas; un pueblo en reconstrucción, the Muisca communities formulated a plan for a proper organisation of their people. The indigenous communities of Bosa, and Suba in Bogotá and Cota, Chía and Sesquilé in Cundinamarca gathered between September 20 and 22, 2002 in Bosa at the first Congreso General del Pueblo Muisca where they established the Cabildo Mayor del Pueblo Muisca, as member of the National Indigenous Organization of Colombia (ONIC). Additionally, the Cabildo Mayor del Pueblo Muisca supports the indigenous communities of Ubaté, Tocancipá, Soacha, Ráquira and Tenjo.

In 2010, two kindergartens were founded for the children of the descendants of the original Muisca.

=== Activities ===
The Cabildo is active in five areas: education and culture, health, interethnic relations, territory and environment and linguistics.

== See also ==
- Spanish conquest of the Muisca
- Muisca
- Indigenous peoples of Colombia, Juan Friede
