= Kimbaya =

Kimbaya can mean:

- Quimbaya language, an extinct Colombian language
- AeroAndina MXP-150 Kimbaya, a Colombian light aircraft

== See also ==
- Quimbaya (disambiguation)
