= Matarife =

- Series logo
- Also known as: Matarife: A Bloodthirsty Butcher
- Genre: Documentary
- Created by: Daniel Mendoza Leal
- Based on: Real life story
- Starring: Daniel Mendoza Leal
- Countries of origin: Switzerland; Colombia
- Original language: Spanish
- No. of seasons: 3
- No. of episodes: 13(Episodes); 10 (Chapters) (list of episodes)

Production
- Executive producer: Cesar Andrade (director)
- Editor: Thetalentmanager.com
- Camera setup: Alejandra Cardona
- Running time: 7 minutes

Original release
- Network: Telegram; WhatsApp; YouTube
- Release: May 22, 2020

Matarifeː An Unnameable Mass Murderer, known simply as Matarife La Serie or Matarife, is a web series by the Colombian journalist, writer and lawyer Daniel Mendoza Leal. The documentary-type series narrates journalistic findings that would relate the life of Álvaro Uribe Vélez with corrupt drug traffickers, paramilitaries, and politicians in Colombia. Premiered on social networks on Friday May 22, 2020, at 7:00 pm (19:00). It was financed and produced in Australia, United States and Colombia.

The series was announced by YouTube on May 11. The trailer shows that the series is aimed at showing the work of journalist Mendoza Leal, who for years has investigated the judicial processes in which the name of Álvaro Uribe Vélez.

The series is based on investigations by the journalist and lawyer Daniel Mendoza Leal, attorney in charge of the slander case against the journalist Gonzalo Guillén, denounced by Álvaro Uribe at the end of 2017. After winning the lawsuit they decided to publish the product of their investigations. The episodes are narrated in the first person by Mendoza.

The available information, however, does not have primary sources and has been controversial because some consider it a defamation against the politician, and others as an opportunity to know with more certainty about his judicial record, about whom they have branded as a dangerous criminal. Despite this, the series has enjoyed high expectations.

== Development ==
It is known that it will be a web series of 50 chapters with five seasons, with an average duration of 6 minutes, to be distributed by Telegram, WhatsApp and other important social networks. The reason for choosing These networks were afraid that the content would be decommissioned under censorship.

The trailer shows Uribe's alleged links with drug traffickers such as Pablo Escobar and el Mexicano , paramilitaries and corruption scandals such as Odebrecht. The realization suggests that the common point of all those mentioned is Senator Uribe.

Throughout the week, the journalist Daniel Mendoza has given multiple interviews on the series, stating that he has allegedly been threatened by people related to the senator.

== Release ==
The first episode premiered via YouTube at 7:00 pm (19:00) Colombian time. The access links were available via Telegram and WhatsApp, where the entire chapter was finally posted, which was also published on the series' official channel on the video platform. It was a massive success and trend on social networks, reaching 2.5 million views on his YouTube channel in just 6 hours of the premiere of his first chapter.

== English & French subtitles versions ==
The Matarife YouTube Channel also publishes versions that include English and French subtitles.

== Awards ==
The Matarife series production was granted two India Catalina awards on March 17, 2021, during the Cartagena Film Festival for the best online production and the best documentary series.

Upon receiving the awards, Daniel Mendoza gave a short speech to thank the public and those who supported him during the production and legal struggle that followed it:

“I dedicate this triumph to the victims left by the massacres and those False Positives who were executed by the criminal corporation of mass murderer Álvaro Uribe Vélez. I thank César Andrade, the director, for his genius and professionalism, To Gónzalo, To Diana, to Marisol from La Nueva Prensa, To Juanca, my associate who led the legal defense of the series, together with Miguel Ángel Agusto and the people”

== Synopsis ==
The story begins with the attack on Club El Nogal, an event that occurred in 2003 and was attributed to the FARC.

== Episodes ==
=== Season 1 - The Unnameable Genocidal ===
Release date	Chapter	Episode Name	Episode	Duration
May 22, 2020	1	"The elite activated the bomb"	01	
May 29, 2020	2	"Death Corporation"	02	
Jun 5, 2020	3	"Sociopathic Splinters: Part I"	03	
Jun 12 2020	3	"Sociopathic Splinters: Part II"	04	
Jun 19, 2020	4	"The Cartel Gets Wings: Part I"	05	
Jun 26, 2020	4	"The Cartel Gets Wings: Part II"	06	
Jul 3, 2020	4	"The Cartel Gets Wings: Part III"	07	
Jul 10 2020	5	"Entry routes of the Mexican Mafia"	08	
Jul 17, 2020	6	"The Shadow in the Presidential Palace"	09	
Jul 25, 2020	7	"The Origins of the Monster"	10	
Jul 31, 2020	8	"Laundering and Billing"	11	
Aug 7, 2020	9	"The Patron's Patron"	12	
Aug 7, 2020	10	"Hatred makes the Monster"	13	

=== Season 2 - The Slaughter Lord ===
The second season had production problems because, according to his creator, the right-wing Colombian government led by Iván Duque sought to censor the series in Colombia through lawsuits; As a consequence, Daniel Mendoza decided to move to Europe and broadcast the series from France to avoid any type of censorship under the Colombian jurisdiction. The second season was broadcast on July 20, 2021.

Date of issue	episode name	Chapter	Episode	urls
19-Apr-22	The Origin (Chapter 1)	1	1	
19-Apr-22	The Origin (Chapter 2)	2	2	
28-Apr-22	The Origin (Chapter 3)	3	3	
5-May-22	The Origin (Chapter 4)	4	4	
12-May-22	The Other Yodas		5	
23-May-22	FICO Aliases (Part 1)	5	6	
28-May-22	FICO Aliases (Part 2)		7	
5-Jun-22	Alias El Engineer (Part 1)	6	8	
Earring	Alias El Engineer (Part 2)		9	

=== Season 3 - The Origin ===
Date of issue	episode name	Chapter	Episode	urls
20-Jul-21	The beginning	1	1	
6-Aug-21	the truth of the lies	2	2	
6-Aug-21	A distracted assassin	3	3	
13-Aug-21	soul of big mac	4	4	
20-Aug-21	good dead	5	5	
27-Aug-21	sociopath	6	6	
3-Sep-21	The company	7	7	
10-Sep-21	The Lawyers	8	8	
1-Oct-21	Double zero	9	9	
