= Zenú =

Indigenous people in Colombia

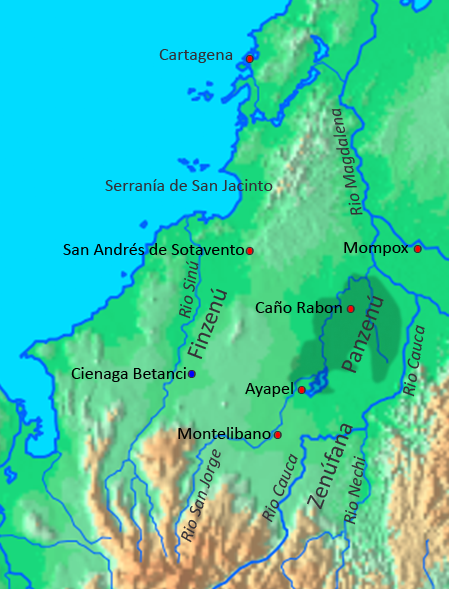
- Caribbean area where the Zenú culture developed between 200 BCE and 1600 CE. The dark green area is the inland delta where most of the Zenú irrigation and drainage works were constructed.

Total population
- 307,091 (2018)

Regions with significant populations
- Colombia (Córdoba and Sucre departments)

Languages
- Sinúfana language

The Zenú, Sinú or Cenú is a pre-Columbian culture and Indigenous people in Colombia, whose ancestral territory comprises the valleys of the Sinú and San Jorge rivers as well as the coast of the Caribbean around the Gulf of Morrosquillo. These lands lie within the departments of Córdoba and Sucre.

The Zenú civilization peaked from about 200 BCE to about 1600 CE, constructing major waterworks and producing gold ornaments. The gold that was often buried with their dead lured the Spanish conquistadors, who looted much of the gold. With the arrival of the Spaniards, the chiefdom was decimated over a 25-year period (1510–1535) by disease and warfare. The Zenú language disappeared around 200 years ago. However, the 2018 Colombian Census showed 307,091 Zenú people in Colombia.

In 1773 the King of Spain designated 83,000 hectares in San Andrés de Sotavento as a Zenú reserve. This reserve existed until it was dissolved by the National Assembly of Colombia in 1905. The Zenú have fought for the restoration of the reserve, and in 1990 San Andrés de Sotavento was restored as a Zenú reserve with a land area of 10,000 hectares (later 23,000). Since then, and especially in the first decades of the 21st century, more and more lands in Antioquia Department have been transferred to Zenú people.

== Pre-Columbian period ==
Around 200 BCE, communities of farmers and goldsmiths lived in the valleys of the Sinú, San Jorge, Cauca and lower Nechí rivers, all culturally related with similar artistic expressions, concepts of life and death, and environmental practices. Their means of subsistence were hunting, farming, fishing, and trading in raw materials and finished products. Around 950 CE, about 160 inhabitants per square kilometer lived in the San Jorge basin. After 1100, the Zenú population decreased for unknown reasons and moved to higher pastures that did not flood, requiring no drainage works, where they lived until the Spanish conquest.

=== Waterworks ===
The inland delta formed by the San Jorge River, the Cauca River, the Magdalena River and the Nechí River, south-west of Santa Cruz de Mompox, frequently flooded during the rainy season in the mountains from April to November, causing great inconvenience to the residents of the plains. Therefore, from 200 BCE onwards these people built a system of channels that enabled them to control the flooding and make large areas practical for habitation and agriculture. The system was continually expanded. Covering 500,000 hectares between 200 BCE and 1000 CE, it was at its greatest extent in the San Jorge basin, but channels were also constructed in the lower reaches of the rivers Cauca and Sinú.

The Zenú dug channels, sometimes as long as four kilometers, connected to the natural waterways. Perpendicular to these channels, smaller irrigation ditches were dug. The soil left by the excavations was used to build long artificial terraces, two to four meters high, on which they built their houses. During times of high water, the channels led the water to areas where crops were grown. When the water withdrew, the nutrient-rich sludge was used to enrich the land. This system of water management was used over a period of 1300 years.

After the Spanish conquest, the drainage system probably did not function anymore, because the chroniclers made no mention of it. Although the system has now been overtaken by marshes, the channel patterns are still detectable in the landscape.

=== Symbol of fertility ===
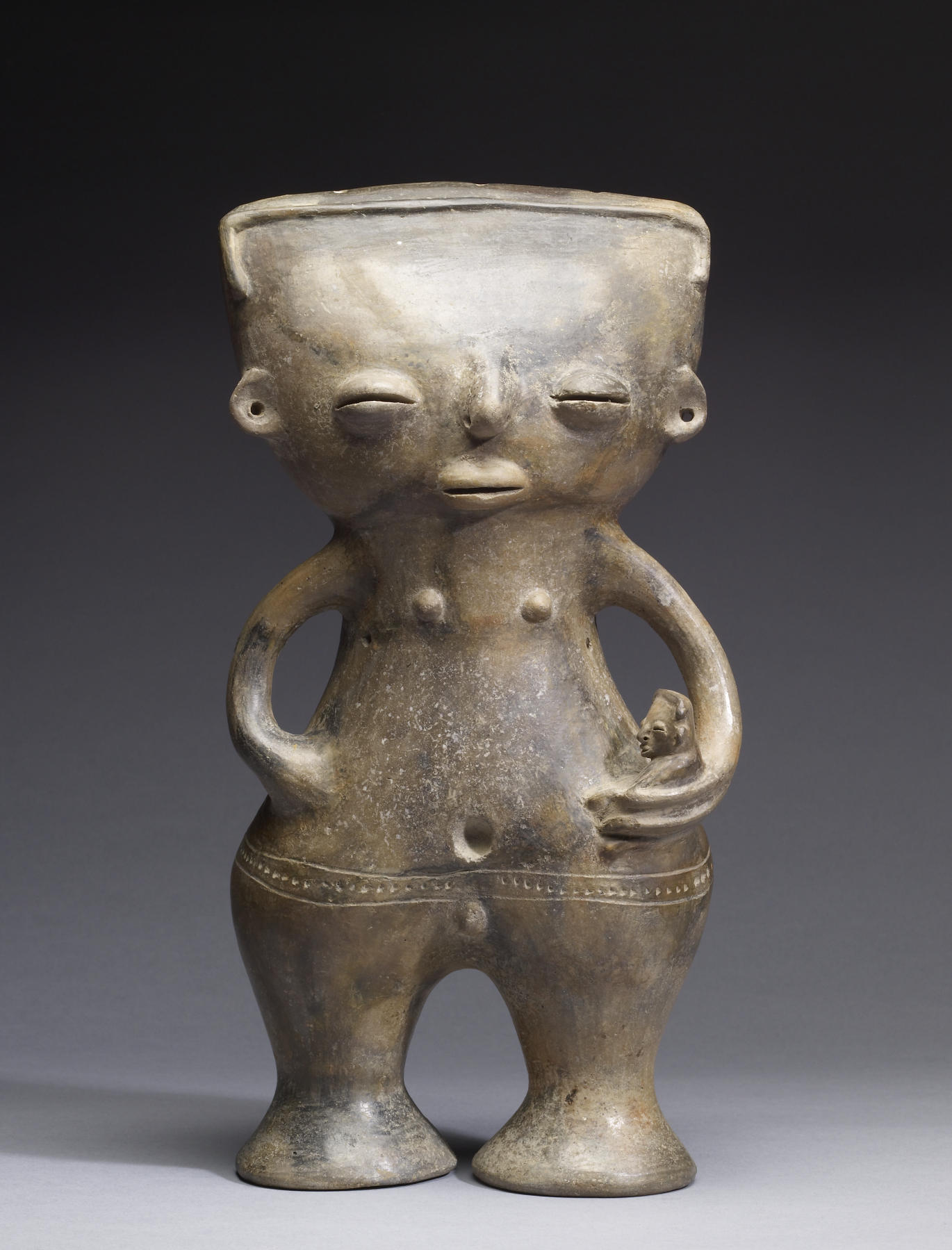
Sinú, Standing Figure of a Mother and Child - Walters Art Museum.

In the Zenú culture, women were the symbol of fertility, wisdom and respect. Female characters were frequently portrayed in clay and placed in the graves of the dead as a symbol of human and agricultural fertility. The presence of these statuettes in the grave symbolized conception and rebirth in the underworld, in the same way that seeds germinate and grow. During the funeral ceremony, which was attended by the whole community with music and dance, a mound was built over the grave. On top of the mound a tree was planted, and golden bells were hung in the branches. The golden breastplates that important women and chiefs wore during ceremonies symbolized the pregnancy of women and the virility of men. The roundness of the mound, like the roundness of a breastplate, was an allusion to the place where pregnancy and birth took place. Thus, women possessed great social and political significance. When the Zenú culture was discovered by the Spaniards in the 16th century, the religious center of Finzenú at the river Sinú was led by Toto, a female chief who governed several nearby villages.

=== Gold ornaments ===
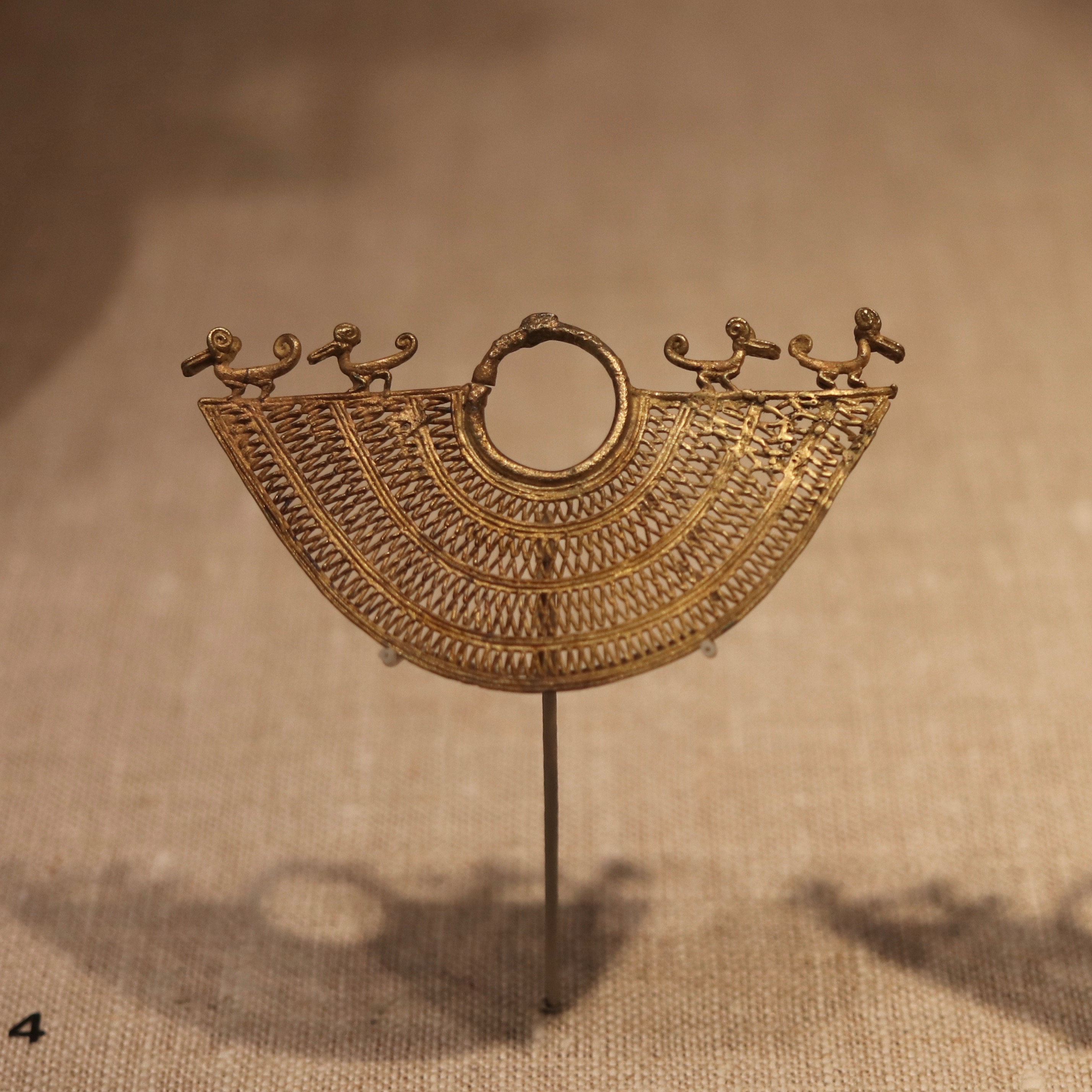
Zenú lost wax cast gold earring, AD 800 - San Antonio Museum of Art

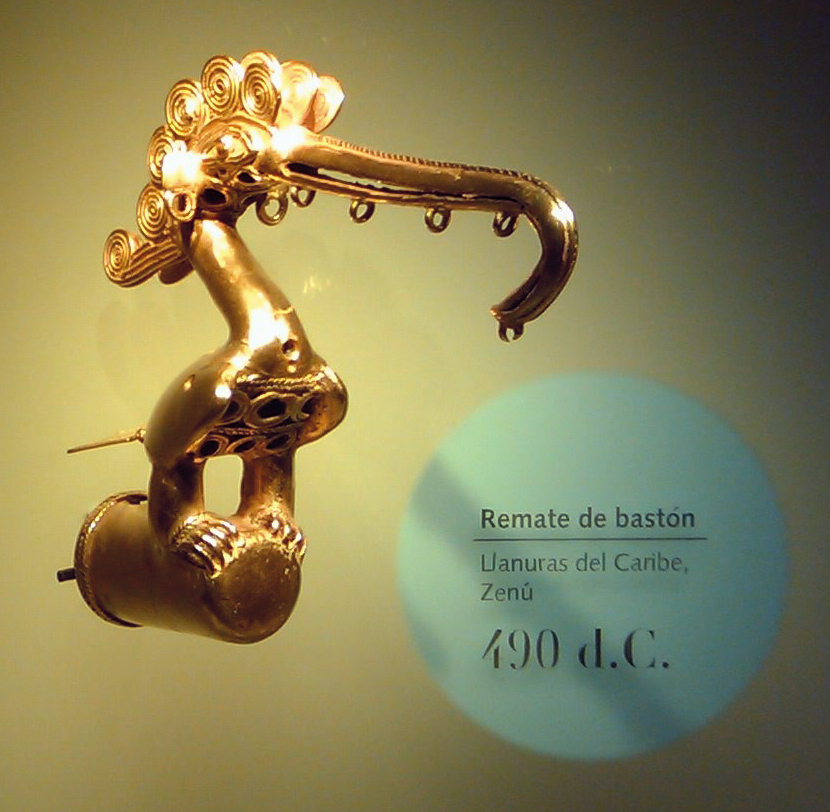
Lowland Zenú cast-gold bird ornament that served as a staff head, dated 490 CE. This culture used alloys with a high gold content. The crest of the bird exemplifies the cast semi-filigree technique - Gold Museum, Bogota

The web of canals was reflected in their art, culture, and symbolic thinking. For the Zenú, the world seemed to be a large wicker-work, on which living beings were placed. This symbolism is reflected in the patterns of fishing nets, textiles, pottery and goldwork. As the web of channels was the place where daily life took place, so also did people and animals appear in the metallic fabric of cast semi-filigree earrings.

Semi-filigree, which was not woven with gold thread but cast using the lost wax method, was the characteristic feature of the decoration of Zenú goldwork. Next to casting, gold was also hammered into plates and reliefs. Gold ornaments typically were made of an alloy with a high degree of gold. Waterfowl, alligators, fish, cat, and deer figures were sources of food as well as elements of their culture. The animal world was depicted in gold pendants and in gold ornaments to be placed on the head of a staff.

=== Textiles and wickerwork ===
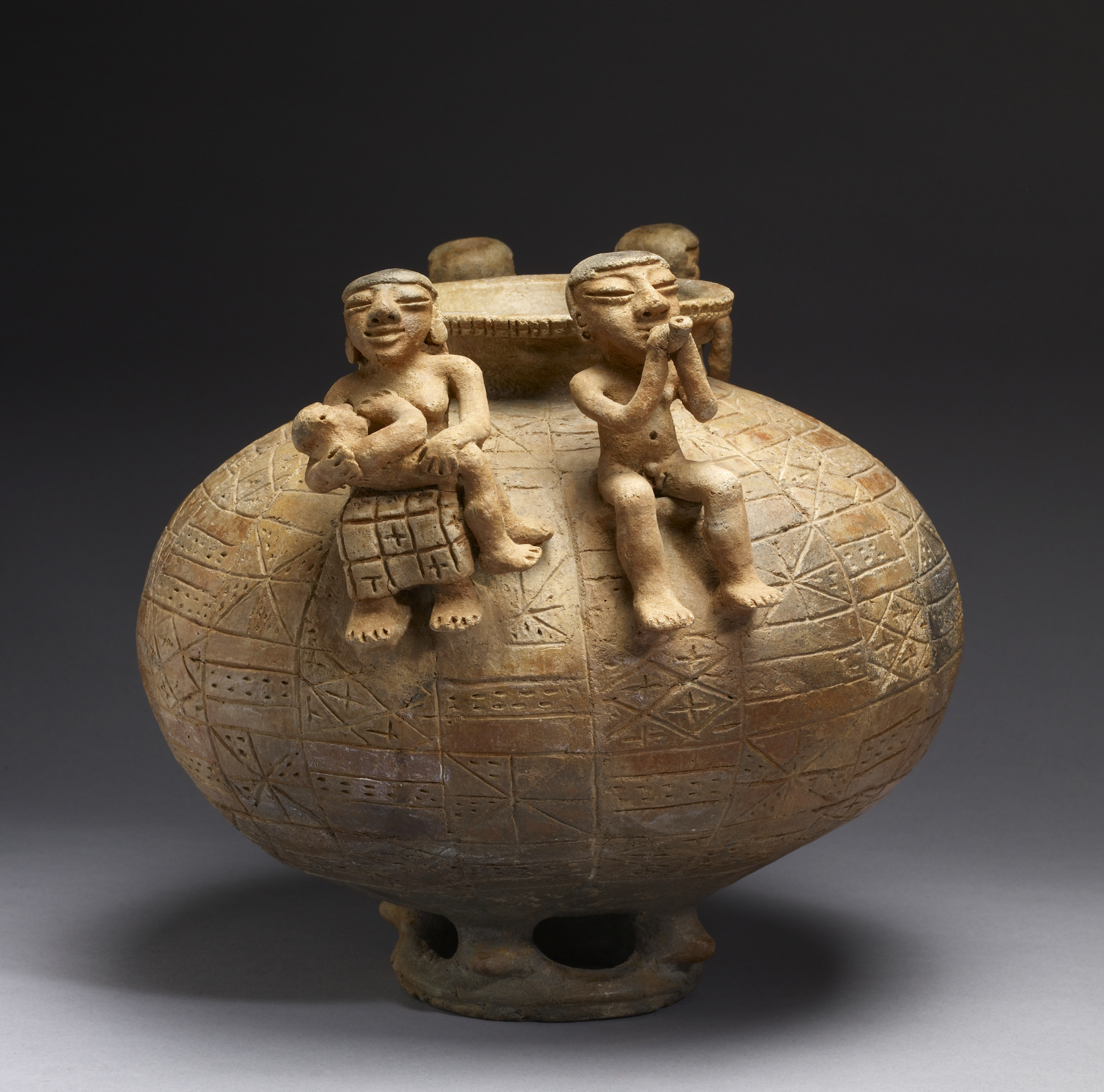
A jar with reproductions of wickerwork and textiles - Walters Art Museum

Pre-Columbian textiles and wickerwork of the Zenú are almost completely lost, but the tools they used for producing these items, such as needles and spindles made of bone, shells, and ceramics, did survive. The development of woven fabrics can be traced from numerous representations in gold and ceramic objects. Women were portrayed with long woven skirts with a variety of patterns.

=== Zenú identity ===
The themes expressed in gold or ceramics show that the various ancient communities in the areas were politically and religiously related. The designs on textiles and clay baskets, the female clay figurines, and the construction of the burial mounds were similar for all the people of these river valleys. Like the channel system, which remained in use for many centuries, these cultural features lasted a long time and are part of what is called the Zenú tradition. Artisans from different localities in the area, however, expressed these ideas in their own way, making it possible to distinguish between them. Nevertheless, they showed a common Zenú identity.

=== Contact with Polynesians ===
A 2020 genetic study found strong evidence of contact between Polynesians and a Native American group most closely related to present day Zenú people dated to approximately 1200CE, before the settlement of Rapa Nui (Easter Island). The authors propose two explanations for the contact event: Native American settlement of an Eastern Pacific island followed by contact with Polynesians, or Polynesian arrival to present day Colombia followed by a return to an Eastern Pacific island. In either case, a contact event between Native Americans and Polynesians may explain the human-mediated spread of sweet potatoes (native to the Americas) throughout Polynesia. A further linguistic study corroborates this connection identifying possible loan words.

== After the Spanish conquest ==
=== Zenúes of the river valleys ===
From 1100 onwards, the Zenú population declined for unknown reasons, and until the Spanish conquest the Zenú lived on higher pastures around Ayapel, Montelibano, and Betanci. On their plunder raids, the Spaniards discovered the area by traveling via the Sinú River.

Under the Zenú, each valley made up its own province. The Sinú valley was called Finzenú, with its capital, Zenú. At the time of the Spanish conquest, Finzenú was governed by a woman, Toto. Their most important holy place and the cemetery where dignitaries were buried was at Zenú, near the marsh Betanci. The San Jorge basin where food was grown was called Panzenú, governed by Yapel, with its main political center in Ayapel. Zenúfana, governed by Nutibara, between the rivers Cauca and Nechí, was the primary place where gold was produced.

According to the Zenú, Chief Zenúfana, a mythical figure, had governed the lower Cauca and Nechí area. During the Spanish conquest, he was regarded as the foremost of the ancient chiefs because he organized the whole territory of Great Zenú and assigned political, economic and religious duties to the chiefs of Finzenú and Panzenú, who were his relatives. He had enacted laws and regulations that were still in force when Pedro de Heredia invaded the country. The three chiefs had complementary political, religious and economic duties.

=== Zenúes in the mountains of San Jacinto ===
Related groups of Zenú goldsmiths, merchants, and sailors lived around the time of the Spanish conquest in the mountains of San Jacinto and on the banks of the Magdalena River. They distinguished themselves, however, from the lowland Zenúes who used cemeteries and burial mounds, by burying their dead in large pots which were placed under the floors of their homes.

Unlike the goldsmiths in the river valleys, these goldsmiths used gold alloys which contained a relatively large amount of copper. These were objects for mass use. To give the surface of these objects a golden appearance, they were subjected to a chemical heating process. This dissolved the copper at the surface while the gold stayed behind. The gilding is often worn away in the course of time, revealing oxidized copper.

These items are similar to those of the lowland culture: fine cast circular and semi-circular filigree earrings, nose rings with horizontal extensions, pendants adorned with richly attired people, circular or n-shaped nose rings, staff heads, bells, and amphibious people with headdresses. Some designs are realistic, others stylized. People are naturalistically portrayed: people holding gourds, musicians with flutes and maracas, people sitting on chairs with a high back, or standing.

Wildlife from the rugged mountains are often portrayed on these items, but animals from the marsh and river areas are also depicted. A typical feature of the objects produced in the mountains of San Jacinto is the representation of scenes, such as ducks sitting on a branch, a feline figure fighting with an alligator, or a man holding the claws of a bird of prey. Birds, feline and amphibious figures are the animals that are associated with men.

Men and animals, in general, retain their own characteristics, like beautifully attired dignitaries with very stylized bodies, but images have also been found with anthropomorphic portrayals of various beings. These depict a human face and a headdress resembling a bird's crest, with the body of an animal from a swampy area, like a fish, a lizard, or a crustacean.

Some characteristics of their goldwork were unique to these mountain people, but their work is closely related to that of the Zenúes from the rivers. Since many items come from the mountains of San Jacinto, it may have been an important production center. It is unknown when the production of goldwork started in this area, but given the similarity of themes and techniques with those of the goldwork found in river valleys that was already being produced by 200 BCE, it could have started a long time ago. Carbon dating has shown that the production of San Jacinto certainly continued until after the Spanish conquest.
