= Quimbaya (disambiguation) =

Quimbaya is a Pre-Columbian term. It may mean:

- The Quimbaya civilization of western Colombia
- Quimbaya, Quindío, a municipality in the department of Quindío in Colombia
- Quimbaya language, a putative extinct language
