= India Catalina =

Indigenous Colombian translator and intermediary

Catalina
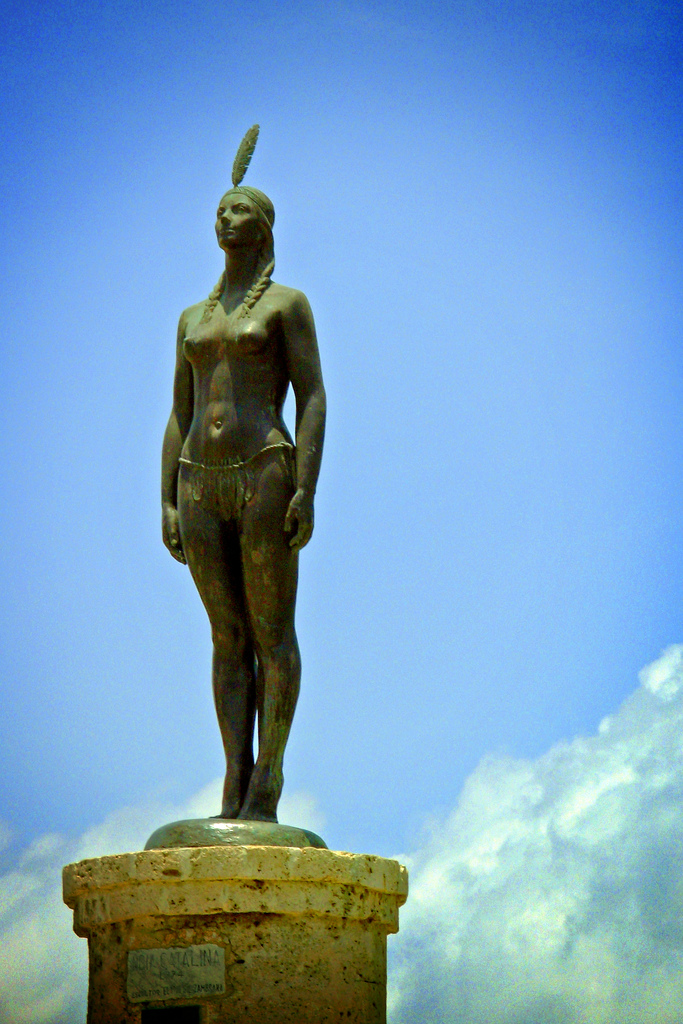
- Statue of India Catalina in Cartagena de Indias
- Born: 1495
- Died: 11 May 1538 (aged 42–43)
- Occupations: Translator, interpreter
- Known for: Translator for Pedro de Heredia during the Spanish conquest of New Granada
- Spouse: Alonso Montañez

India Catalina (1495 – May 11, 1538) was an Indigenous child of Mokaná ethnicity from the Colombian Atlantic coast, who was kidnapped by Pedro de Heredia to be an interpreter and intermediary, playing a role in the Spanish conquest of Colombia.

== History ==
Catalina, the daughter of a local chief, was abducted in 1509 by Spanish conquistador Diego de Nicuesa from an Indigenous settlement known as Zamba o Galerazamba in the department of Bolívar. She was sent to Santo Domingo, where she learned the Spanish language and adopted the Catholic Christian faith, although she was still considered a slave. She served as an interpreter to the Native Americans under Pedro de Heredia during his conquest of Colombia. She was also his concubine for many years, but after she took him to court for stealing gold, it is possible that Pedro had her married to his nephew Alonso Montañez.

Due to the strategic positioning of the city for both military and trade purposes, control of the indigenous population was critical to advancing Spain's colonial rule. Catalina's translations were vital to this process and eventually to converting the indigenous populations to Catholicism.

The name "India (the Indian) Catalina (Spanish version of Katherine, inspired by Saint Katherine of Alexandria)" appeared in a letter sent for Pedro de Heredia to King Carlos V in 1533. Her Indigenous name was never mentioned in the documents.

According to the Colombian drama series "La reina de Indias y el conquistador" (The Queen and the Conqueror), her Indigenous names are Katalydeyewua and Kaitegua.

== Monument ==
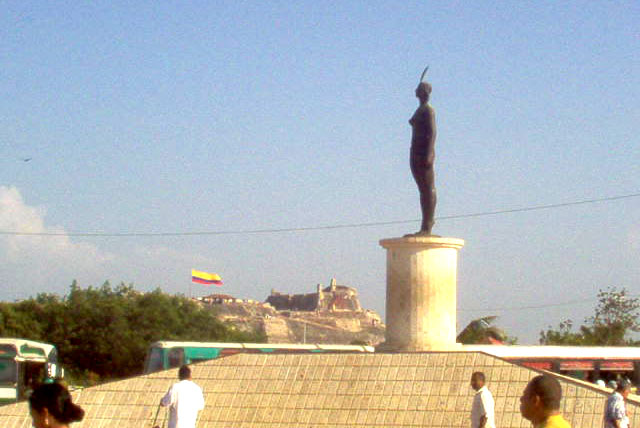
The monument is located in the historic center of Cartagena. St Felipe castle in the background

A monument to India Catalina was sculpted by Eladio Gil Zambrana and presented to the public in 1974. It stands in Cartagena de Indias (known precolonially as Cartagena). Small scale replicas are used in the Cartagena Film Festival awards.

== See also ==
- La Malinche
- Sacagawea
- Pocahontas
