= Pedro de Heredia =

Spanish conquistador (1484–1554)

Adelantado Pedro de Heredia y Fernández
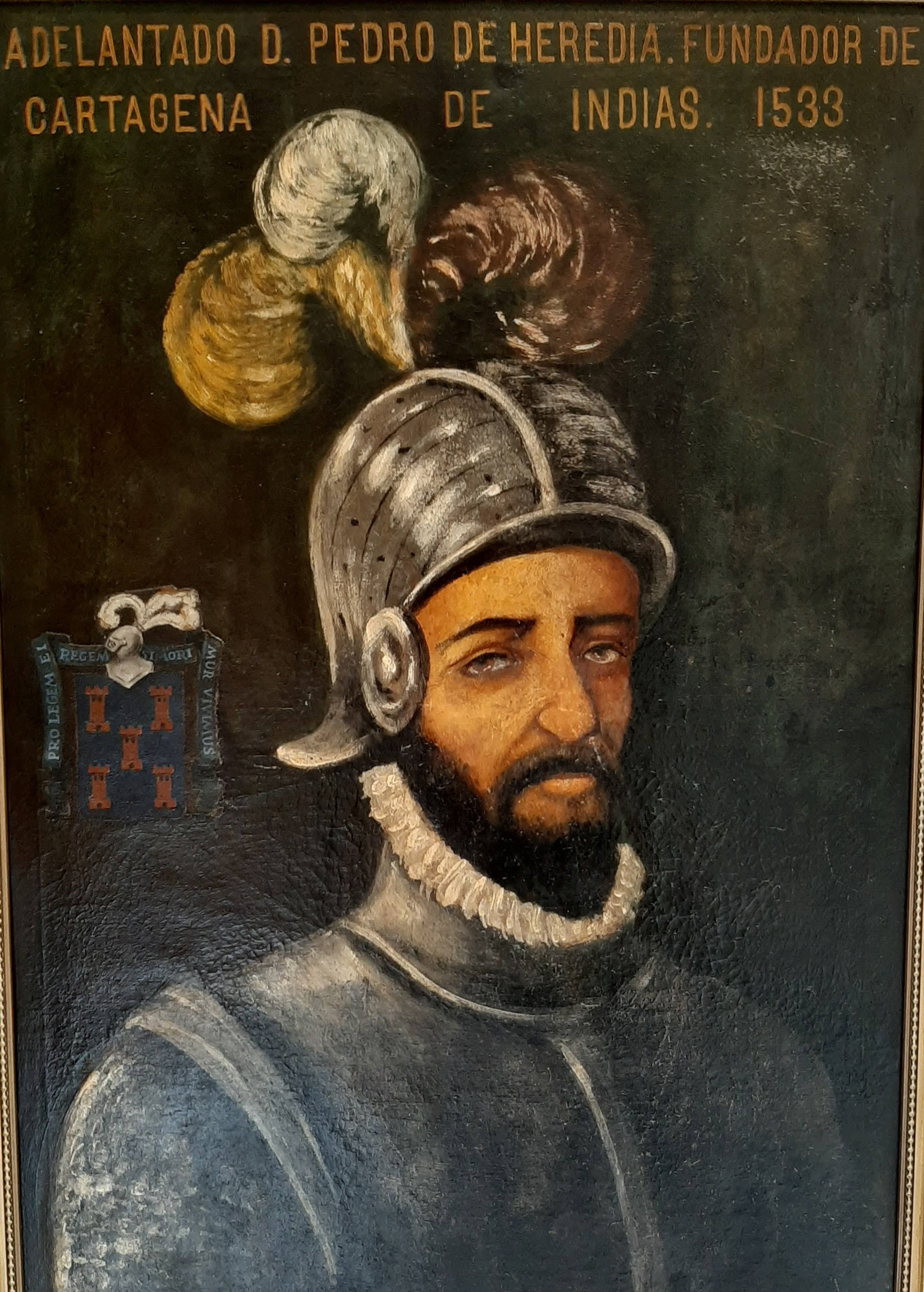
- Pedro de Heredia according to a painting at the Palace of Inquisition in Cartagena, Colombia
- Born: c. 1484; Madrid, Spain
- Died: 27 January 1554; Zahara de los Atunes, Cádiz, Spain
- Occupations: Explorer, Conqueror

Pedro de Heredia (c. 1484 – 27 January 1554) was a Spanish conquistador, founder of the city of Cartagena de Indias and explorer of the northern coast and the interior of present-day Colombia.

== Early life ==
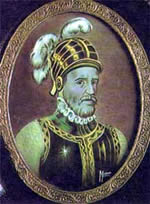
Portrait of Conquistador Pedro de Heredia. Luis Ángel Arango Library, Bogotá.

Pedro de Heredia was born in c. 1484 in Madrid. He was a descendant of a rich family of noble lineage. His parents were Pedro de Heredia and Inés Fernandez. The chronicler Juan de Castellanos tells that even in his early years, he showed an adventurous and quarrelsome character. In his youth, Pedro de Heredia was involved in an altercation with six men who tried to kill him in a dark alley in Madrid. The fight left him with a disfigured nose that required the intervention of a doctor from the Spanish Crown. In retaliation, Heredia hunted down three of his attackers and killed them before fleeing to the New World to evade justice, leaving behind his wife and children.

== First travel to the New World ==
Heredia traveled to the West Indies with his brother Alonso de Heredia and settled in Santo Domingo, the capital of the island of Hispaniola, where they eventually inherited a sugar mill and an estate in Azua Province. Then came news of the death of the governor of Santa Marta, Rodrigo de Bastidas, and the Royal Audiencia of Santo Domingo decided to send Pedro de Vadillo as interim governor of the province and Pedro de Heredia as his lieutenant. In 1528, Vadillo and Heredia landed in Santa Marta with 200 men and soon became involved in disputes with Rodrigo Alvarez Palomino, a former lieutenant of Bastidas, which were resolved when the latter was drowned in the river that bears his name.

Vadillo served as interim governor of Santa Marta but returned to Santo Domingo to face a residencia (an administrative and judicial tribunal). In the meantime, Heredia continued in office until 1529, gaining extensive experience in his dealings with the Indians. He accumulated a considerable booty from exchanges of mirrors, bells and other trinkets with the natives, then returned to Santo Domingo and sailed back to Spain.

== First expedition to the New World ==
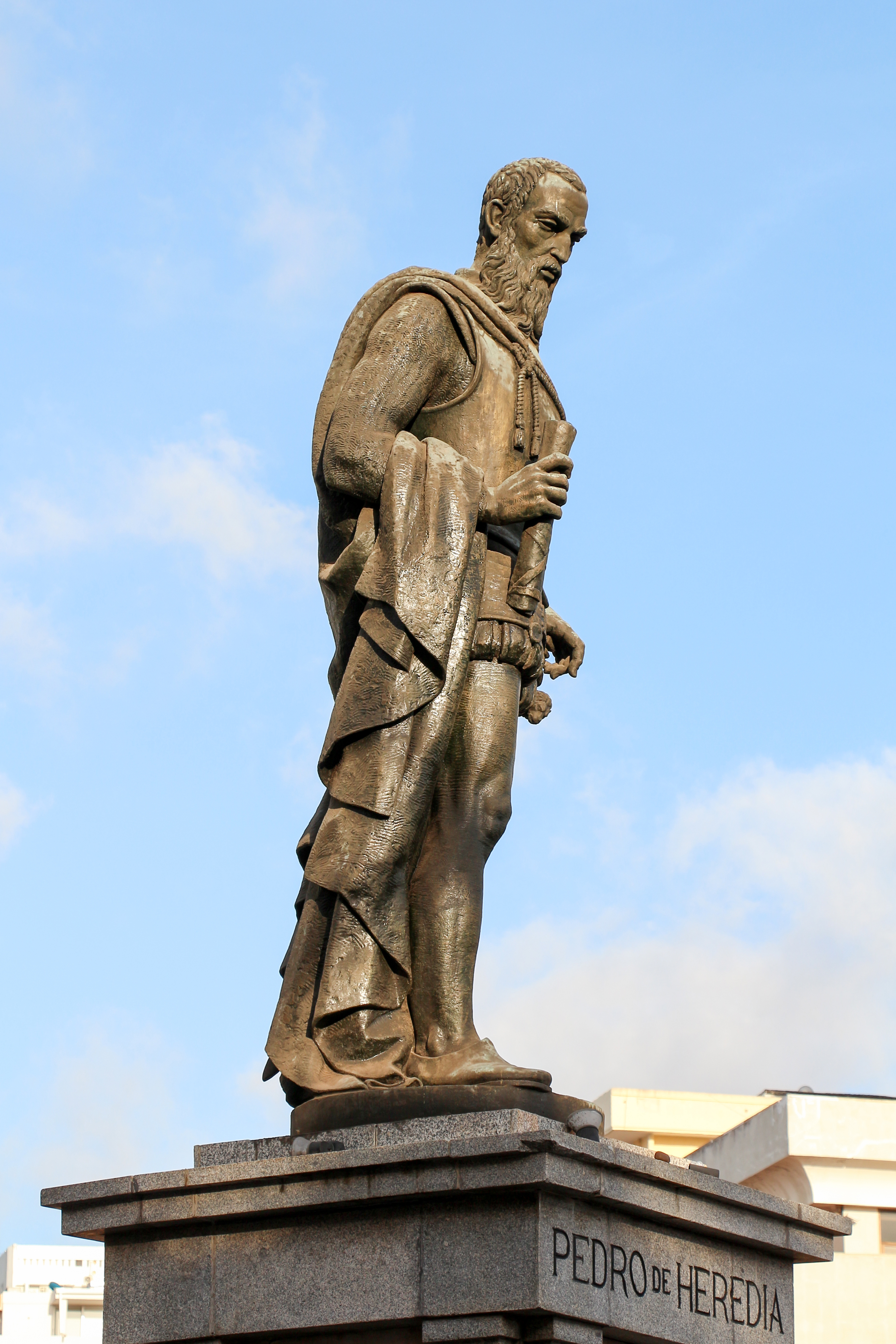
Statue of Pedro de Heredia in Cartagena

Once in Madrid, Heredia initiated efforts to gain royal approval to secure the conquest and government of the Bay of Cartagena and New Andalucía, a territory that stretched from the mouth of the Magdalena River to Darién Province, which had belonged to Alonso de Ojeda. The capitulación, or agreement, granting him the title of adelantado, was signed in Medina del Campo on August 5, 1532, by queen Joanna of Castile (also known as Joanna the Mad). Heredia was granted an area covering virtually all of what is now Colombia and more than half of present-day Ecuador, stretching inland to the equator. Heredia moved to Sevilla, where he procured a galleon, a caravel and a patache and embarked from Cádiz with 150 men and 22 horses in November, 1532.

Heredia first landed in Puerto Rico, where he found the survivors of an expedition led by Sebastian Cabot, who was on his way back from the Rio de La Plata after six difficult and unsuccessful years spent in the New World. Heredia augmented his army with some of Cabot's officers, including Francisco César, whom he appointed as his lieutenant. He then departed for Santo Domingo, where he visited his estates and drafted some Indians and slaves, a few Spanish women and an interpreter, India Catalina, a native woman fluent in both the Spanish and Indian tongues who had been kidnapped by Diego de Nicuesa when she was a girl.

== Foundation of Cartagena de Indias ==
After spending Christmas Day in Santo Domingo, Heredia sailed across the Caribbean Sea to the mainland of South America where he cruised off the coast into Santa Marta Bay and then past the mouth of the Magdalena River. He passed several villages of the Mokaná Indians, until on January 14, 1533 he reached Calamari, the largest of them, standing on the sandy inner shore of Cartagena Bay. After fierce combat with the natives of the territory of Turbaco, Heredia founded a city, now Cartagena de Indias, naming it after Cartagena, Spain because it had a similar bay, but he called it "Cartagena de Poniente" to distinguish it from that city. The exact date of the founding of Cartagena de Indias remains a topic of controversy. Some argue that it was on January 20 or 21 in 1533, although the Colombian Academy of History has fixed the date as June 1, 1533.

== Inland expeditions and residencias ==
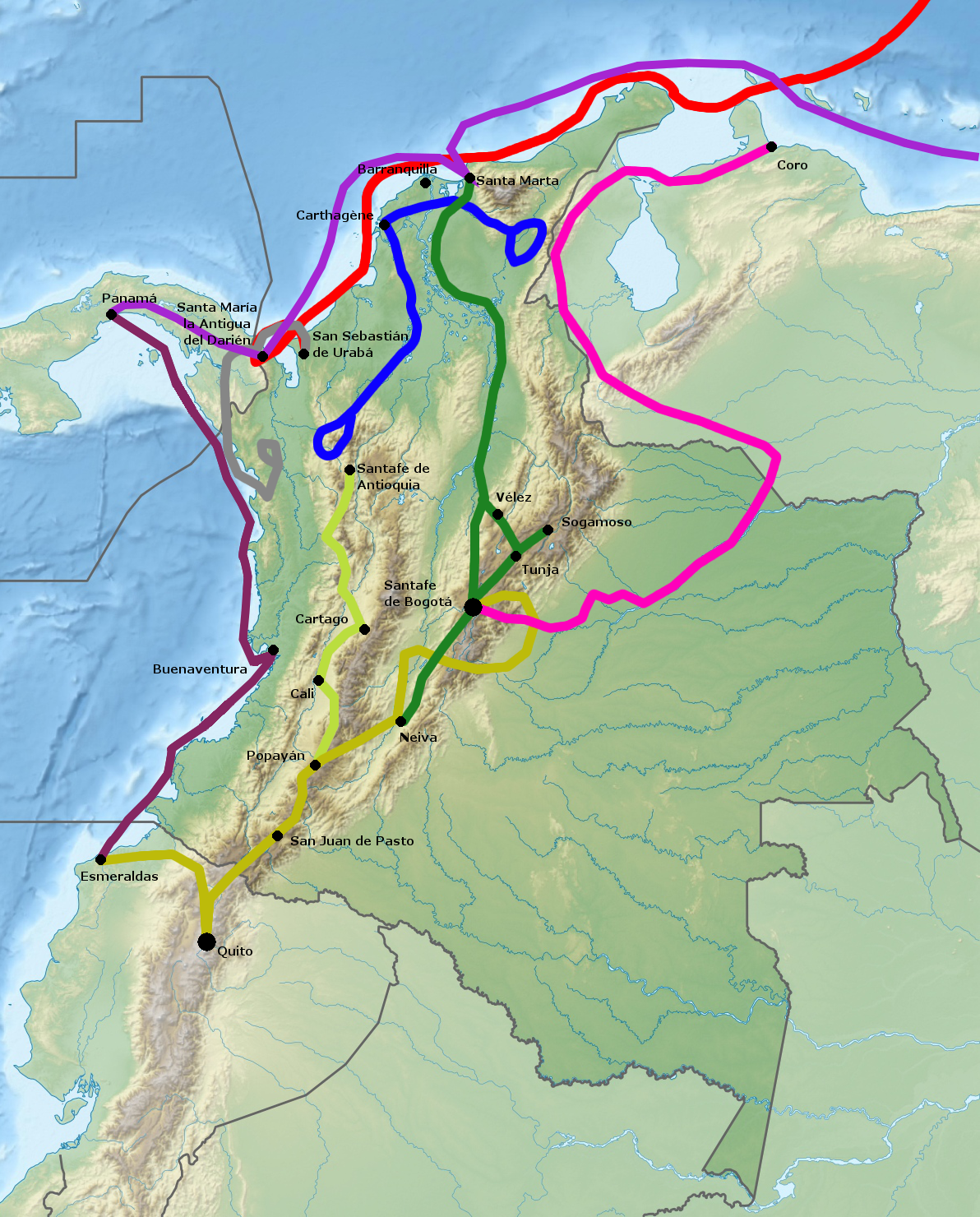
Map of Colombian conquest; De Heredia's route indicated in blue

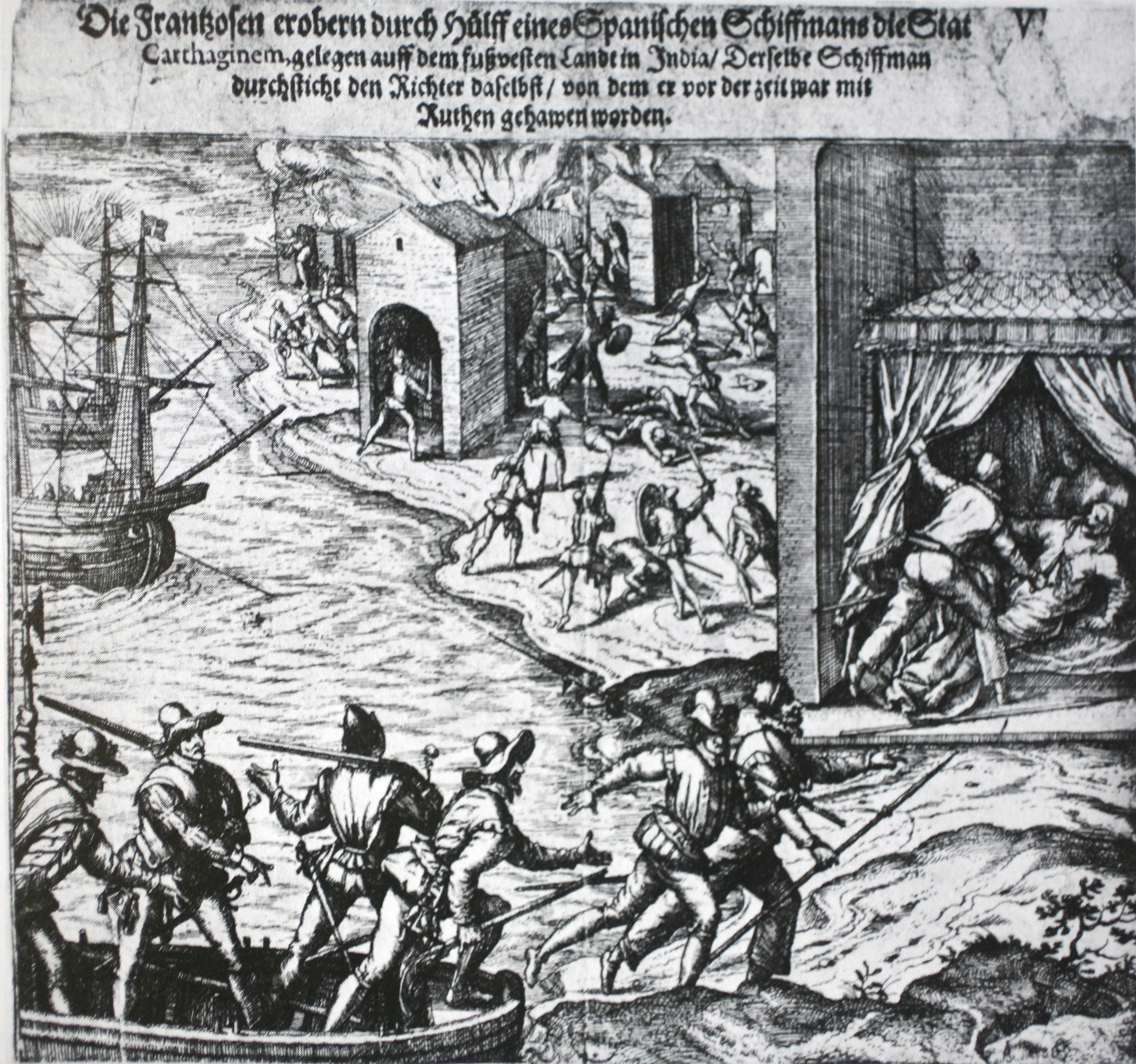
Plunder of Cartagena in 1544 by Jean-François Roberval

Heredia signed friendship pacts with the Indian chiefs of the nearby islands. With the help of Catalina acting as interpreter, Heredia conquered and ruled the area around Cartagena, including Turbaco and the Magdalena River. He looted Indian graves in the Sinú River area and founded Santiago de Tolú. His spoils from these expeditions included a solid gold porcupine weighing 132 pounds – the heaviest gold object plundered during the Conquest. Heredia returned with a bounty of one and half million ducats in gold. Each soldier received six thousand ducats, far more than the amount given to the troops who helped conquer Mexico and Peru.

Pedro de Heredia prepared a second expedition to the South Sea and in 1534 he reached the Sinú River, where he ransacked the indigenous peoples' tombs for gold. He and his troops then penetrated to Antioquia and returned exhausted to Cartagena. Once there, Heredia met Fray Tomas de Toro, the first bishop of Cartagena, sent by king Carlos I of Spain, and his brother Alonso, who had recently arrived from Guatemala. Heredia rescinded Francisco Cesar and appointed Alonso as lieutenant general. His brother Alonso led two expeditions to the Sinú, and in the last he arrived at the Cauca River in 1535. In 1536, Heredia mounted an expedition southward on the Atrato River with no results.

Irregularities in the conduct of the Heredia brothers earned them numerous complaints. In 1536, Judge Juan de Vadillo (a relative of Pedro de Vadillo) was appointed by the Audiencia of Santo Domingo to investigate the charges against Pedro de Heredia and his brother for defaulting on due payments for land and mistreatment of the natives.

Vadillo found Heredia guilty and imprisoned him, assuming for himself the interim government of Cartagena. Heredia was allowed to go to Spain to attend his trial, in which he was acquitted. He returned to Cartagena with some members of his family: a few nieces and his two sons, Antonio, who joined him on all his subsequent expeditions, and Juan, who later settled in Santa Cruz de Mompox. Shortly after his return, Heredia embarked on a quest for the treasure of Dabeiba, the precursor of the myth of El Dorado. After an unproductive long trip, Heredia returned to San Sebastián de Urabá where he accused Jorge Robledo and had him imprisoned, then sent him back to Spain for usurpation of Heredia's jurisdiction. On March 16 of 1542, Heredia departed for Antioquia to annex the territory to Cartagena. There Heredia was taken prisoner himself by Sebastián de Belalcázar and sent to Panama to stand trial for his attempts to seize control of Antioquia. Unwilling to mediate in such a delicate affair, the Royal Audience of Panama released Heredia, who returned to Cartagena.

Immediately after his arrival in Cartagena on July 25, 1544, the city was pillaged by a French Huguenot nobleman, Jean-François Roberval, known as "Robert Baal". Cartagena was not yet fortified and was an easy target for the French. Heredia was obliged to fight with his sword at his own house, as the enemy held the advantage in numbers, forcing him to flee and hide nearby with his relatives. The ransom for the city was 200,000 gold ducats, payment of which was enough to satisfy Roverbal, who then abandoned the region. Shortly after Roverbal's assault, Heredia left Antioquia to annex the territory under the jurisdiction of Cartagena. He returned to Cartagena in 1548 to appear before a residencia (court of inquiry) for abuse of his power and authority during office. The visitador (a royal inspector who reported to the Council of the Indies) Miguel Diez de Armendáriz found him guilty of all charges; Heredia, however, continued to hold his administrative position.

== Death ==
In 1552, Heredia faced 289 new charges filed by the Oidor (a member judge) of the Royal Audience of Santa Fé, Juan Maldonado. The accusations included: illegal appropriation of royal funds, nepotism, obstruction of municipal chapter deliberations, severe abuses directed toward the native population such as burning alive, mutilations and torture. After being found guilty and discharged from office, Heredia returned to Spain to appeal his sentence. On January 27, 1554, (some sources say 1555) his ship La Capitana, part of Cosme Farfán's fleet, sank off the coast of Zahara de los Atunes. He tried to swim ashore, but his body was never found.
