= National Indigenous Organization of Colombia =

Organizations representing the indigenous peoples of Colombia

ONIC
- Founded: 1982
- Type: Non-governmental organization
- Purpose: Indigenous rights
- Region served: Colombia
- Website: onic.org.co

The National Indigenous Organization of Colombia (Spanish: Organización Nacional Indígena de Colombia or ONIC) is an organization representing the Indigenous peoples of Colombia, who, according to the 2018 census, comprise some 1,905,617 people or approximately 3.7% of the population. The organization was founded at the first National Indigenous Congress in 1982.

== History ==
Spanish colonization involved the formalization of structures under the name of cabildos, with both pre-conquest and post-conquest features becoming local traditions. In the Andean highlands, many indigenous people lived essentially as peasants, and leftist as well as state organizations took an interest in incorporating indigenous peoples into peasant-sector organizations in the early and mid 20th century. One such organization was the National Association Of Campesino Users (ANUC).

The incorporation of indigenous peoples of Colombia into regional and national organizations with a specifically indigenous character and agenda was carried out in the 1970s and early 1980s. In the Andean Department of Cauca, the Regional Indigenous Council of Cauca (CRIC) was formed at the Toribío Assembly in 1971. The highly organized CRIC served as something of a hub for indigenous organizing during the 1970s.

In 1980, the first national encounter of indigenous organizations was held in Lomas de Hilarco, Tolima department. The encounter vocally opposed proposed changes to the national indigenous policy of the federal government, called for the respect of indigenous rights, and demanded the evolution and expansion of indigenous territories and the suspension and reversal of colonization within indigenous reserves. By this time, Regional Indigenous Councils existed in the departments of Vaupés, Vichada, Arhuaco, Chocó, and Tolima, as well as Cauca. an interim National Indigenous Coordination was created for coordination, and for the organization of a national assembly. The latter was held in Bosa, near Bogotá, in 1982, and united more than 1500. The organization's initial goals were:

- to work to see that the principles established by law 89 of 1890 were put into practice
- to ensure the benefits of this law were authorized for all indigenous communities in the country through the creation and legalization of indigenous reserves

In collaboration with the sympathetic Betancur administration, numerous indigenous reserves were titled, in which many new indigenous organizations were formed, resulting in a massive expansion of the national organization.

In 2010, an international campaign was launched to expose the suffering of what ONIC describes as the "massive violations of their rights". These violations are caused by "the internal armed conflict in Colombia, the lack of social and differential policies on the part of the Colombian state for indigenous peoples, and the imposition of a devastating development model in indigenous territories." The campaign was launched by two indigenous Colombian leaders on a European tour, and it is aimed at protecting at least eighteen tribes facing the ‘imminent risk of extinction'.

== Program of struggle ==
ONIC's current program of struggle calls for:

- Defense of indigenous autonomy
- Defense of indigenous territory, and the recovery of usurped territories and collective property of indigenous reserves
- Control of the natural resources situated in indigenous territories
- Pushing forward community economic organizations
- Defense of indigenous history, culture and traditions
- Bilingual and bicultural education under the control of the indigenous authorities
- Recovery and pushing forward of traditional medicine and demand for health programs in accordance with the social and cultural characteristics of the communities
- Demanding the application of Law 89 of 1890 and other measures favorable to indigenous peoples
- Solidarity with the struggles of other sectors
- Application of the conclusions of the Organization's Congresses

== See also ==
- Indigenous peoples in Colombia
- Indigenous rights
