= Inga Kichwa =

Kichwa dialect of Columbia

- Ingano
- Native to: Colombia
- Region: Putumayo Department
- Ethnicity: Inga people
- Native speakers: (undated figure of 11,200)
- Language family: Quechua: Quechua II; Northern; Kichwa; Inga Kichwa
- Dialects: Highland; Jungle

Language codes
- ISO 639-3: inb – inclusive code Highland Inga; Individual code: inj – Jungle Inga
- Glottolog: inga1252
- ELP: Inga
- Linguasphere: 84-FAA-a
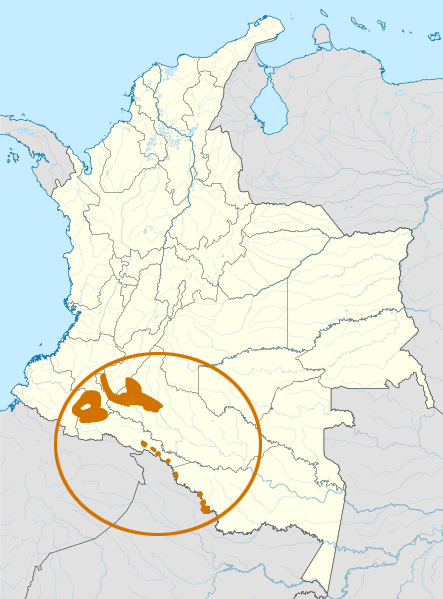
- Map of Inga Kichwa

- Inga Kichwa is classified as Severely Endangered by the UNESCO Atlas of the World's Languages in Danger

Inga Kichwa is a dialect of Kichwa spoken in the Colombian Putumayo region by the Inga people. There are two dialects: Highland Inga, spoken in the Sibundoy valley; and Jungle Inga, spoken on the Putumayo and Japurá Rivers.
