= Inga people =

Indigenous ethnic group in South America

The Inga people are an indigenous ethnic group native to portions of Colombia, Ecuador, and Peru with a claimed historical relation to the Incas.

They speak a dialect of Quechua known as Inga Kichwa, which likely was introduced through both relations with the Incas as well as a Jesuit mission that was briefly established in the region. Quechua, being used as an administrative language in the Andes Mountains since the Incan Empire and well into the Spanish Viceroyalty of Peru, would have definitely been taught. It's believed that the language being shared via the mission led to it being commonly understood by almost all the locals, and later laid the groundwork for the Inga identity to form.

Many today live traditionally in Sibundoy Valley, though are largely found across the borders of Colombia, Ecuador, and Peru.

Almost all Inga people are bilingual in Inga and Spanish, which has caused fear that the Inga language might be an endangered language.

Francisco Tandioy Jansasoy is currently involved in the creation of an Inga–Spanish–English dictionary and accompanying pedagogic trilingual material for its use in universities and in the Inga-speaking communities of Colombia. There has been significant linguistic and anthropological work done in the past 30 years pertaining to the Inga peoples.
