= Santacruz, Nariño =

Santacruz
- Municipality and town
- Flag

- Location of the municipality and town of Santacruz in the Nariño Department of Colombia
- Coordinates: 1°13′19″N 77°40′38″W
- Country: Colombia
- Department: Nariño Department
- Time zone: UTC-5 (Colombia Standard Time)

Santacruz (Spanish pronunciation: [santaˈkɾus]) is a town and municipality in the Nariño Department, Colombia.
