= Zenú language =

Chocoan language of Colombia

Zenú
- Sinúfana, Guajibo
- Native to: Colombia
- Region: Sucre Department, Córdoba Department
- Ethnicity: 307,091 Zenú (2018)
- Native speakers: c. 60 with some knowledge (2011)
- Language family: Chocoan ?: Zenú

Language codes
- ISO 639-3: None (mis)
- Linguist List: qne
- Glottolog: None
- Map of the Sinufana language

Zenú (Cenufana; also Cenu/Zenu/Sinú/Sinúfana) or Guajibo (Guamacó) is a poorly attested, and possibly Chocoan language of Colombia, with approximately 60 people with knowledge of the language. The Ministry of Culture reported that 13.4% of the Zenu spoke their language.
