= San Andrés de Sotavento =

Coordinates: 9°9′N 75°30′W

- Municipality and town
- Flag

- Location of the municipality and town of San Andrés de Sotavento in the Córdoba Department of Colombia.
- Country: Colombia
- Department: Córdoba Department

Population (2020 est.)
  - Total: 48,404
- Time zone: UTC-5 (Colombia Standard Time)

San Andrés de Sotavento is a town and municipality located in the Córdoba Department, northern Colombia.

According to 2020 estimates, the population of San Andrés de Sotavento was 48,404.
