= Mokaná =

Total population
- 24,825 (2005)

Regions with significant populations
- Colombia

Languages
- Spanish, Mokaná (extinct)

Religion
- Christianity

The Mokaná (also Mocaná) are an Indigenous people living in the Atlántico Department of Colombia. They are the only Indigenous community in the department. The Mokaná language, part of the Malibu family of languages, is extinct; only 500 words have been preserved.

== History ==
The first contact between the Mokaná and Europeans occurred in 1529 when the Portuguese conquistador Jerónimo de Melo led an expedition overland from Santa Marta to Malambo, a settlement on the Rio Magdalena named for the Mokaná cacique Pedro Malambo who governed it at that time. The Mokaná largely converted to Christianity in the 16th century.

In 1766, the Spanish Crown granted the Mokaná ownership of 17,500 hectares of land by royal decree.

During the Spanish American wars of independence, Mokaná fought in the Magdalena campaign of 1812 and the siege of Cartagena de Indias in 1821.

On May 2, 1998, the Mokaná were officially recognized as an ethnic group by the government of Colombia.
