= Quimbaya language =

Language of Colombia

Quimbaya
- Kimbaya
- Native to: Colombia
- Ethnicity: Quimbaya
- Extinct: (date missing)
- Language family: unclassified (Chocoan?)

Language codes
- ISO 639-3: cca Cauca (retired)
- Linguist List: qge
- Glottolog: cauc1241 Cauca (retired)
- Linguasphere: 81-EIA-ade
- Map of the Quimbaya language

Quimbaya (Kimbaya) is a poorly attested, extinct language of Colombia. It was spoken by the Quimbaya. Only 10 words can be possibly attributed to Quimbaya. This is insufficient to establish Quimbaya as a distinct language.

== Vocabulary ==
A few words of the Quimbaya language were recorded in Adolf Bastian's Die Culturländer des alten America, which are presented below. Adelaar and Muysken (2004) speculate about the possibility of the wordlist being from Chocoan-speaking immigrants to the area.

Quimbaya vocabulary
| Gloss | Quimbaya |
|---|---|
| egg | terre |
| hen | terremu |
| rooster | termujina |
| toucan | mungua-puluma |
| deer | vigi |
| dogwood | carmaná |
| how are you | chiri valicha |
| come here | huachi minangi |
