= Jambaló =

Coordinates: 2°51′N 76°19′W

Jambaló Jambaló
- Municipality and town
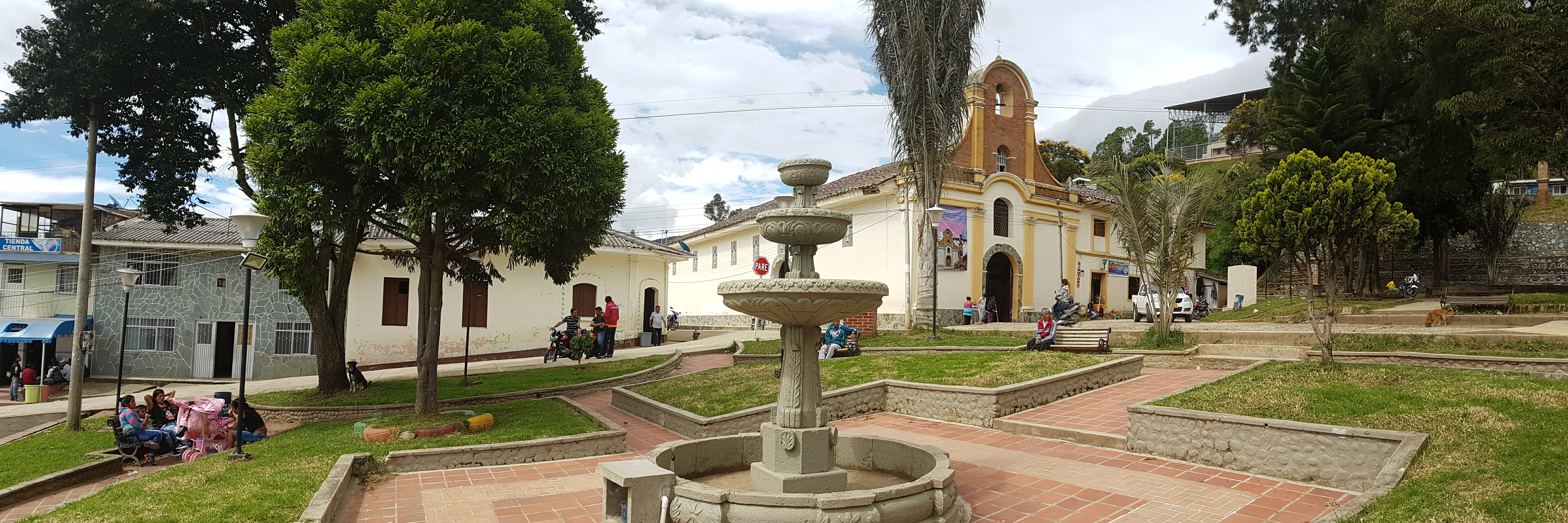
- Jambaló square

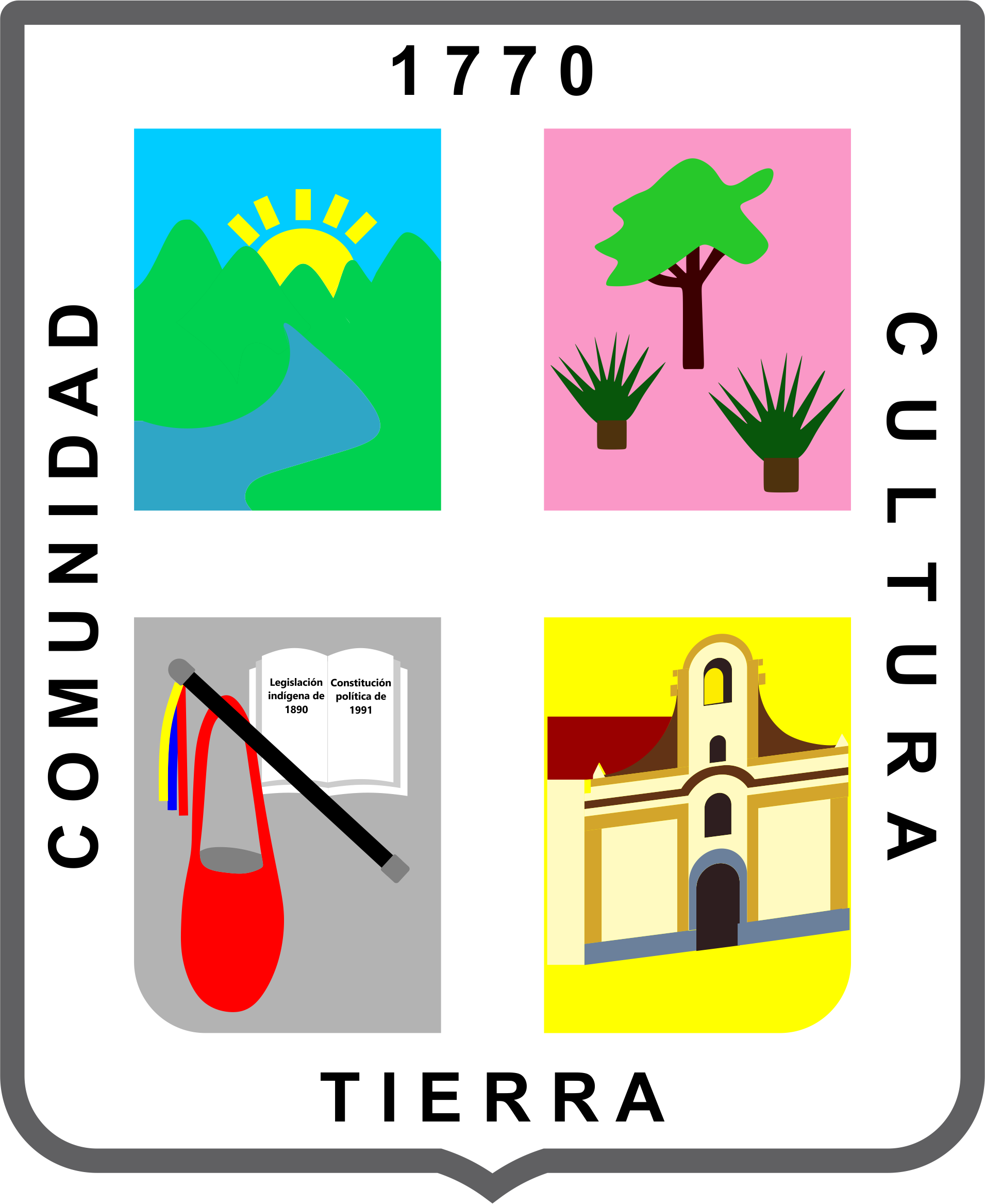
- Flag Coat of arms

- Location of the municipality and town of Jambaló in the Cauca Department of Colombia.
- Country: Colombia
- Department: Cauca Department

Government

Area
  - Total: 254 km^{2} (98 sq mi)

Population (Census 2018)
  - Total: 16,353
  - Density: 64.4/km^{2} (167/sq mi)
- Time zone: UTC-5 (Colombia Standard Time)
- Climate: Cfb
- Website: http://www.jambalo-cauca.gov.co

Jambaló (Spanish pronunciation: [xambaˈlo]) is a municipality and, at the same time, an indigenous reservation of Colombia. It is located in the northeastern department of Cauca, 80 kilometers north of the city of Popayán (the capital of the department). It borders on the north with the municipalities of Caloto and Toribío, on the east with the municipality of Páez, on the south with the municipality of Silvia and on the west with the municipalities of Caldono and Santander de Quilichao. The municipal head is the most populous urban center of the territory and is also called "Jambaló", is located in the extreme south, on the limits with the municipality of Silvia; However, in the rural area it is where the majority of the population lives (94%). Being Jambaló also indigenous guard, the majority of its inhabitants are of the nasa and misak ethnic groups.
