= Álvaro Ulcué Chocué =

Colombian Catholic priest and Nasa activist

The Reverend Father Álvaro Ulcué Chocué
- Born: Álvaro Ulcué Chocué; 16 July 1943; Caldono, Colombia
- Died: 10 November 1984 (aged 41); Santander de Quilichao, Colombia
- Occupation: Priest
- Parent(s): José Domingo Ulcué Yajué; María Soledad Chocué Peña
- Religion: Roman Catholic
- Church: Catholic Church
- Ordained: 1973 (priest)

Álvaro Ulcué Chocué (July 16, 1943 – November 10, 1984) was a Colombian Catholic priest and a member of the Paez people who became an activist in the defense of the rights of his people, as well as other ethnic minorities and poor people of his country. He used to denounce cases of violence and abuses of power, especially during his homilies. His intention to organize his people to recover their ancestral lands created tensions with landowners, who accused him of an uprising. He was murdered by two men on November 10, 1984 in Santander de Quilichao. The crime remains unpunished.

== Life ==
Ulcué was the son of María Soledad Chocué Peña and José Domingo Ulcué Yajué, who was governor of the Indigenous Council. Ulcué did not start his formal education, in the school of Pueblo Nuevo, Caldono, Cauca, until the age of eleven. The school was run by the nuns of the foundation of Mother Laura. Ulcué finished his primary education at the Indocrespo, a residence for Catholic indigenous young people in Guadarrama, Antioquia Department, which was intended to train indigenous clergy. He continued his education at the Minor Seminar of Popayán, run by the Congregation of the Most Holy Redeemer, but after four years he had to stop, due to financial problems. He became a teacher, first in San Benito Abad, Sucre, and then at his own indigenous shelter in Cauca. But the Archdioceses and the sisters of Mother Laura helped him to achieve his dream of becoming a priest, paying for his studies at the Seminary of Popayán. He finished studying theology in the seminary of Ibagué.

== Priesthood ==
Ulcué was ordained as a priest on July 10, 1973 in Popayán. He celebrated his first Mass in Pueblo Nuevo, at the side of his Paez people, an event that got the attention of the time, because it was the first time that an indigenous man became a Catholic priest in Colombia. On the occasion, he said: "In the Seminary, 62 of us began, and now we have reached only three: Tomás Mina, a black, Joel Ortiz, a farmer, and me, an indigenous. This is the fulfillment of the prophecy that God chooses the humble to confuse the powerful."

But Ulcué's ministry would not be easy: sensible to the suffering of his own people, especially with the problem of the loss of ancestral lands to landowners, he became an object of persecution. He received several threats, especially during the 1980s. First, it was his own family that was the object of violence: in unclear events his sister, Gloria, one of his uncles, Serafín, and other Paez persons, were murdered. His father was wounded in events involving the Colombian Police. After the funeral of his sister and his uncle, soldiers searched at his house.

At the end of 1982, the indigenous communities denounced the threats against Fr. Ulcué, stating that the landowners had put a price to his head. He was not intimidated and in 1983 he made a trip to visit other indigenous communities in Colombia and Ecuador, including Afro-Colombians, also victims of discrimination and abuse.

== The conflict of López Adentro ==
The most difficult time came in 1984, with the conflict of López Adentro, a part of the Corinto Paez territory that had been expropriated by landowners. Fr. Ulcué participated in a peaceful recovery of the land on January 25, an action that was answered by a violent participation of Police and Army, with the death of five indigenous, among them a girl aged seven. Fr. Ulcué was active in providing humanitarian assistance to the wounded and he celebrated a Mass on the recovered land.

On November 8 of that same year, the Ministry of Defense, General Oscar Botero Restrepo, visited the troops with other two generals, Ariza and Diaz. Fr. Ulcué invited them to his Parish to discuss the accusations made by the military against his person, saying he was encouraging the indigenous communities to invade private property. He explained to Botero the rights of the indigenous peoples to their ancestral lands and the legal character of their claims to recover the indigenous shelters.

On the day following that meeting, on November 9, the army and the police invaded the land of López Adentro, burned 150 indigenous houses, and destroyed with machines some 300 hectares of crops. "The government will always be on the side of the powerful, to defend their interests, but the interests of the poor must be defended by the same organized communities," Ulcué said when he heard the news. "I invite all Christians and other indigenous companions to rise our voices of protest and to condemn these events as contrary to the Law of God," he asked.

== Assassination ==
On Saturday, November 10, 1984 at 8:30 AM, in Santander de Quilichao, Fr. Ulcué was attacked by two men on a motorbike when he was driving. He got out of his car and fell to the ground alive. The two murdererss returned and shot him again. Some nuns nearby took him to the hospital, but he died a few minutes later. Nobody has been prosecuted for this crime. On August 14, 1996, twelve years after the killing, the Colombian Institute for Land Reform, Incora, reestablished the indigenous shelter of Corinto, with the same details as claimed by Fr. Ulcué, including the land of López Adentro.
