= Páez =

Páez may refer to:

== Places ==
=== Colombia ===
- Páez, Boyacá, a municipality in Boyacá Department
- Páez, Cauca, a municipality in Cauca Department
- Páez River

=== Venezuela ===
- Páez, Apure, a municipality in the state of Apure
- Páez, Miranda, a municipality in the state of Miranda
- Páez, Portuguesa, a municipality in the state of Portuguesa
- Páez, Zulia, a municipality in the state of Zulia

== Other uses ==
- Páez (surname)
- Páez people, of the southwestern highlands of Colombia
- Páez language, the language of the Páez people
- Paezan languages, a hypothetical language family of Colombia and Ecuador
