= Edgar Hernando Tirado Mazo =

Colombian Roman Catholic bishop (born 1939)

The Most Reverend Edgar Hernando Tirado Mazo M.X.Y.
- Vicar Apostolic of Tierradentro emeritus
- Church: Catholic Church
- Appointed: 19 December 2003
- Term ended: 5 June 2015
- Predecessor: Jorge García Isaza
- Successor: Óscar Augusto Múnera Ochoa
- Other post: Titular Bishop of Zaba (since 2003)

Orders
- Ordination: 29 November 1970
- Consecration: 31 March 2004 by Beniamino Stella

Personal details
- Born: 22 February 1939 (age 87) Medellín, Colombia
- Education: Major Seminary of Bogotá

Edgar Hernando Tirado Mazo, M.X.Y. (born 22 February 1939) is a Colombian Roman Catholic prelate who served as Vicar Apostolic of Tierradentro from 2003 to 2015. He is a member of the Yarumal Missionaries (M.X.Y.). He was also Superior General of the Yarumal Missionaries from 1996 to 2002.

== Early life and priesthood ==
Tirado Mazo was born in Medellín, Antioquia, on 22 February 1939. He attended the minor and major seminaries of the Institute of Foreign Missions of Yarumal, and completed the final two years of his theological studies at the Major Seminary of Bogotá. He subsequently became a member of the Institute of Foreign Missions of Yarumal and was ordained a priest on 29 November 1970.

Following his ordination, Tirado served as a missionary and parish priest in Venezuela from 1971 to 1978. From 1979 he held several positions in the Yarumal missionary institute, including director of the year of spirituality, member of its general council, and rector of the Major Seminary of Missions in Medellín. He was parish priest of Emaús in Medellín from 1989 to 1990, before serving in the Diocese of Potosí in Bolivia, where he was spiritual director of the diocesan seminary, diocesan consultor, and parish priest in Vitichi and surrounding areas.

In 1996, he was elected Superior General of the Yarumal Missionaries, a position he held until 2002. He subsequently returned to parish ministry in Vitichi, Bolivia. "Monseñor Edgar Hernando Tirado Mazo, MXY". Conferencia Episcopal de Colombia.

== Episcopate ==
On 19 December 2003, Pope John Paul II appointed Tirado Mazo Vicar Apostolic of Tierradentro in Colombia and assigned him the titular see of Zaba. At the time of his appointment, he was parish priest of San Juan Bautista in Vitichi and had previously served as Superior General of the Yarumal Missionaries.

He received his episcopal consecration on 31 March 2004. The principal consecrator was Beniamino Stella, then titular Archbishop of Midila; the co-consecrators were Alberto Giraldo Jaramillo, Archbishop of Medellín, and Heriberto Correa Yepes, M.X.Y., titular Bishop of Casae Nigrae. "Bishop Edgar Hernando Tirado Mazo, M.X.Y." Catholic-Hierarchy.org.

As vicar apostolic, Tirado Mazo was involved in missionary and pastoral work in Tierradentro and in wider initiatives concerning indigenous communities. In 2010, the Pontifical Mission Societies reported on a meeting involving Tirado Mazo, then president of the Missions Commission of the Colombian Bishops' Conference, and indigenous priests and lay leaders. The discussions addressed evangelization, the preservation of ancestral cultures, and the promotion of a pluralist society open to intercultural dialogue.

== Retirement ==
On 5 June 2015, Pope Francis accepted Tirado Mazo's resignation from the pastoral government of the Apostolic Vicariate of Tierradentro in accordance with canon 401 §1 of the 1983 Code of Canon Law. He was succeeded by Óscar Augusto Múnera Ochoa.
