= Bárbara Muelas =

Misak Colombian academic, linguist and translator (born 1945)

Bárbara Muelas Hurtado (born 1945) is a Misak Colombian academic, linguist, translator and Namtrik language activist. In 2024 became the first indigenous woman to be appointed to the Colombian Academy of Language. Muelas has translated the ethnic chapter of the Colombian Constitution of 1991 into Namtrik.

== Early life and education ==
Muelas was born in the Misak community of Silvia, Cauca, Colombia in 1945, as the daughter of land laborers. Her brother is Lorenzo Muelas and her sister Jacinta was once arrested for defending their territory. Despite not being allowed to study at the school of Silvia, Muelas was able to study, with difficulty, for her high school diploma and was one of the first Misak and indigenous women to receive a degree at the University of Valle, where she studied linguistics.

== Career ==
In the 1980s, she, along with her brother and sister began their struggle to reclaim the lands that had historically belonged to their indigenous community. As a teacher, she created educational and methodological primers and brochures for primary school students to learn to read and write their Namtrik language, while for secondary school students, these primers focused on the culture and history of the Misak people. She has served as deputy governor of the Cabildo de Guambia, which is the indigenous territorial government, with whom she has subsequently collaborated on the promotion and protection of the language.

Once the Colombian Constitution of 1991 was finalized, Muelas received a call from President César Gaviria entrusting her, along with seven other representatives of other Colombian indigenous peoples, with the translation of the ethnic chapter of the Constitution into Namtrik. The work had to be completed in ten months, and the main challenge was translating technical concepts into language that was easily understandable to the indigenous community. In fact, together with teachers and the Cabildo, Muelas had to create concepts that did not exist in the Namtrik language, such as "mining" and "state".

Muelas has also been the manager of the dictionary Namtrik-Spanish, the author of current anthem of the Misak people, and author of essays on mathematics, language, and science aimed at the community. Her work for the Namtrik language has led her community to call her Øskøwampik, which means “the guardian of language and the golden land.”

On 10 December 2024 Muelas was appointed to the Colombian Academy of Language, becoming the first indigenous woman ever to be appointed to the Academy. She was sworn in on 27 July 2025 with the speech “Namtrik and Spanish: parallel times, territories in dialogue".
