= Homero Marín Arboleda =

Colombian Roman Catholic bishop (born 1959)

The Most Reverend Homero Marín Arboleda C.M.
- Apostolic Vicar of Tierradentro
- Church: Catholic Church
- Province: Immediately subject to the Holy See
- Diocese: Apostolic Vicariate of Tierradentro
- Appointed: 12 May 2026
- Installed: 15 August 2026
- Predecessor: Óscar Augusto Múnera Ochoa

Orders
- Ordination: 21 November 1987
- Consecration: 15 August 2026 by Omar Alberto Sánchez Cubillos

Personal details
- Born: 17 November 1959 (age 66) Circasia, Quindío, Colombia
- Education: Pontifical Urbaniana University
- Motto: Evangelizare pauperibus misit me
- Coat of arms

Homero Marín Arboleda, C.M. (born 17 November 1959) is a Colombian Roman Catholic prelate who has served as Apostolic Vicar of Tierradentro since his appointment by Pope Leo XIV on 12 May 2026. He was ordained a bishop on 15 August 2026 in Belalcázar, Cauca.

== Early life and formation ==
Marín Arboleda was born in Circasia, Quindío, Colombia, on 17 November 1959. He entered the Congregation of the Mission in Medellín and spent his initial formation there between 1980 and 1983. He studied philosophy at the Major Seminary La Milagrosa in Medellín and theology at the Major Seminary Villa Paúl in Funza, Cundinamarca. He made his first religious profession on 2 February 1982 and his perpetual profession on 24 November 1984. He was ordained a priest for the Congregation of the Mission on 21 November 1987.

He subsequently obtained a licentiate in missiology from the Pontifical Urbaniana University in Rome in 1996.

== Priesthood ==
Following his ordination, Marín Arboleda served as a parish vicar and then as parish priest in Vitoncó, where he served from 1988 to 1993. In 1988 he was also vice-rector and professor at the Seminario Indígena Páez. He served as parish priest of Willa in 1988 and 1994, as rector of the minor seminary of Páez, and as a professor at the major seminary. He later served as a provincial councillor of the Congregation of the Mission in Colombia from 1997 to 2000, as a formator at the Seminary Indígena Páez from 1998 to 1999, and as rector of the Major Seminary La Milagrosa in Medellín in 2000.

In 2001, he began a long period of missionary service in Papua New Guinea. He was vice-rector of the seminary at Bomana from 2001 to 2007 and parish priest of Holy Name of Jesus in Bomana from 2007 to 2013. From 2009 to 2011 he was superior of the Lazarist Mission in Papua New Guinea. From 2013 he served as parish priest of Saint Anthony of Padua on Kiriwina Island, and from 2019 also served the Blessed John Mazzucconi parish on Woodlark Island.

== Episcopacy ==
On 12 May 2026, Pope Leo XIV appointed Marín Arboleda Apostolic Vicar of Tierradentro, succeeding Óscar Augusto Múnera Ochoa. At the time of his appointment he was serving as parish priest on Kiriwina and Woodlark islands in Papua New Guinea.

His episcopal consecration took place on 15 August 2026 at the Cathedral of Saint Anthony of Padua in Belalcázar, Cauca. The principal consecrator was Omar Alberto Sánchez Cubillos, O.P., Archbishop of Popayán, with Rolando Crisostomo Santos, C.M., Bishop Emeritus of Alotau-Sideia, and Marco Antonio Merchán Ladino, Bishop of Neiva, as principal co-consecrators.

His return to Tierradentro marked a continuation of a longstanding connection with the region. His pastoral service there began in 1987, when he was assigned to Vitoncó, and included work in Willa and in the Indigenous Páez seminaries. The Episcopal Conference of Colombia described his familiarity with the region's Indigenous and rural communities as an important part of his pastoral experience.

== See also ==
Apostolic Vicariate of Tierradentro
