= Miguel Ángel Builes =

Colombian Roman Catholic prelate (1888–1971)

Venerable Bishop Miguel Ángel Builes Gómez
- Bishop of Santa Rosa de Osos
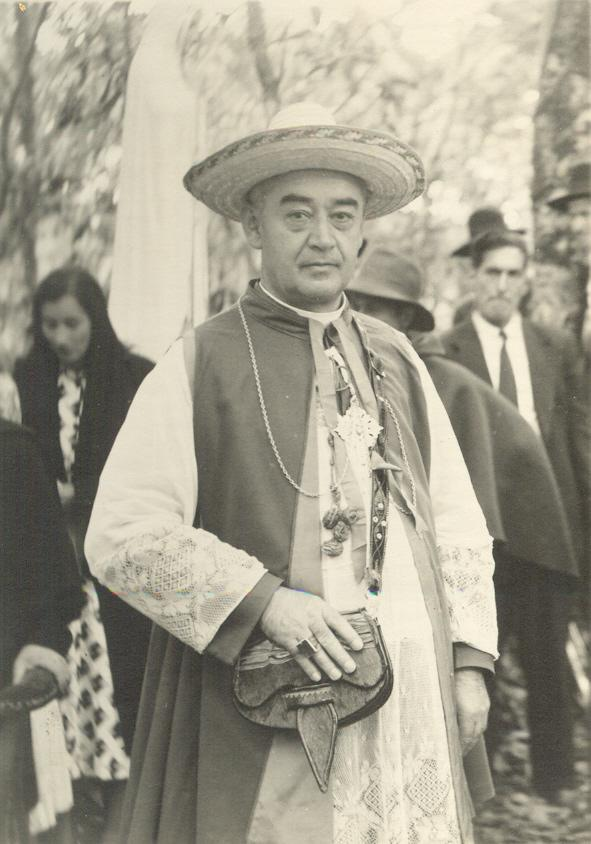
- Builes on 3 July 1927.
- Church: Roman Catholic Church
- Diocese: Santa Rosa de Osos
- See: Santa Rosa de Osos
- Appointed: 27 May 1924
- Installed: 22 October 1924
- Term ended: 29 September 1971
- Predecessor: Maximiliano Crespo Rivera
- Successor: Joaquín García Ordóñez

Orders
- Ordination: 29 November 1914 by Maximiliano Crespo Rivera
- Consecration: 3 August 1924 by Roberto Vicentini
- Rank: Bishop

Personal details
- Born: Miguel Ángel Builes Gómez; 9 September 1888 Donmatías, Antioquía, Colombia
- Died: 29 September 1971 (aged 83) Medellín, Colombia
- Motto: Certa bonum certamen Fidei ("Fight the good fight of faith")
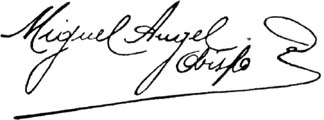
- Signature: Miguel Ángel Builes Gómez's signature

- Coat of arms: Miguel Ángel Builes Gómez's coat of arms

Sainthood
- Venerated in: Roman Catholic Church
- Title as Saint: Venerable
- Attributes: Episcopal attire

Ordination history of Miguel Ángel Builes
History
Priestly ordination
- Ordained by: Maximiliano Crespo Rivera
Episcopal consecration
- Principal consecrator: Roberto Vicentini
- Co-consecrators: Ismael Perdomo Borrero & Maximiliano Crespo Rivera
Episcopal succession
Bishops consecrated by Miguel Ángel Builes as principal consecrator
- Francisco Gallego Pérez: 19 March 1953
- Gustavo Posada Peláez, M.X.Y.: 24 May 1953
- Gerardo Valencia Cano, M.X.Y.: 24 May 1953

Miguel Ángel Builes Gómez (9 September 1888 - 29 September 1971) was a Colombian Roman Catholic prelate who served as the Bishop of Santa Rosa de Osos from 1924 until his death. He was the founder of the Xaverian Missionaries of Yarumal (1927) and the Missionaries of Saint Thérèse (1929) as well as the Contemplative Sisters of the Blessed Sacrament (1939) and the Daughters of Our Lady of Mercy (1951). Builes was a prolific writer of pastoral letters and he condemned a vast range of issues in Colombian life that he deemed to be either too liberal or in breach of traditional doctrine; among those he condemned were women wearing trousers and various dance forms. He was a staunch defender of the faith which made him a controversial figure in his diocese with those praising and condemning him for his activism; but there were those who praised his orthodox views and his defense of doctrine in the face of a wave of secularism.

Despite the controversies that surrounded him the beatification cause for the late bishop opened in 1990 and he became titled as a Servant of God as the first stage in the process. Pope Francis named him as Venerable on 19 May 2018 after confirming Builes led a life of heroic virtue.

== Life ==
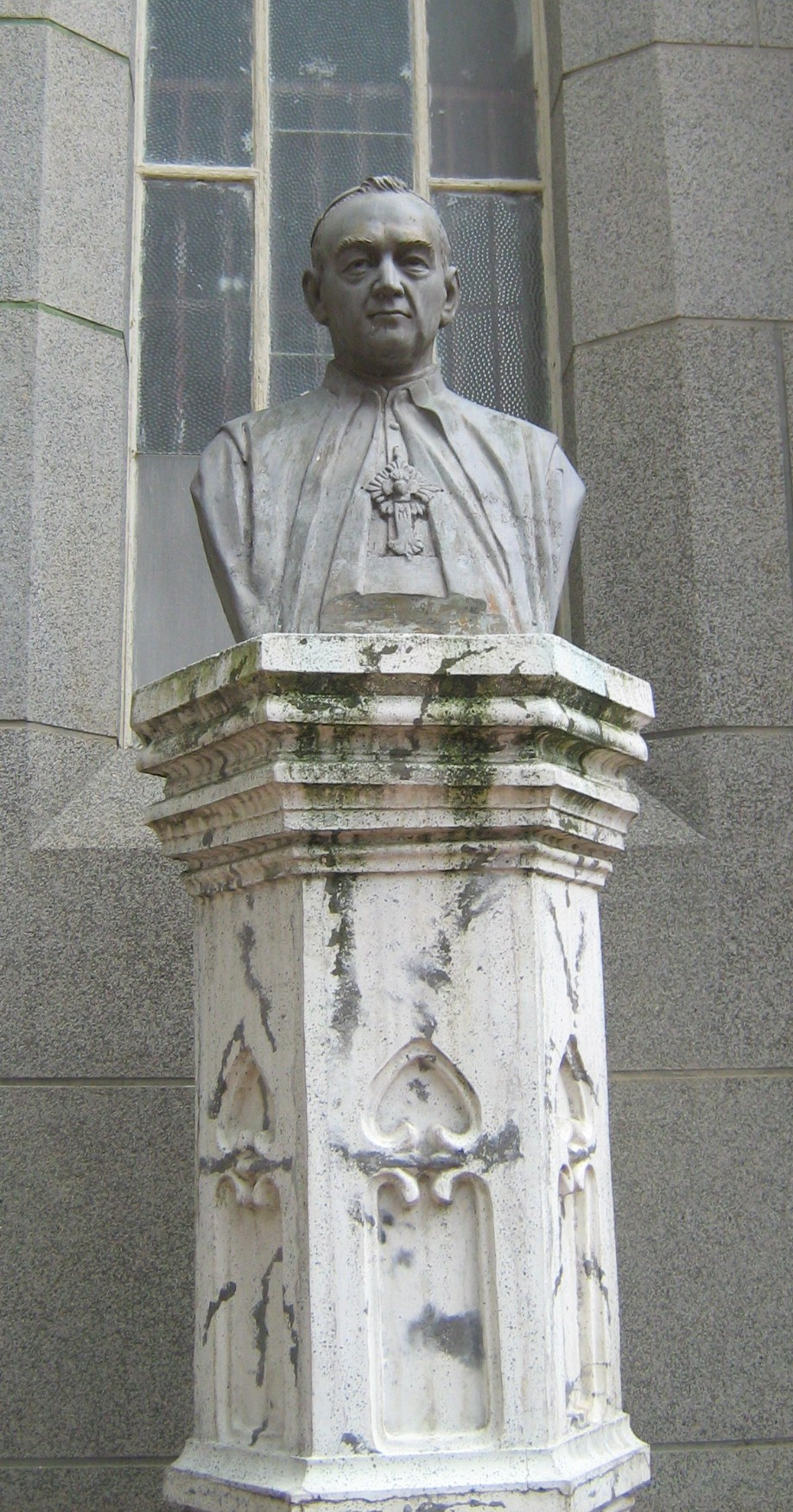
Bust.

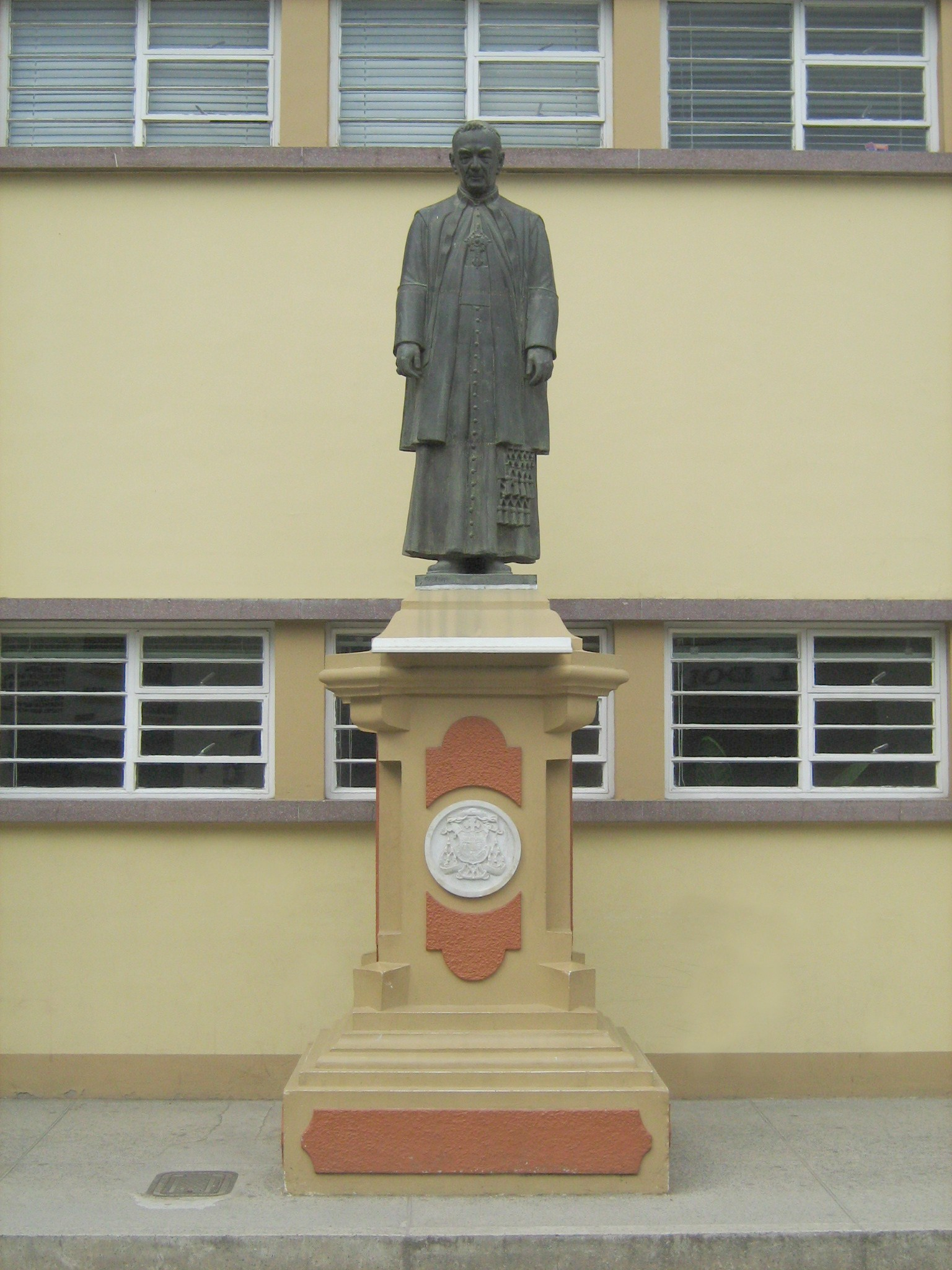
Statue in Santa Rosa de Osos.

Miguel Ángel Builes Gómez was born on 9 September 1888 in Colombia to Agustín Builes Restrepo and Doña Ana María Gómez Peña. He completed his initial education in his hometown before deciding that he wanted to join the priesthood as per his call to the religious life.

On 7 February 1907 he walked to San Pedro de los Milagros where the Eudists accepted him into their institute for his ecclesial studies and there as a seminarian underwent his philosophical studies and humanities. But he relocated to another institute on 8 March 1911 just for his theological education which was a prerequisite for the priesthood. On 18 May 1913 he was elevated into the diaconate and around this stage suffered a severe illness that could have prevented his ordination though he was fortunate enough to overcome this in time. Builes received his ordination to the priesthood on 29 November 1914 from Maximiliano Crespo Rivera in the Santa Rosa de Osos cathedral. From 1915 to 1917 he was in Valdivia and Toledo as a pastor and then in 1917 sent to the new parish of Santa Isabel el Tigre. On 28 December 1918 he was appointed as the curate for another parish.

On 29 November 1923 he learned that Pope Pius XI wanted to appoint him as the new Bishop of Santa Rosa de Osos though formal confirmation of this appointment did not come for several months. He received his episcopal consecration to the episcopate on 3 August 1924 from Roberto Vicentini in the Bogotá cathedral. In his role as a bishop he attended the first session of the Second Vatican Council but also attended the second and fourth sessions.

He seemed to some to possess arrogance and was observed to force a smile on occasion despite being a modest man though this caused consternation to his flock. He was nevertheless a tireless defender of orthodox principles and was harsh in those forces that sought to disrupt good morals and decent standards. He became a maligned and controversial figure due to his condemnations of liberal principles that were too secular in their nature and some believed that he lacked a concrete plan in relation to pastoral activism. On 2 February 1927 he issued a pastoral letter on proper fashion for women believing women had to dress on a modest and conservative level; he also did not approve of women riding horses. Builes said that women in trousers or on horses were sins that he alone could absolve. He issued another pastoral letter for Easter on 5 April 1931 and issued two others both in 1939 as an attack on the secular nature of carnivals. He was also a fierce critic of Communism which he viewed as a grave contradiction of the faith.

On 29 June 1927 he founded the Xaverian Missionaries of Yarumal and on 11 April 1929 founded the Missionaries of Saint Thérèse (it received pontifical approval on 9 May 1953). In 1939 he established the Contemplative Sisters of the Blessed Sacrament prior to World War II. In 1951 he also founded the Daughters of Our Lady of Mercy. In the 1950s he criticized those occasions where women were alone and not with a male companion - such as a husband - regardless of whether it was dark outside or not. He prohibited mambo dancing as a sin and a corruption of morals and condemned this and the dissent to that ruling in a 24 February 1953 pastoral letter while also criticizing the polka and the waltz among other dance forms. Pope Pius XII - in 1952 - titled him as a Domestic Prelate of His Holiness and an Assistant to the Pontifical Throne (or Monsignor) and he often travelled to Rome to see the pope with his brother bishops for Ad Limina visits. Among his pastoral initiatives was the establishment of 23 new parishes.

Builes submitted his letter of resignation to Pope Paul VI on 15 February 1967 on the grounds of age and his resignation was accepted on 22 April. Builes relocated to Medellín where he remained until his death on 29 September 1971.

== Beatification cause ==
The beatification cause opened under Pope John Paul II on 8 October 1990 after the Congregation for the Causes of Saints issued the official "nihil obstat" and titled Builes as a Servant of God. The diocesan process was held in the Santa Rosa de Osos diocese from 29 September 2001 until 29 September 2003 when it was closed and all documentation sent to the C.C.S. in Rome who validated the process on 19 January 2007. The postulation later submitted the Positio dossier to the C.C.S. in 2013 for assessment. Theologians approved the cause on 6 December 2016 with the C.C.S. confirming it later in 2018. Pope Francis named Builes as Venerable on 19 May 2018 after confirming that the late bishop had led a life of heroic virtue.

The current postulator for this cause is the Trinitarian priest Antonio Sáez de Albéniz.
