= Lorenzo Muelas =

Guambiano activist (born 1938)

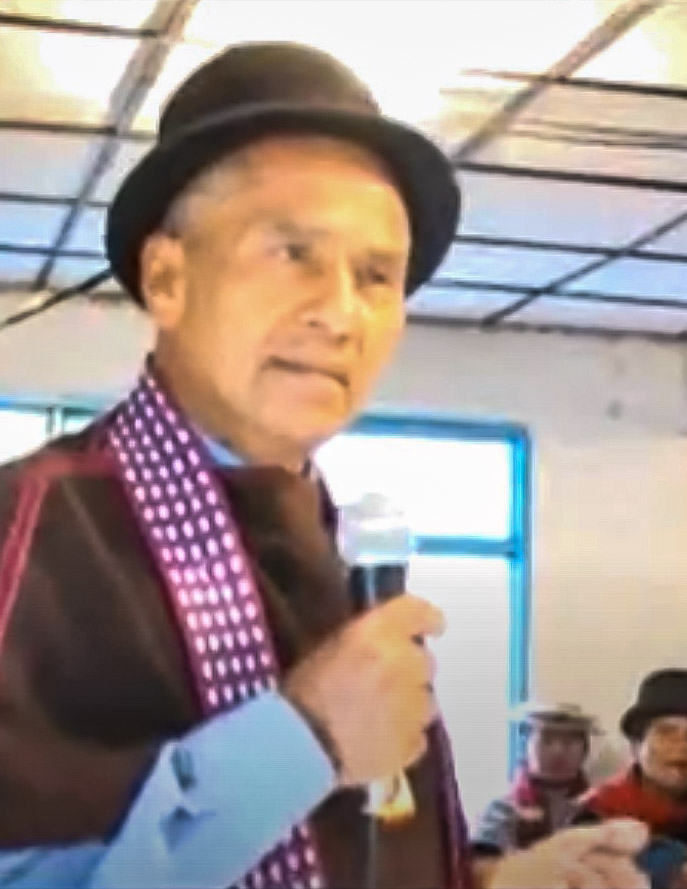
Lorenzo Muelas in 2011

Lorenzo Muelas Hurtado (born July 9, 1938) is a Guambiano activist and politician in Colombia. Muelas was one of the indigenous leaders who participated in the Constituent Assembly of Colombia in 1991. He was a member of the Senate of Colombia from 1994 to 1998.

== Biography ==
Muelas was born on July 9, 1938, in Silvia, Cauca, Colombia. His sister is translator and academic Bárbara Muelas. Muelas was elected to the Constituent Assembly of Colombia in 1991 and was a co-founder of the Consejo Regional Indígena del Cauca organization. He also co-founded the Indigenous Authorities of Colombia (AICO) political party. According to a report by The New York Times, Muelas "escaped three assassination attempts since he left a local landowner's debt peonage system 35 years ago".

In 1994, Muelas was elected to the Senate of Colombia with 270,000 votes in his favor, and served in the body until 1998. In 2006, Muelas was elected Governor of Guambia, the highest position in his community. Muelas is the author of La fuerza de la gente: juntado recuerdos sobre la terrajería en Guambía, Colombia, which chronicled his experience as an indigenous activist. In a 2007 interview with Indian Country Today, Muelas criticized the United States over the Plan Colombia doctrine.
