= Gold-spotted marsupial frog =

Conservation status
- Endangered (IUCN 3.1)

Scientific classification
- Kingdom: Animalia
- Phylum: Chordata
- Class: Amphibia
- Order: Anura
- Family: Hemiphractidae
- Genus: Gastrotheca
- Species: G. aureomaculat

Binomial name
- Gastrotheca aureomaculat Cochran & Goin, 1970

Synonyms
- Gastrotheca mertensi Cochran & Goin, 1970

Species of amphibian

The gold-spotted marsupial frog (Gastrotheca aureomaculata) is a species of frog in the family Hemiphractidae. It is endemic to Colombia.

== Habitat ==
This arboreal frog has been seen on vegetation next to streams in Andean forests. Occasionally, it is found on trees in farmers' gardens or on bushes. Scientists have seen the frog between 2,000 and 2,600 m (6,600 and 8,500 ft) above sea level.

Scientists have seen the frog in a protected place, Parque Nacional Natural Puracé. It also lives on the reserves of the Naza and Paez indigenous people, who limit farming.

== Reproduction ==
The female frog carries her eggs in a pouch on her back. She brings the tadpoles to small temporary pools with grassy bottoms. Scientists have seen female frogs with as many as 116 eggs in their pouches.

== Threats ==
The IUCN classifies this species as endangered. Principal threats include habitat loss associated with logging and legal and illegal farms.
