= Apostolic Vicariate of Tierradentro =

Catholic missionary jurisdiction in Colombia

Apostolic Vicariate of Tierradentro Apostolicus Vicariatus Tierradentroënsis

Location
- Country: Colombia

Statistics
- Area: 2,087 km^{2} (806 sq mi)
- Population: Total; Catholics: (as of 2010); 66,500; 55,500 (83.5%)
- Parishes: 10

Information
- Denomination: Catholic Church
- Rite: Roman Rite
- Established: 13 May 1921 (105 years ago)
- Cathedral: Catedral San Antonio de Ambostá de Belalcázar

Current leadership
- Pope: Leo XIV
- Vicar Apostolic: Homero Marín Arboleda
- Bishops emeritus: Óscar Augusto Múnera Ochoa; Edgar Hernando Tirado Mazo, M.X.Y.

The Apostolic Vicariate of Tierradentro (Latin: Apostolicus Vicariatus Tierradentroënsis) in the Catholic Church is located in the town of Belalcázar in the municipality of Páez, Cauca, in Colombia.

== History ==
On 13 May 1921 Pope Benedict XV established the Prefecture Apostolic of Tierradentro from the Archdiocese of Popayán. Blessed John Paul II elevated the prefecture to an Apostolic Vicariate on 17 February 2000. The most recent vicar apostolic of Tirrradentro Bishop Oscar Augusto Múnera Ochoa resigned on 20 July 2024 amid sexual abuse allegations.

== Ordinaries ==
- Emilio Larquère, C.M. † (9 Nov 1923 – 3 Jul 1948) Died
- Enrique Alejandro Vallejo Bernal, C.M. † (27 Oct 1950 – 1977) Resigned
- Germán Garcia Isaza, C.M. † (21 Jul 1977 – 18 Jun 1988) Appointed, Bishop of Caldas
- Jorge García Isaza, C.M. (5 May 1989 – 25 Apr 2003) Resigned
- Edgar Hernando Tirado Mazo, M.X.Y. (19 Dec 2003 – 5 Jun 2015)
- Óscar Augusto Múnera Ochoa (5 Jun 2015 – 20 Jul 2024) Resigned
  - Marco Antonio Merchán Ladino (20 Jul 2024 – 15 Aug 2026), Apostolic Administrator
- Homero Marín Arboleda, C.M. (12 May 2026 - present)

== See also ==
- Roman Catholicism in Colombia
