= Nevado del Huila =

Highest volcano in Colombia

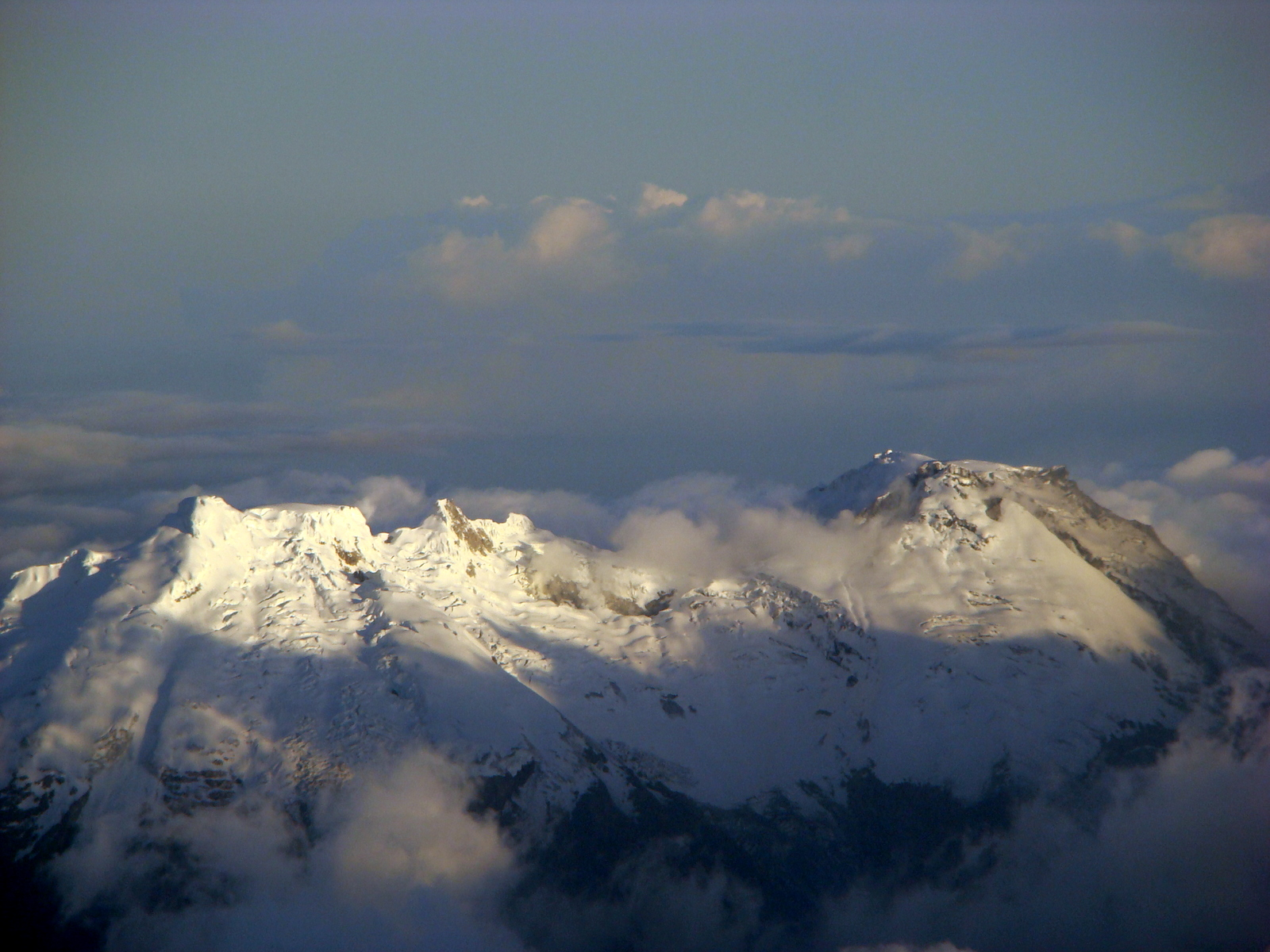
- Nevado del Huila in December 2008

Highest point
- Elevation: 5,364 m (17,598 ft)
- Prominence: 2,650 m (8,690 ft)
- Listing: Ultra
- Coordinates: 02°55′48″N 76°01′48″W

Geography
- Location within Colombia
- Location: Cauca, Huila & Tolima; Colombia
- Parent range: Central Ranges; Andes

Geology
- Mountain type: Andesitic stratovolcano
- Volcanic zone: North Volcanic Zone
- Volcanic belt: Andean Volcanic Belt
- Last eruption: 2008 to 2012

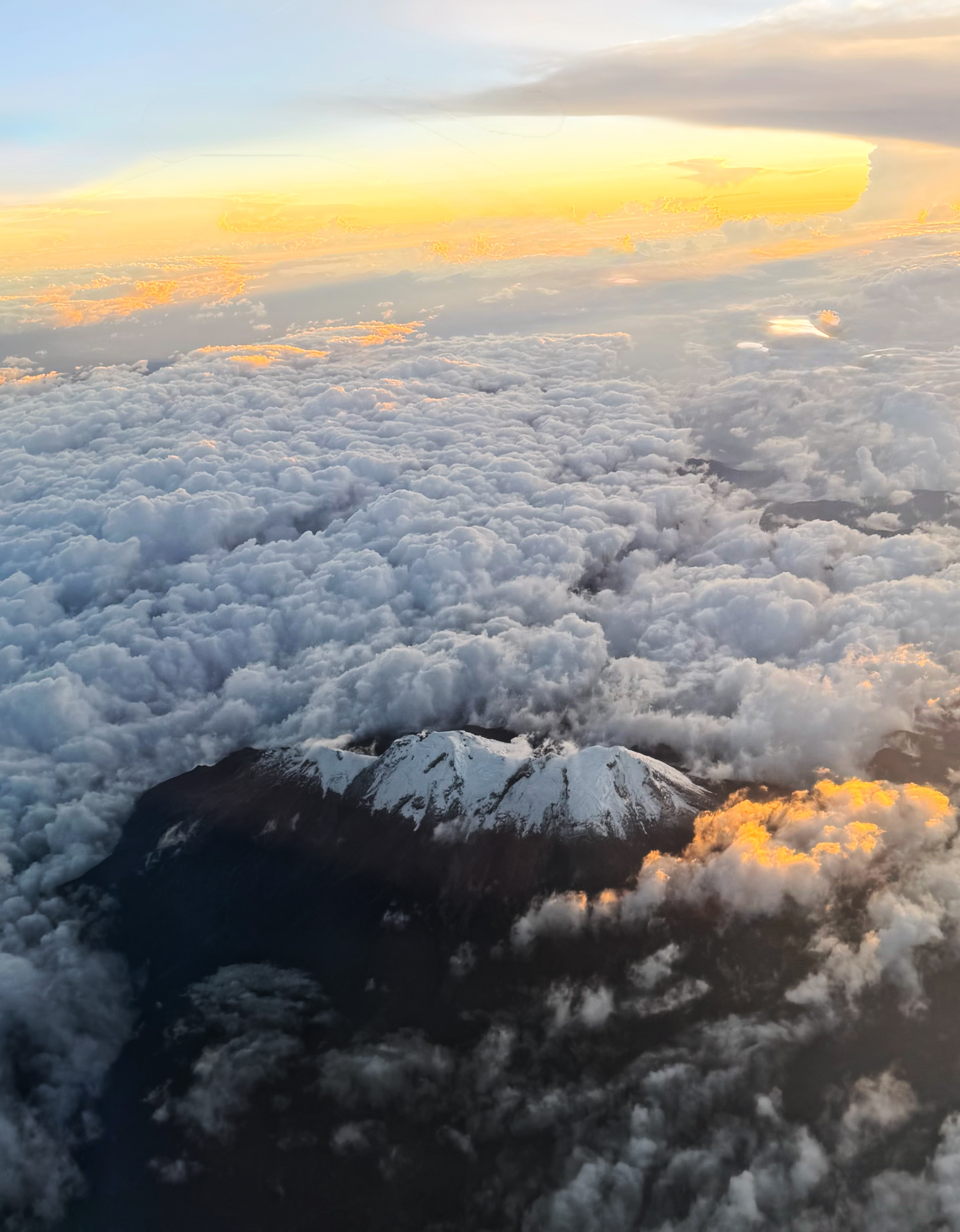
Aerial view of Nevado del Huila

Nevado del Huila (/nɛˈvɑːdoʊ dɛl ˈwiːlə/, Spanish pronunciation: [neˈβaðo ðel ˈwila]) at 5,364 metres (17,598 ft) is the highest volcano in Colombia, located at the tripoint of the departments of Huila, Tolima and Cauca. It is visible from the city of Cali. The andesitic volcano is located on top of the Ibagué Batholith.

After being dormant for more than 500 years, the volcano showed heavy signs of activity in 2007 and 2008. As of February 20, 2007, there were more than 7,000 "minor" seismic events, and a high state of alert was in place for the departments of Cauca, Huila, Caldas and Valle del Cauca. The volcano erupted twice in April 2007, once in April 2008 and again in November 2008. Any eruption would affect the small villages around the volcano, mostly Páez, where the inhabitants still have in memory the 1985 eruption of the Nevado del Ruiz volcano that caused the Armero tragedy.

== Eruptions ==
=== 2007 eruption ===
On April 18, 2007, the volcano erupted twice, causing avalanches into the Paez River; this event caused water levels to rise along the Magdalena River. More than 4,000 people were evacuated with no casualties reported.

=== 2008 activity and eruption ===
Nevado del Huila became active again in March 2008. After a multitude of earthquakes inside the volcano, Colombian authorities declared a state of yellow alert on March 18. The state of alert was increased to orange on March 29, meaning an eruption could be expected within two weeks. Hundreds of people were evacuated. On April 14, 2008, at 11:08 pm, an ash eruption took place, prompting the government to issue a red alert and evacuate 13,000 to 15,000 people from around the mountain. The state of red alert was again lowered to orange on April 16, following diminished activity.

==== November 2008 eruption ====
On November 20, 2008, the volcano erupted at 02:45 GMT (at 21:45 on November 20 local time) according to Colombian Institute of Geology and Mining. An immediate mass-scale evacuation was put in motion by the Colombian authorities, which the inhabitants of some towns reportedly refused. There were no injuries reported at the time. On November 23, 2008, BBC News, citing Colombian authorities, announced that the eruption had claimed ten lives, with 12,000 nearby residents being evacuated and emergency services unable to reach many of the more remote affected locations. The eruption had triggered an avalanche of earth and debris that damaged houses, bridges and crops on plantations. The three small towns of Paicol, La Plata and Belalcázar along the Páez River were affected by this eruption.

Extensive instrumentation of the volcano, put in place by the existing national system for prevention and care of disasters, which includes training of local inhabitants in high-risk regions and deployment of alarms in nearby towns, reportedly prevented large-scale deaths. President Álvaro Uribe ordered the Air Force of Colombia to create an "air bridge" to provide supplies for cut off towns along the Páez River.

Major volcanoes in Colombia

== See also ==
- List of volcanoes in Colombia
- List of volcanoes by elevation
- List of mountains in Colombia
