= Jesús Emilio Jaramillo Monsalve =

Colombian Roman Catholic prelate

Blessed Jesús Emilio Jaramillo Monsalve M.X.Y.
- Bishop of Arauca
- Church: Roman Catholic Church
- Diocese: Arauca
- See: Arauca
- Appointed: 19 July 1984
- Installed: 25 January 1971; 21 September 1984
- Term ended: 3 October 1989
- Successor: Rafael Arcadio Bernal Supelano
- Previous posts: Superior-General of the Xaverian Missionaries of Yarumal (1959–1966); Vicar Apostolic of Arauca (1970–1984); Titular Bishop of Strumnitza (1970–1984)

Orders
- Ordination: 1 September 1940
- Consecration: 10 January 1971 by Angelo Palmas
- Rank: Bishop

Personal details
- Born: Jesús Emilio Jaramillo Monsalve; 16 February 1916 Santo Domingo, Antioquia, Colombia
- Died: 2 October 1989 (aged 73) Arauquita, Arauca, Colombia
- Motto: El Señor Viene ("The Lord comes")

Sainthood
- Feast day: 3 October
- Venerated in: Roman Catholic Church
- Beatified: 8 September 2017; Villavicencio, Colombia by Pope Francis
- Attributes: Episcopal attire
- Patronage: Diocese of Arauca

Jesús Emilio Jaramillo Monsalve, M.X.Y. (16 February 1916 – 2 October 1989) was a Colombian Roman Catholic prelate who was a professed member of the Xaverian Missionaries of Yarumal and served as the Bishop of Arauca from 1984 until his assassination. Jaramillo was a staunch opponent of the E.L.N. and spoke out against their atrocities in the midst of conflict and a drug war. But this led to him being marked for death and he was killed not long after being kidnapped and tortured.

Jaramillo's cause for beatification opened in 2000. He was titled as a Servant of God and his beatification was dependent on whether or not the cause could prove if Jaramillo was killed "in odium fidei" (in hatred of the faith). Pope Francis confirmed his beatification in mid-2017 and the pope himself beatified Jaramillo during the papal visit to Colombia on 8 September 2017 in Villavicencio.

== Life ==
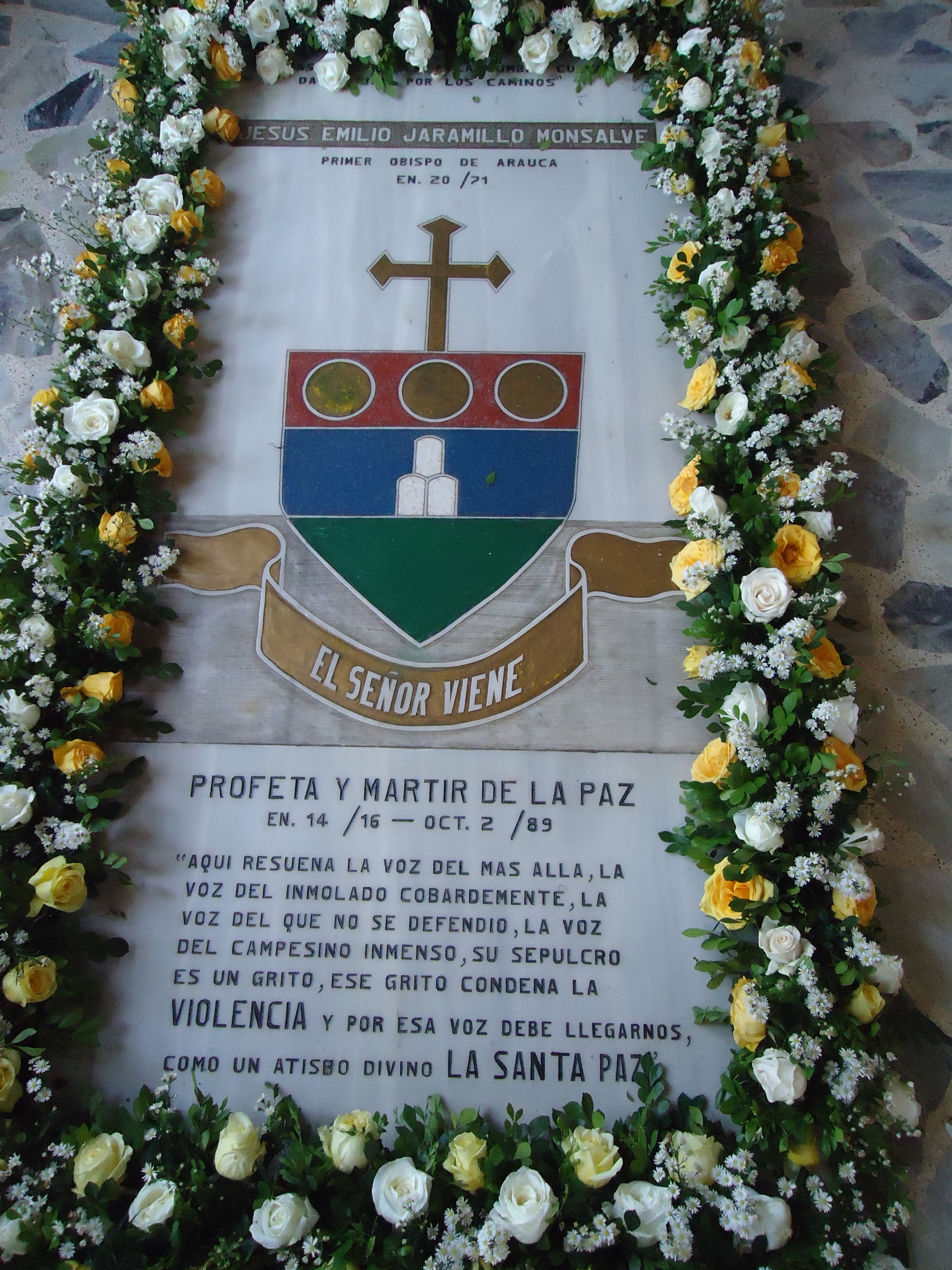
Jaramillo's tomb.

Jesús Emilio Jaramillo Monsalve was born in 1916 in Colombia.

He commenced his ecclesial studies in February 1929 and made his first vows into the Xaverian Missionaries of Yaramul on 3 December 1936. His period of novitiate spanned from 1935 to 1936. Jaramillo became a member of the Xaverian Missionaries of Yaramul on 3 December 1944 after he had been ordained to the priesthood on the morning of 1 September 1940; his perpetual profession came later in February 1946. Jaramillo celebrated his first Mass on 8 September in his hometown. His first assignment after ordination was to serve as a pastor at Sabanalarga while he completed his theological studies in Bogotá from 1942 to 1944 when he received his doctorate. It was also at this time that he served as a chaplain and adviser at a female prison. In 1945 he was made the spiritual director of seminarians and a couple of months later was made the novice master. In 1945 he was made a professor of dogmatics and Sacred Scripture and he also taught Hebrew and Greek. From 1951 to 1959 he served as the rector of seminarians and from 1959 to 1966 served as the order's Superior-General.

Pope Paul VI – on 11 November 1970 – appointed him as the Vicar Apostolic of Arauca and as the Titular Bishop of Strumnitza which led to him receiving his episcopal consecration in 1971 from Angelo Palmas. He was enthroned in his vicariate two weeks later. The apostolic vicariate was later dissolved in mid-1984 and Pope John Paul II made him the new Bishop of Arauca which he formed from the vicariate. His formal enthronement was celebrated before the apostolic nuncio Angelo Acerbi on 21 September 1984. The bishop championed the rights of the poor and unrepresented and espoused the view that all had the right to a voice. He also was known for being a shepherd who cared about the spiritual needs of his flock and who fought against social injustice.

On 30 September 1989 he met with archdiocesan officials in the afternoon for the coordination of new content for the next edition of the diocesan newsletter. On 1 October at 7:00am he went to a local parish in another town and arrived there at 9:00am before celebrating a Mass at around 11:00am for baptisms that had been planned. He had lunch following this and went to rest.

== Kidnapping and death ==
Jaramillo's death came on 2 October 1989 at around 7:00pm after the E.L.N. leftist rebels kidnapped and tortured him before killing him though his priest companion Jose Munoz Pareja was released prior to his murder unharmed. His constant criticisms of the rebels' actions led them to decide on killing him as well as the fact that Jaramillo's mediation efforts were unacceptable to them since it was believed a Church-State deal would exclude them. The pair were kidnapped while making several parish visits on 2 October at around 3:30pm after three armed men intercepted their vehicle. His companion was released unharmed not long after their kidnapping at 6:30pm after the men stopped the car and forced Pareja to leave. Pareja did not wish to leave his bishop but Jaramillo asked him to do so out of obedience.

Jaramillo was shot twice in the head with an assault rifle with his hands tied behind his back. His remains were discovered on the morning of 3 October in a rural area near the Venezuelan border as peasants discovered him. The Cardinal Archbishop of Bogotá Mario Revollo Bravo told RCN Radio that there was "no explanation" for the killing that "caused profound pain".

=== Memorial ===
John Paul II sent an official telegram of condolence on 4 October expressing his "profound sorrow" over the assassination which he deemed to be the product of "unjustifiable violence". The Colombian Episcopal Conference referred to the assassination as "vile, sacrilegious and pitiless". His funeral was celebrated on 5 October.

=== Aftermath ===
However, according to recent claims by the ELN leadership in an article "Una autocrítica por la muerte del Obispo Jaramillo" (a self criticism for the death of Bishop Jaramillo), the reasons for ordering his assassination included: 1. Allegations of his direct involvement in widespread corruption and mismanagement of social funds (Pascol), obtained by ELN through a revolutionary tax on the oil pipeline construction company, and subsequently managed by Jaramillo and 2. His overt support for a paramilitary group in Caño Jesús de Arauca, known as "Grupo Cívico Armado de Arauca" (Cruciagar) which has been held responsible for numerous decapitations, acid attacks and murders of local villagers, peasants, farmers and community activists, which Jaramillo hypocritically failed to condemn.

In 2008 the Colombian government apprehended Carlos Marin Guarin who had ordered the bishop's killing due to Jaramillo's vocal opposition to the E.L.N. and its aims and his overt support for a local paramilitary group responsible for several murders, decapitations and acid attacks on local peasants, farmers, trade unionists and community activists. The E.L.N. later admitted after Jaramillo's death that he had been kidnapped so as to use him as a message-bearer to President Virgilio Barco Vargas to hear their demands.

John Paul II – during the Great Jubilee in 2000 – celebrated an ecumenical service dedicated to the witnesses of faith who had been killed in hatred of their faith. Jaramillo was one prominent name mentioned during the service.

== Beatification ==
The beatification process commenced under John Paul II on 7 July 2000 after the Congregation for the Causes of Saints issued the official "nihil obstat" (nothing against) to the cause and titled Jaramillo as a Servant of God. The diocesan phase of investigation opened not long after in Arauca and concluded its business on 29 June 2006 before all documentation was sent to the C.C.S. in Rome in boxes where the latter validated the process. The postulation sent the Positio dossier to the C.C.S. officials in 2015 for investigation though the cause almost came to a halt since it was uncertain whether Jaramillo was killed for religious or political reasons. But the cause managed to continue with theologians approving the dossier on 11 May 2017 and the C.C.S. following suit on 4 July 2017.

Pope Francis approved the cause on 7 July 2017 and thus approved Jaramillo's beatification. Francis himself presided over the beatification during his papal visit to Colombia at an open-air Mass on 8 September 2017 at Catama Field in Villavicencio. Jaramillo's remains were exhumed for canonical inspection on 24 August 2017.

The current postulator for this cause is the Redemptorist priest Antonio Marrazzo.

== See also ==
- List of kidnappings
