= Páez, Cauca =

Coordinates: 2.65472°N 75.9928°W

Páez
- Municipality and town
- Municipality of Páez
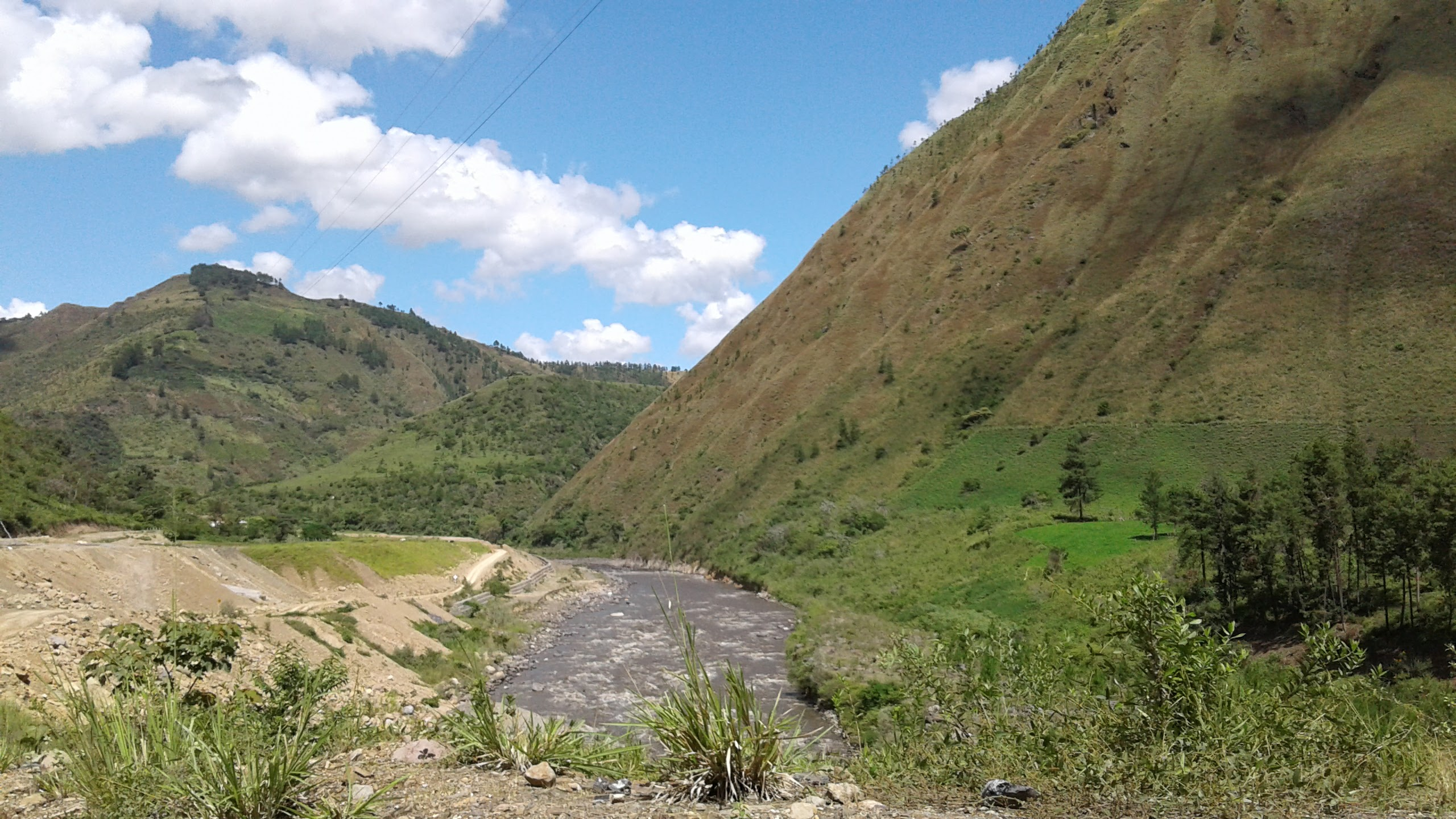
- Páez River in the municipality

- Flag
- Motto(s): Culture, God, Progress
- Anthem: Himno de Paez
- Location of the municipality and town of Páez, Cauca in the Cauca Department of Colombia.
- Country: Colombia
- Department: Cauca Department

Government
  - Mayor: Hugo Javier Muñoz Achipiz (2024–2027)

Population (2020 est.)
  - Total: 36,977
- Demonym: Páezan
- Time zone: UTC-5 (Colombia Standard Time)
- Climate: Af
- Website: www.paez-cauca.gov.co

Páez (Spanish pronunciation: [ˈpaes]) is a municipality in the Cauca Department, Colombia. The town of Belalcázar is the main urban center of the municipality. It was founded in 1905 by Valencia, Mosquera and Lemus. The town is located by the steps of the Nevado del Huila Volcano, the municipality borders to the northeast with the Tolima Department, to the west with the Huila Department, southwest with the municipality of Inza, to the west with the municipalities of Silvia and Jambalo and to the north with the municipality of Toribio covering a total area of 1,258 km^{2} (486 sq mi).

== History ==
During Colombia's federal period, it formed part of the Territory of Guanacas. The municipality was established by Decree n.º 1510 of 13 December 1907, signed by President Rafael Reyes Prieto.

On 6 June 1994, the area was struck by an earthquake followed by an avalanche of the Páez River and its tributaries, which affected much of the municipality and several neighbouring municipalities. Towns such as Irlanda, Huila, and Tóez disappeared, among others, and the disaster claimed many lives. Through the efforts of several institutions, including the Nasa Kiwe Corporation, the area has since been partially rebuilt.

== Geography ==
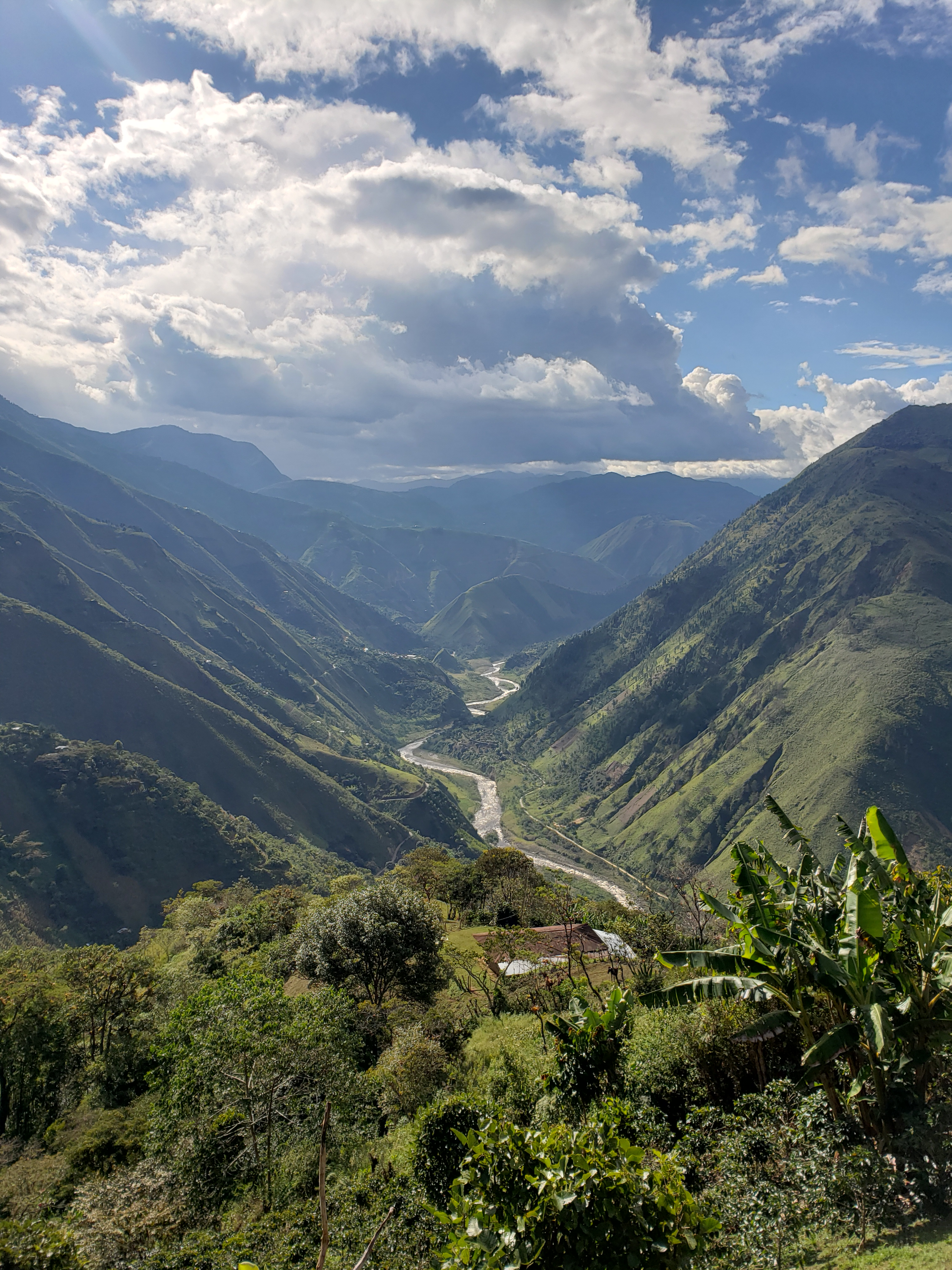
Paez River valley

The municipality is located in the foothills of the Central Mountain Range and includes all thermal floors, which explains the climatic differences and the variation in natural vegetation. It has a population of 36,287 inhabitants (DANE projection, 2005). The town of Belalcázar has an average temperature of 20 °C and is situated at an elevation of 1,450 metres above sea level. National Route 37, popularly known as the Trampoline of Death, passes through Belalcázar.

Administratively, it is divided into fifteen Indigenous reserves: Avirama, Belalcázar, Cohetando, Chinas, Lame, Mosoco, Pickwe Tha Fiw, San José, Ricaurte, Tálaga, Tóez, Togoima, Vitoncó, Wila, and Zuin, as well as two corregimientos: Itaibe and Riochiquito.

One of its notable characteristics is its multiethnic composition, including Indigenous people (of the Páez ethnic group), Afro-descendants, and mestizos.

To the north it borders the municipality of Ataco in the department of Tolima; to the northeast the municipality of Teruel in the department of Huila; to the east the municipalities of La Plata, Íquira, and Nátaga in the department of Huila; to the southwest the municipality of Inzá in the department; and to the west the municipalities of Silvia, Jambaló, and Toribío.

== Demographics ==
At the 2018 census, Páez had a population of 37,666. 30,652 of these people were indigenous (primarily Páez), 2,312 were Afro-Colombians, 2 were Romani, 2 were Palenqueros of San Basilio, and 1 was Raizal. Another 4,564 did not state an ethnicity, and 134 refused to answer.

== Administrative divisions ==
In addition to its municipal seat, Belalcázar (pop. 2,898), Páez has jurisdiction over the following populated places (populations as of 2018):

- Avirama (pop. 96)
- Cohetando (pop. 416)
- Coquiyó (pop. 151)
- El Rodeo (pop. 130)
- Guadualejo (pop. 298)
- Guapio (pop. 274)
- Guaquiyó (pop. 100)
- Itaibe (pop. 448)
- La María
- La Mesa de Avirama (pop. 5)
- La Mesa de Belalcázar (pop. 22)
- La Mesa de Togoima (pop. 327)
- Mesa de Caloto (pop. 451)
- Mesa de Tálaga (pop. 206)
- Minuto de Dios (pop. 274)
- Ricaurte (pop. 1,074)
- Riochiquito (pop. 518)
- San Luis (Potrerillo) (pop. 231)
- Santa Rosa
- Tálaga (pop. 162)
- Tóez
- Vicanenga

== Climate ==
Climate data for Toez, elevation 1,860 m (6,100 ft), (1971–2000)
Month	Jan	Feb	Mar	Apr	May	Jun	Jul	Aug	Sep	Oct	Nov	Dec	Year
Mean daily maximum °C (°F)	23.2 (73.8)	23.2 (73.8)	23.2 (73.8)	22.8 (73.0)	22.6 (72.7)	21.9 (71.4)	21.2 (70.2)	21.5 (70.7)	22.0 (71.6)	22.4 (72.3)	22.6 (72.7)	22.8 (73.0)	22.5 (72.5)
Daily mean °C (°F)	17.3 (63.1)	17.3 (63.1)	17.5 (63.5)	17.3 (63.1)	17.3 (63.1)	16.8 (62.2)	16.2 (61.2)	16.3 (61.3)	16.5 (61.7)	16.8 (62.2)	17.0 (62.6)	17.0 (62.6)	17.0 (62.6)
Mean daily minimum °C (°F)	11.9 (53.4)	12.2 (54.0)	12.4 (54.3)	12.7 (54.9)	13.1 (55.6)	12.6 (54.7)	12.0 (53.6)	11.7 (53.1)	12.0 (53.6)	12.1 (53.8)	12.2 (54.0)	11.9 (53.4)	12.2 (54.0)
Average precipitation mm (inches)	48.4 (1.91)	71.1 (2.80)	80.9 (3.19)	126.4 (4.98)	141.0 (5.55)	103.6 (4.08)	107.6 (4.24)	106.8 (4.20)	115.0 (4.53)	120.6 (4.75)	108.0 (4.25)	75.6 (2.98)	1,204.9 (47.44)
Average precipitation days	14	16	20	22	24	23	24	22	21	24	23	18	250
Average relative humidity (%)	83	84	84	86	86	85	85	85	85	86	86	85	85
Mean monthly sunshine hours	158.1	147.0	124.0	114.0	114.7	99.0	89.9	105.4	84.0	93.0	96.0	170.5	1,395.6
Mean daily sunshine hours	5.1	5.2	4.0	3.8	3.7	3.3	2.9	3.4	2.8	3.0	3.2	5.5	3.8
Source: Instituto de Hidrologia Meteorologia y Estudios Ambientales

== See also ==
- Paez people, indigenous people of the area
- Páez language, language isolate
- Paezan languages, proposed primary language family
