= Violence against Indigenous peoples in Colombia =

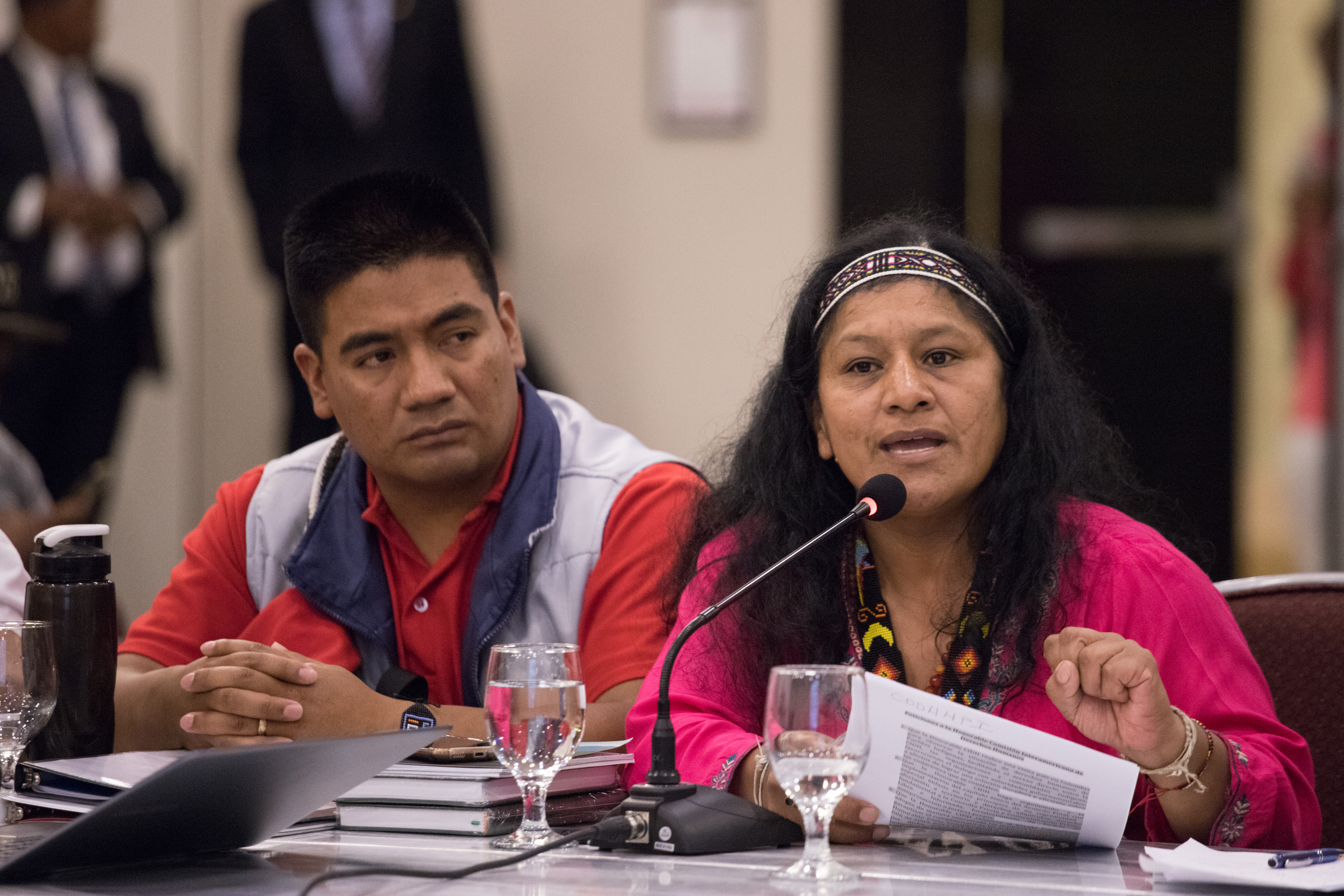
Aida Quilcue speaking on Indigenous rights in the context of peace agreements with the Colombian government.

The Indigenous peoples of Colombia have been subjected to incredible violence in recent decades, ranging from massacres by armed groups to the targeted killings of Indigenous activists and politicians. Mineral, crop and energy resources on native land have been a driving force behind conflicts in Colombia since its founding, and continue to fuel violence against Indigenous peoples into the present day. In the context of the Colombian conflict, the violence against activists is linked to armed groups vying for control in the aftermath of the 2016 peace deal with the Colombian government, leading to a near-complete absence of the state in parts of Colombia. In some areas of Colombia, a motive for killing activists is the belief that they may be working with an opposing armed group. In others, it is because activists support plans to replace cocaine crops with food, and potentially damage the drug economy, or because they support plans to recover land stolen in the conflict.

In 2021, Genocide Watch issued a genocide emergency for all of Colombia, and stated that Indigenous groups are disproportionately effected by violence in rural areas, displacing them from their ancestral lands, which are then used for coca production to finance the activities of armed groups.

== Background ==
Indigenous peoples in Colombia have long been exploited by settlers since the beginning of the Spanish colonization of the Americas. Mines, land and labor remain key issues today in the conflict between Indigenous peoples, armed groups, and the Colombian government.

== History ==
According to a report by the National Commission of Indigenous Territories (CNTI) in October 2022, a member of Colombia's Indigenous population was killed every four days in 2021. The report was released in the wake of mass violence against Indigenous activists in Colombia. The Institute of Development and Peace Studies (INDEPAZ) is a non-profit organization that documents and lists every Indigenous activist, social leader and environmental defender that has been killed. They reported 21 activist deaths in 2016, 208 in 2017, 282 in 2018, 253 in 2019, 91 in 2020, 338 in 2021, 300 in 2022, and 289 in 2023 as of December 4. At least 611 environmental defenders have been killed since the signing of the peace agreement in 2016; of these, 332 were Indigenous, and 204 of the killings took place in Cauca Department. Cauca Department is at the forefront of violence against Indigenous peoples in Colombia, with 40% of Indigenous activists having been killed in Cauca. Half of these activists were also Nasa. Hundreds of threats towards social leaders have been reported.

Since the FARC's peace deal with the Colombian government in 2016, assassinations of Indigenous social leaders have changed; instead of highly visible national politicians, rural activists are now the primary victims of these killings. Most of these killings are conducted by unknown armed forces, FARC dissident groups and state armed forces. Activists are sometimes assigned an agent from the government's National Protection Unit to guide them along a “protection route” and keep them out of harm's way. It can take up to 3 months to complete a plan for an agent to be assigned.

Many Indigenous peoples have also been displaced, be it through government neglect of human rights or armed conflicts in Colombia; approximately 850,353 people have been forced from their territories.

== Groups ==
=== Indigenous Guard ===
The Indigenous Guard (Kiwe Thegnas in the Páez or Nasa Yuwe language) are a group of Indigenous men, women and children in Colombia who volunteer to defend their ancestral lands. The group originated in the violence-ridden Cauca Department and became an organized force in 2001, during a surge in armed conflict. Unarmed, they have confronted various militarized groups in Colombia, such as the FARC, right-wing paramilitaries, and the Colombian army. The Indigenous Guard have stated that their biggest threat comes from the numerous militarized groups of break-off FARC rebels who opposed the 2016 peace deal with the Colombian government. Protecting the environment from illegal gold mining and coca cultivation is now the Guard's main purpose.
