= Belalcázar, Cauca =

Town in Colombia

Belalcázar
- Location in Cauca Department and Colombia Belalcázar (Colombia)
- Coordinates: 2.646°N 75.973°W
- Country: Colombia
- Department: Cauca Department
- Municipality: Páez
- Elevation: 4,760 ft (1,450 m)

Population (2018)
  - Total: 2,898
- Time zone: UTC-5 (Colombia Standard Time)

Belalcázar (Spanish pronunciation: [belalˈkasaɾ]) is a town in Cauca Department in Colombia. It is the seat of the Páez Municipality. The town of Belalcázar had a population of 2,898 in 2018. The town is located in the mountainous northeastern portion of the department, at the foothills of the Cordillera Central. It is about 1,450 meters above sea level with an average temperature of 20°C. Belalcázar is considered to be the main urban center of the Tierradentro region, a UNESCO World Heritage Site. It is between Minuto de Dios and Río Simbalá on National Route 37. Route 37CC02 connects Belalcázar to the town of Honduras. The region is home to large populations of indigenous people, primarily the Paez, Afro-Colombians, and mestizos. The Apostolic Vicariate of Tierradentro, established in 1921 by Pope Benedict XV, is based in the town. It is the only urban area in the municipality.

== Demographics ==
The town had a population of 2,898 at the time of the 2018 census. 1,469 of them were indigenous, 390 were Afro-Colombian, and 1 was Raizal. An additional 1,014 did not identify with any recognized ethnic group, and 242 did not state their ethnicity.
