= Jorge García Isaza =

Jorge García Isaza CM
- Vicar Apostolic of Tierradentro
- Church: Catholic Church
- See: Apostolic Vicariate of Tierradentro
- In office: 5 May 1989 – 23 April 2003
- Predecessor: Germán Garcia Isaza
- Successor: Edgar Hernando Tirado Mazo
- Other post: Titular Bishop of Budua (2000-2016)

Orders
- Ordination: 14 February 1954
- Consecration: 26 March 2000 by Germán Garcia Isaza

Personal details
- Born: 2 July 1928 Manizales, Caldas Department, Colombia
- Died: 16 August 2016 (aged 88)

Jorge García Isaza (2 July 1928 – 16 August 2016) was a Colombian Roman Catholic bishop.

Ordained to the priesthood in 1964, García Isaza served as prefect apostolic of the Apostolic Vicariate of Tierradentro, Colombia, from 2000 to 2003.

== See also ==
- Roman Catholicism in Colombia
