= Heriberto Correa Yepes =

Colombian prelate

Heriberto Correa Yepes, M.X.Y.
- Titular Bishop of Casae Nigrae
- Church: Roman Catholic Church
- See: Titular See of Casae Nigrae
- In office: 1973 - 2010 (his death)
- Predecessor: Michael Patrick Olatunji Fagun
- Successor: Present
- Previous post: Priest

Orders
- Ordination: November 12, 1939
- Consecration: March 27, 1973

Personal details
- Born: August 6, 1916 Cedeño, Colombia
- Died: September 9, 2010 (aged 94) Medellín, Colombia

Heriberto Correa Yepes, M.X.Y. (August 6, 1916 – September 9, 2010) was a Colombian Prelate of Roman Catholic Church. He was born in Cedeño, Colombia and was ordained a priest on November 12, 1939, from the religious order of Misioneros Javerianos de Yarumal. He was appointed as prefect to the Apostolic Vicariate of Mitú, Colombia on March 27, 1953, and he resigned sometime in 1967. He was appointed to Vicar Apostolic of Buenaventura Diocese (Colombia) along with Titular bishop of Casae Nigrae on January 29, 1973, and then ordained bishop on March 27, 1973. He retired as Vicar Apostolic on November 30, 1996.
