= Coca Sek =

Carbonated beverage

Coca Sek is a carbonated beverage that the Páez people of south-western Colombia began producing and selling in December 2005. The drink is based on coca leaves, which native Colombian peoples have been consuming for centuries to adapt to high altitudes and aid in manual labor.

The drink is cider-colored and smells like tea. Its taste is described as a mixture of lemonade and ginger ale.

In May 2007, the government of Colombia forcibly removed Coca Sek from supermarket shelves, although it can still be found in health food stores.
