= Rafael Arcadio Bernal Supelano =

Colombian Roman Catholic bishop (1934–2019)

Rafael Arcadio Bernal Supelano C.Ss.R.
- Bishop of the Roman Catholic Diocese of Libano–Honda
- Diocese: Libano–Honda
- In office: 2003-04

Orders
- Ordination: 1959

Personal details
- Born: November 28, 1934 Zipaquirá, Colombia
- Died: January 11, 2019 (aged 84) Bucaramanga, Colombia
- Denomination: Roman Catholic

Rafael Arcadio Bernal Supelano C.Ss.R. (28 November 1934 – 11 January 2019) was a Colombian Roman Catholic bishop.

== Early life ==
Bernal Supelano was born in Colombia and was ordained to the priesthood in 1959. He served as titular bishop of Amundrasa and as bishop of the Vicariate Apostolic of Sibundoy, Colombia, from 1978 to 1990. He then served as bishop of the Roman Catholic Diocese of Arauca, Colombia, from 1990 to 2003 and as bishop of the Roman Catholic Diocese of Libano–Honda, Colombia, from 2003 to 2004.
