= Nasa people =

Indigenous people in Colombia

Nasa
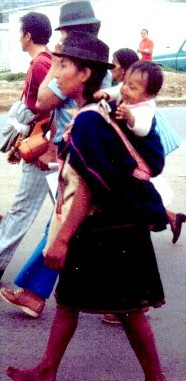
- Nasa merchants, Colombia, 2005

Total population
- 60,000–80,000

Regions with significant populations
- Colombia; Tierradentro

Languages
- Páez, Spanish

Religion
- traditional tribal religion, Roman Catholicism

- People: Nasa (Páez)
- Language: Nasa Yuwe

The Nasa people, also known as the Páez, are a Indigenous people who live in the southwestern highlands of Colombia, especially in the Cauca Department, but also the Caquetá Department lowlands and Tierradentro.

== Religion ==
In the early 1900s, Lazarists built missions among the Nasa and began the work to convert them to Christianity. Jesuits had originally tried to convert the Nasa, but failed. However, the Lazarists met some success. The Nasa developed a syncretic form of Roman Catholicism that absorbed their Indigenous religion. For example, the Nasa have shamans but many have also become Roman Catholic priests.

== Climate adaptation ==
Since they live in the cold climate of the Andes, the Nasa build their homes using brick, metal, cement, and wood. Nasa women raise and shear sheep for wool. They clean the wool, spin yarn from it, dye it and knit clothes and blankets for their families.

== Punishment ==
Punishment for wrongs is strict in the Nasa culture. In June 2000, the Nasa whipped local governor Ermes Taqninaf and his mistress Rubiela Yetacue 17 strokes with a knotted leather whip in the town of Santander de Quilichao. "As a Paez Indian", Taqninaf said, "I'm proud to have received this punishment because it is glorifying my race." Stripping the one being punished of his clothing and dunking him in a cold mountain lake is another form of punishment—this was done to Senator Jesús Pinacue in 1998, a Nasa who defied the community by supporting a political candidate in a presidential vote.

== Economy ==
Many Nasa are agriculturists and common crops grown include potatoes, coffee, cassava, plantains, coca, and hemp.

== Present day ==
The Nasa people have been targeted by both rebels and paramilitary groups in the Colombian conflict. In 2019 alone, 36 members of the tribe were murdered, and in July 2019 there were a reported 57 attacks on the Nasa and other Indigenous groups in Colombia. In October 2020, Indigenous groups rallied in the Colombian capital, Bogotá, to protest an increase in violence in their territories.

== See also ==
- Álvaro Ulcué Chocué (1943–1984)
- Coca Sek
- Gaitana
- Páez, Cauca
- Paez language
