= Diocese of Arauca =

Diocese of the Catholic Church in Colombia

Coordinates: 7°05′25″N 70°45′42″W

Diocese of Arauca Dioecesis Araucensis

Catholic

Location
- Country: Colombia
- Ecclesiastical province: Nueva Pamplona

Statistics
- Area: 14,480 km^{2} (5,590 sq mi)
- Population: Total; Catholics: (as of 2004); 262,000; 232,000 (88.5%)

Information
- Rite: Latin Rite
- Established: 26 May 1915 (111 years ago)
- Cathedral: Catedral Santa Bárbara

Current leadership
- Pope: Leo XIV
- Bishop: Jaime Cristóbal Abril González

Map

Website
- www.diocesisdearauca.org

The Roman Catholic Diocese of Arauca (Latin: Araucensis) is a diocese located in the city of Arauca in the ecclesiastical province of Nueva Pamplona in Colombia.

== History ==
- 26 May 1915: Established as Apostolic Prefecture of Arauca from the Apostolic Vicariate of Casanare
- 11 November 1970: Promoted as Apostolic Vicariate of Arauca
- 19 July 1984: Promoted as Diocese of Arauca

== Leadership ==
Prefects Apostolic of Arauca

- Emilio Larquère, C.M. (January 1916 – 9 November 1923)
- Giuseppe Potier, C.M. (1924.05.07 – 1950)
- Graziano Martínez, C.M. (27 October 1950 – 1956)

Vicars Apostolic of Arauca

- Jesús Emilio Jaramillo Monsalve, M.X.Y. (11 November 1970 – 19 July 1984)

Bishops of Arauca

- Rafael Arcadio Bernal Supelano, C.Ss.R. (29 March 1990 – 10 January 2003)
- Carlos Germán Mesa Ruiz (20 March 2003 – 22 March 2010)
- Jaime Muñoz Pedroza (4 December 2010 – 11 July 2018)
- Jaime Cristóbal Abril González (18 November 2019 – present)

== See also ==
- Roman Catholicism in Colombia
