= Roberto Vicentini =

Italian Roman Catholic prelate (1878–1953)

Roberto Vicentini (30 June 1878 – 10 October 1953) was an Italian prelate of the Catholic Church who spent his career in the Roman Curia. He also worked in the diplomatic service of the Holy See from 1921 to 1924.

== Biography ==
Roberto Vicentini was born on 30 June 1878 in L'Aquila, Italy. He taught at the Pontifical Lateran University.

He held positions in the Tribunal of the Roman Rota, as substitute beginning 2 August 1910 and as promoter of justice beginning 20 December 1915.

On 3 May 1921, Pope Benedict XV named him Apostolic Internuncio to the Netherlands and titular archbishop of Helenopolis in Palaestina. He received his episcopal consecration on 19 May 1921 from Cardinal Pietro Gasparri.

On 2 May 1922, he was appointed Apostolic Nuncio to Colombia. He resigned from that post on 28 October 1924.

On 14 December 1925, Pope Pius XI gave him the title Patriarch of Antioch, becoming the last Latin bishop to hold the title. The post remained vacant from his death until it was suppressed in 1964.

He also became vicar of St. Peter's Basilica, which gave him a prominent role in the funeral of Pius XI and the inauguration of Pius XII, especially in the latter since he substituted for the archpriest of the basilica, a post that had just been vacated by the new pope.

Vicentini died in Vatican City on 10 October 1953 at the age of 75.
