= Yarumal Missionaries =

Colombian Catholic missionary society

- Misioneros Javerianos de Yarumal
- Abbreviation: M.X.Y. / I.M.E.Y.
- Formation: 3 July 1927
- Founder: Miguel Ángel Builes
- Founded at: Yarumal, Antioquia, Colombia
- Type: Society of apostolic life
- Headquarters: Medellín, Colombia
- Superior General: Germán Mazo Mazo, M.X.Y.
- Parent organization: Catholic Church

The Yarumal Missionaries, officially the Institute of the Foreign Missions of Yarumal (Latin: Institutum Yarumalense pro Missionibus ad Exteras Gentes; Spanish: Misioneros Javerianos de Yarumal), also known as the Yarumal Missionaries or Misioneros de Yarumal, are a Society of apostolic life of pontifical right for men in the Catholic Church. The institute was founded in Yarumal, Antioquia, Colombia, on 3 July 1927 by Miguel Ángel Builes, then bishop of Santa Rosa de Osos.

The missionaries are dedicated to missionary work, particularly among poor and marginalized communities. The institute prepares and sends priests, brothers and lay missionaries to countries in the Americas, Africa and Asia, where its activities include evangelization and the development of local Christian communities, as well as programs related to education, health, housing and community development.

== History ==
The origins of the institute lie in the missionary concerns of Miguel Ángel Builes, bishop of Santa Rosa de Osos. Following the First National Missionary Congress held in Bogotá in 1924, Builes developed the idea of establishing a seminary dedicated to the formation of missionaries. On 29 June 1927 he issued the decree establishing the Seminary of Foreign Missions of Yarumal. The seminary formally began its activities on 3 July 1927 in a former travelers' inn known as Contento on the outskirts of Yarumal.

The first community consisted of three priests—Abigail Restrepo, Alfonso Restrepo and Pedro Luis Osorio—and five students. The early institution operated with very limited material resources and depended heavily on the support of Builes and local benefactors.

The institute's official name became the Institute of the Foreign Missions of Yarumal (IMEY), while its members became commonly known as the Yarumal Missionaries or Xaverian Missionaries of Yarumal. The initials M.X.Y. are used by members of the institute.

The institute's missionary activity later expanded beyond Colombia. According to its own account, Yarumal missionaries have worked in countries in the Americas, Africa and Asia, with the institute describing its mission as service to peoples living in difficult circumstances and communities with limited access to clergy.

== Mission and activities ==
The institute has also participated in Catholic missionary work involving indigenous communities in Colombia. In 2010, the ethnic section of the Colombian Bishops' Conference reported on the missionary work of indigenous priests and called for an approach to evangelization that respected indigenous spirituality and cultural traditions. The meeting took place in the context of the Colombian bishops' missionary commission, whose president at the time was Edgar Hernando Tirado Mazo, a member of the Yarumal Missionaries.

The statement associated with the meeting advocated a pluralist society open to intercultural dialogue and called for greater recognition of indigenous cultures within Catholic pastoral work.

== Organization ==
The Yarumal Missionaries are classified as a male Society of Apostolic Life and are of pontifical right. Their Latin designation is Institutum Yarumalense pro Missionibus ad Exteras Gentes. The institute depends on the Dicastery for Evangelization.

The institute's headquarters are in Medellín, Colombia.

The institute is governed by a superior general. Germán Mazo Mazo, M.X.Y., is listed as superior general from 2020 onward by GCatholic.

== Statistics ==
Catholic-Hierarchy records the following historical statistics for the institute. In 1966 it recorded 130 religious priests and 187 male religious; in 2004, 181 priests and 239 male religious in 66 houses. In 2022 it recorded 140 religious priests, 169 male religious and 47 houses.

Year	Religious priests	Male religious	Houses
1966	130	187	5
1971	130	176	50
1986	131	200	44
1995	187	256	57
2004	181	239	66
2010	156	217	70
2014	164	202	66
2017	150	178	45
2020	140	170	47
2022	140	169	47

== Notable members ==
Among the institute's members have been several Catholic bishops and missionaries, including Jesús Emilio Jaramillo Monsalve, who served as bishop of Arauca and was later recognized as a martyr and beatified; Gerardo Valencia Cano, a missionary bishop and apostolic vicar of Buenaventura; and Heriberto Correa Yepes, who served as apostolic vicar of Buenaventura.

Other members have served as apostolic vicars and bishops in Colombian mission territories. Catholic-Hierarchy lists, among the institute's affiliated members, José Gustavo Ángel Ramírez, Antonio Bayter Abud, Jaime Enrique Duque Correa, Joselito Carreño Quiñonez and Medardo de Jesús Henao del Río.
