= Misak people =

Indigenous people of the department of Cauca in Colombia

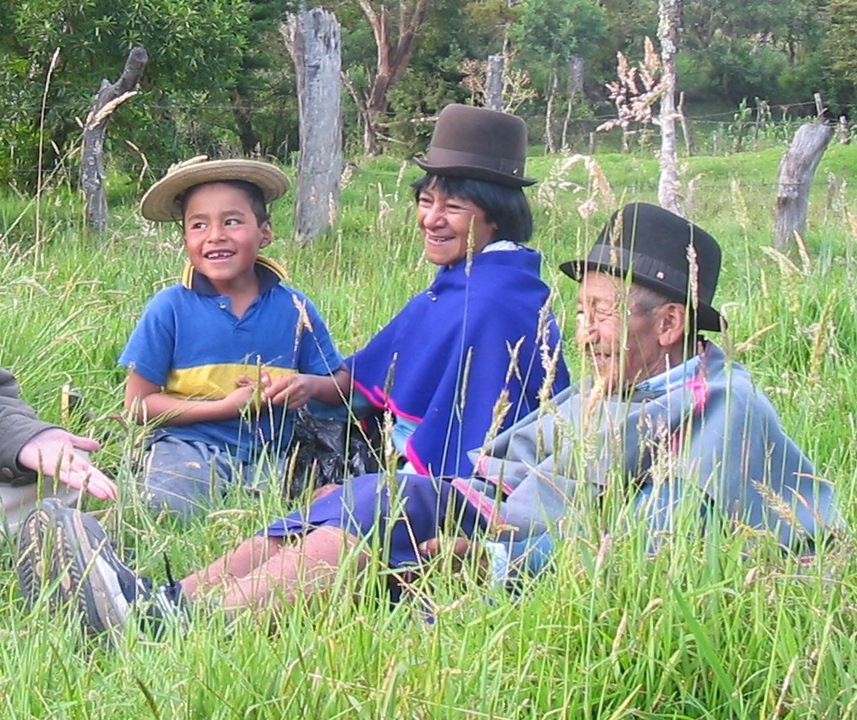
Guambia, Colombia

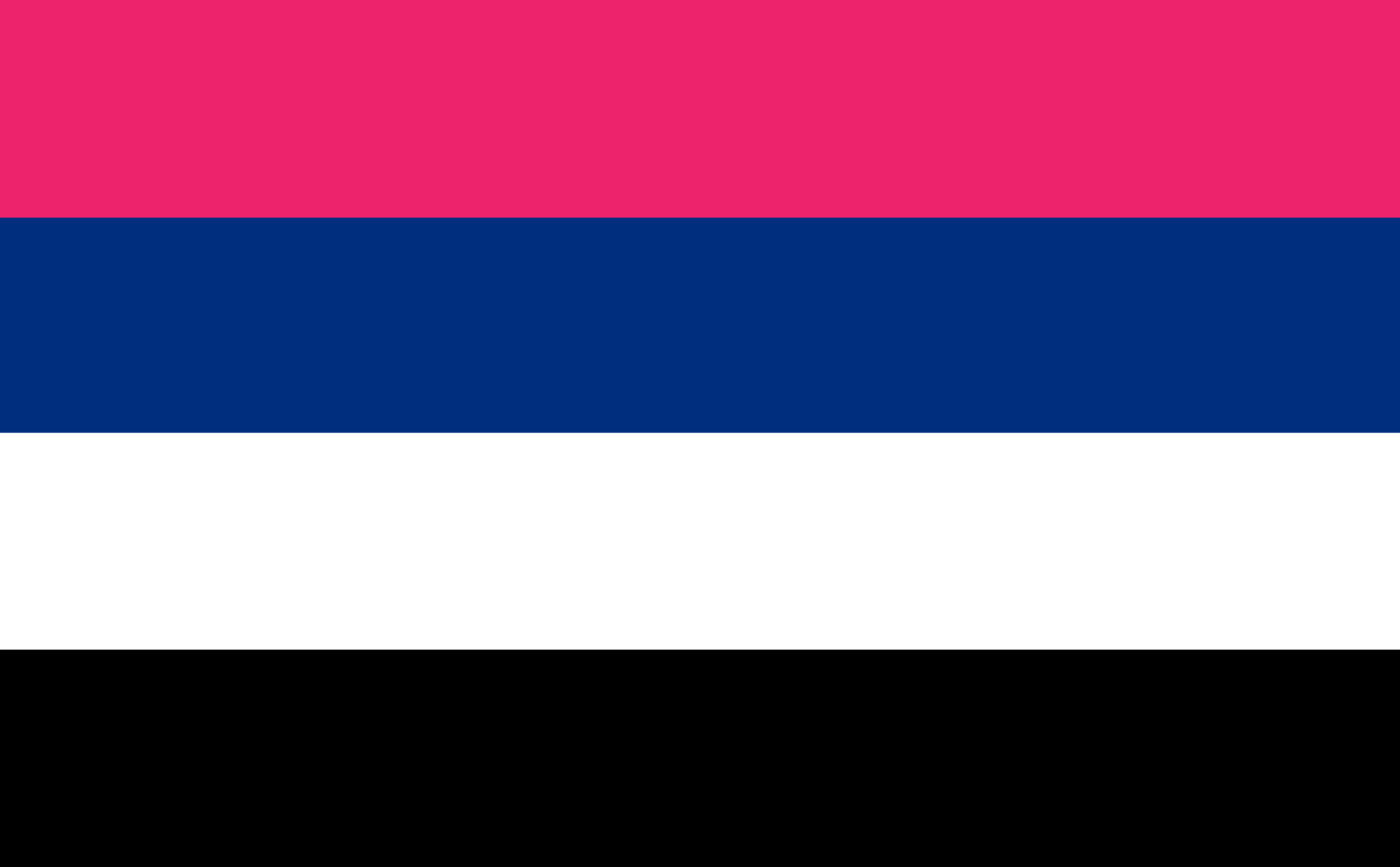
Flag

The Misak or Guambiano are an indigenous people of the department of Cauca in Colombia. Their language is known as Guambiano and is one of the Coconucan languages. The majority lives in the western part of the Colombian Andes range (Cordillera). Some Guambiano can also be found in Huila Department.

The Misak society has a patriarchal kinship system, with hereditary offices, descent lines, and property passing through the male line. Agriculture is the base of their economy. Wheat, corn, coffee, onions, garlic, cassava, potatoes, beans, and cabbage are among the main products they cultivate.

The Misak people are known for their traditional clothing: blue scarf (worn as a sarong), rectangular ponchos, and black bowler hat for the men; black skirt, solid color top, blue scarf, and dark bowler hat for the women.

== Notable people ==
- Bárbara Muelas (born 1945), language activist and academic
- Lorenzo Muelas (born 1938), indigenous activist and politician
