= Caldono, Cauca =

Coordinates: 2°48′N 76°32′W

- Municipality and town
- Flag Coat of arms
- Interactive map of Caldono, Cauca
- Country: Colombia
- Department: Cauca Department

Population (2020 est.)
  - Total: 34,348
- Time zone: UTC-5 (Colombia Standard Time)
- Climate: Am

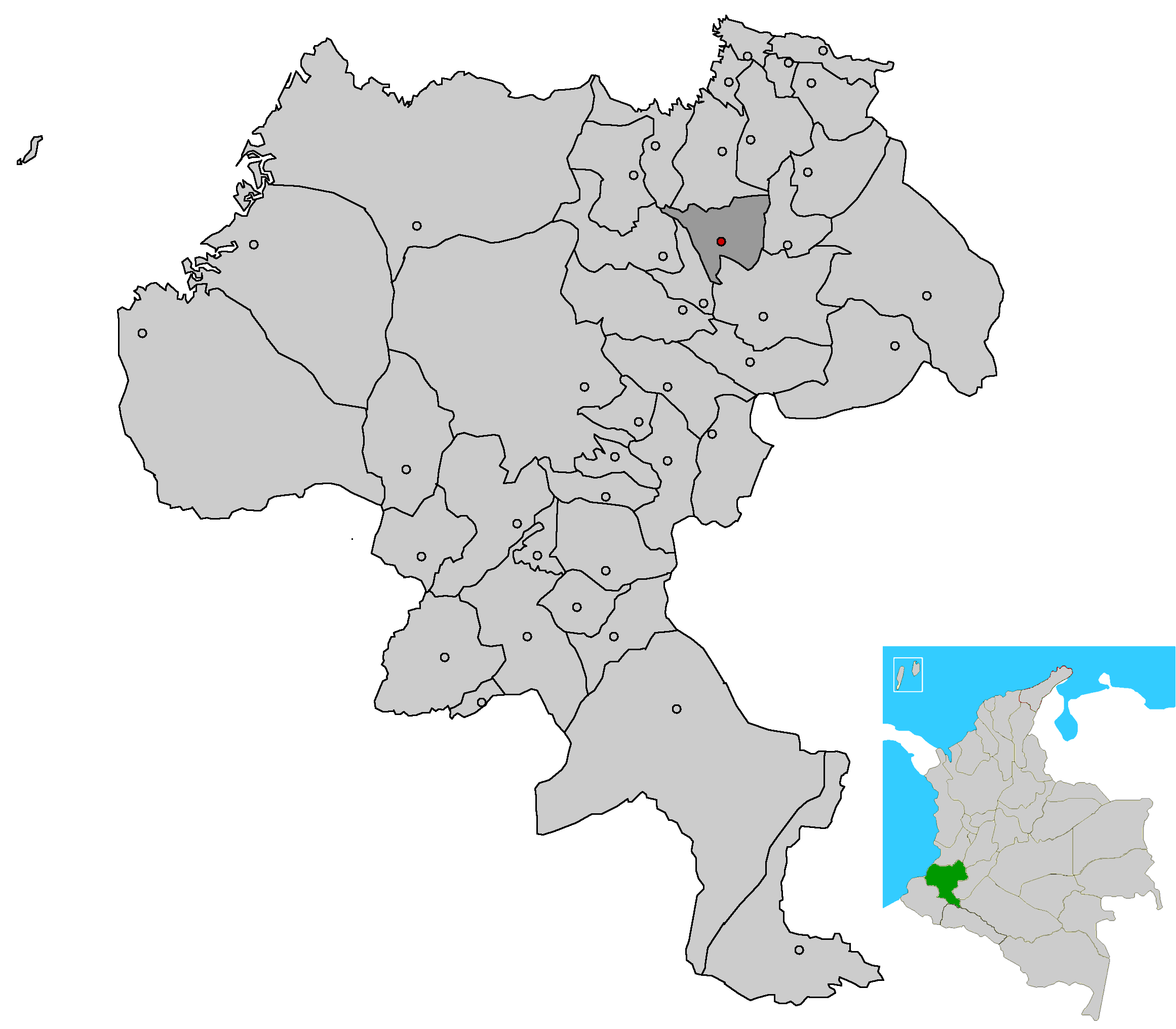
Location of the town and municipality of Caldono in the Cauca Department.

Caldono is a town and municipality in the Cauca Department, Colombia.
