= Toribío, Cauca =

Toribío
- Municipality and town
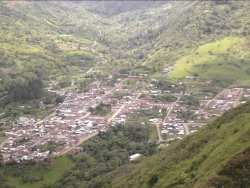
- View of Toribío

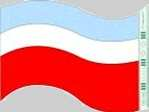
- Flag Coat of arms

- Location of the municipality and town of Toribío in the Cauca Department of Colombia
- Coordinates: 2°57′29″N 76°16′17″W
- Country: Colombia
- Department: Cauca Department

Area
  - Total: 399 km^{2} (154 sq mi)
- Elevation: 1,701 m (5,581 ft)

Population (Census 2018)
  - Total: 30,654
- Time zone: UTC-5 (Colombia Standard Time)
- Climate: Am

Toribío is a town and municipality in Cauca Department, Colombia. It is located at around 2°57′29″N 76°16′17″W, in the elevation of about 2000 m.
