= Páez River =

Páez River Río Páez
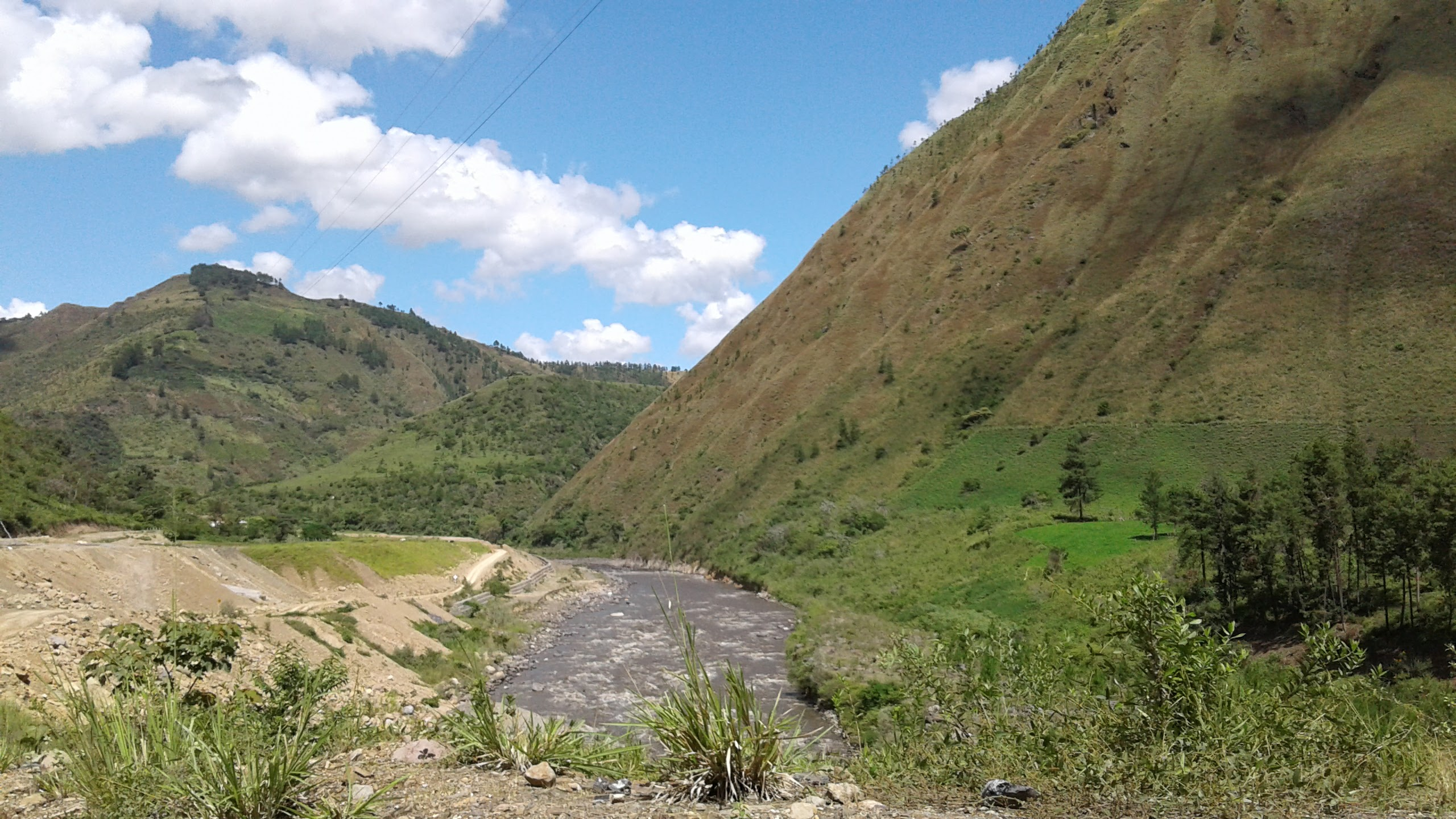

Location
- Country: Colombia
- Department: Huila

Physical characteristics
- Mouth: Magdalena River
  - location: Remolino del Vicho
  - coordinates: 2°27′31″N 75°34′23″W

The Páez River (Río Páez Spanish pronunciation: [ˈri.o ˈpaes]) is a river in southwestern Colombia. It is a tributary of the Magdalena River which drains into the Caribbean Sea. It flows into the Magdalena just south of the village of Remolino del Vicho.

== Earthquake ==
On 6 June 1994, a 6.4 magnitude earthquake stuck in the Páez River area causing extensive landsliding and resulting in over 1,100 dead and the displacement of almost the entire population of 15 municipalities in the departments of Cauca and Huila. Six bridges and over 100 kilometres (62 mi) of roads were destroyed by the landslides. In order to spur development in the Paez River region, Colombia Law 218 of 1995 was passed that granted exemptions on income tax for 10 years for investments made in the departments of Cauca and Huila.

== See also ==
- List of rivers of Colombia
