= Silvia, Cauca =

Coordinates: 2°37′N 76°23′W

- Municipality and town
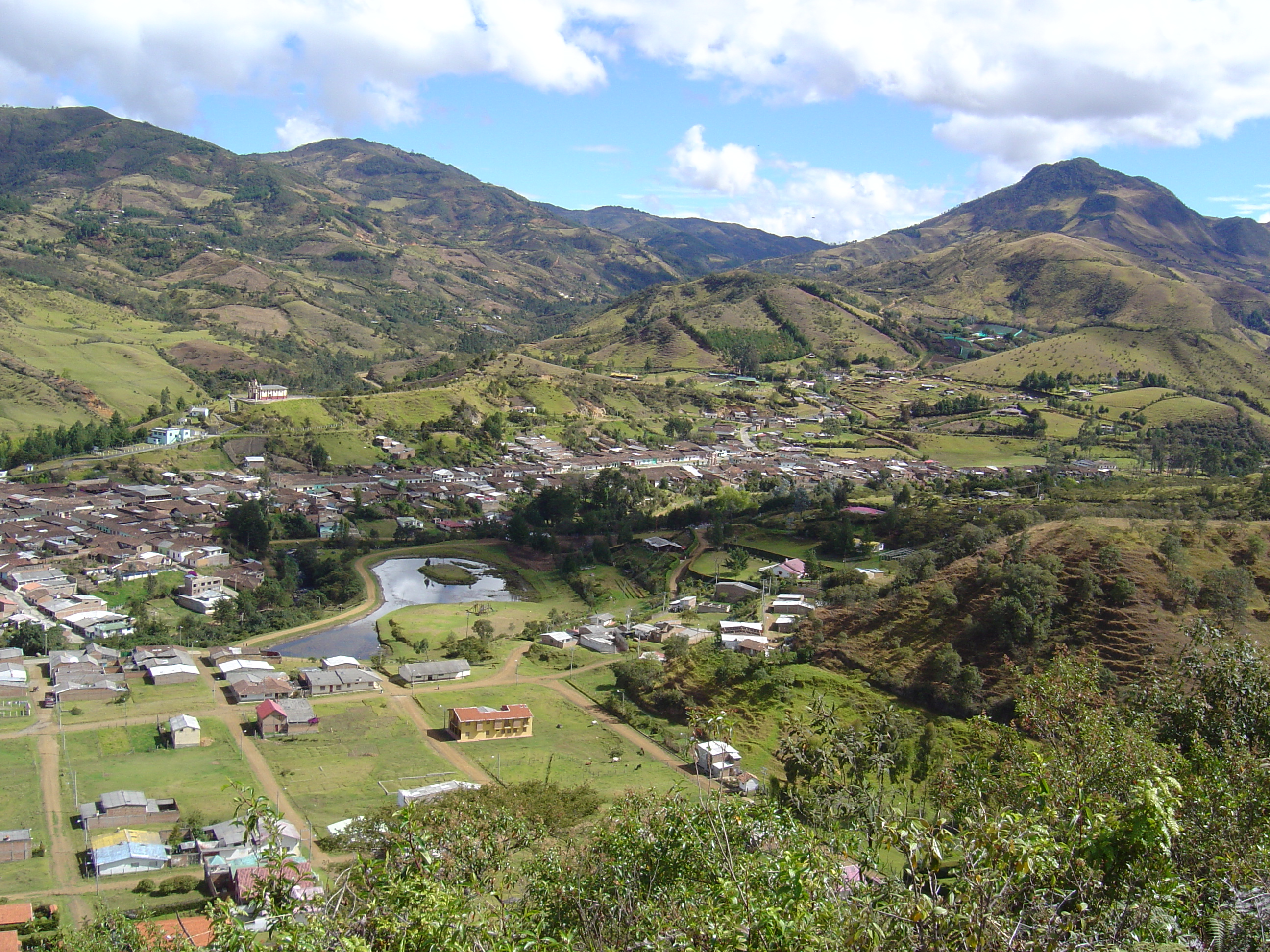
- View of Silvia

- Flag Coat of arms

- Location of the municipality and town of Silvia, Cauca in the Cauca Department of Colombia.
- Country: Colombia
- Department: Cauca Department

Government
  - Mayor: Mercedes Tunubulá
- Elevation: 2,800 m (9,200 ft)

Population (2020 est.)
  - Total: 32,769
- Time zone: UTC-5 (Colombia Standard Time)
- Climate: Csb

Silvia is a town and municipality in the Cauca Department, Colombia. It is often visited as a weekend getaway by residents of Cali, which has a much hotter climate. The area is populated by many people of Guambiano descent, who maintain their traditional ways of life in the area surrounding Silvia.

There are many fine bakeries and inexpensive restaurants in town, most within half a kilometer of the large public square. In the last decade, the large trees that formerly grew on the square were removed due to damages their roots were causing, and the square was renovated to include more seating, and replanted with a greater variety of vegetation.

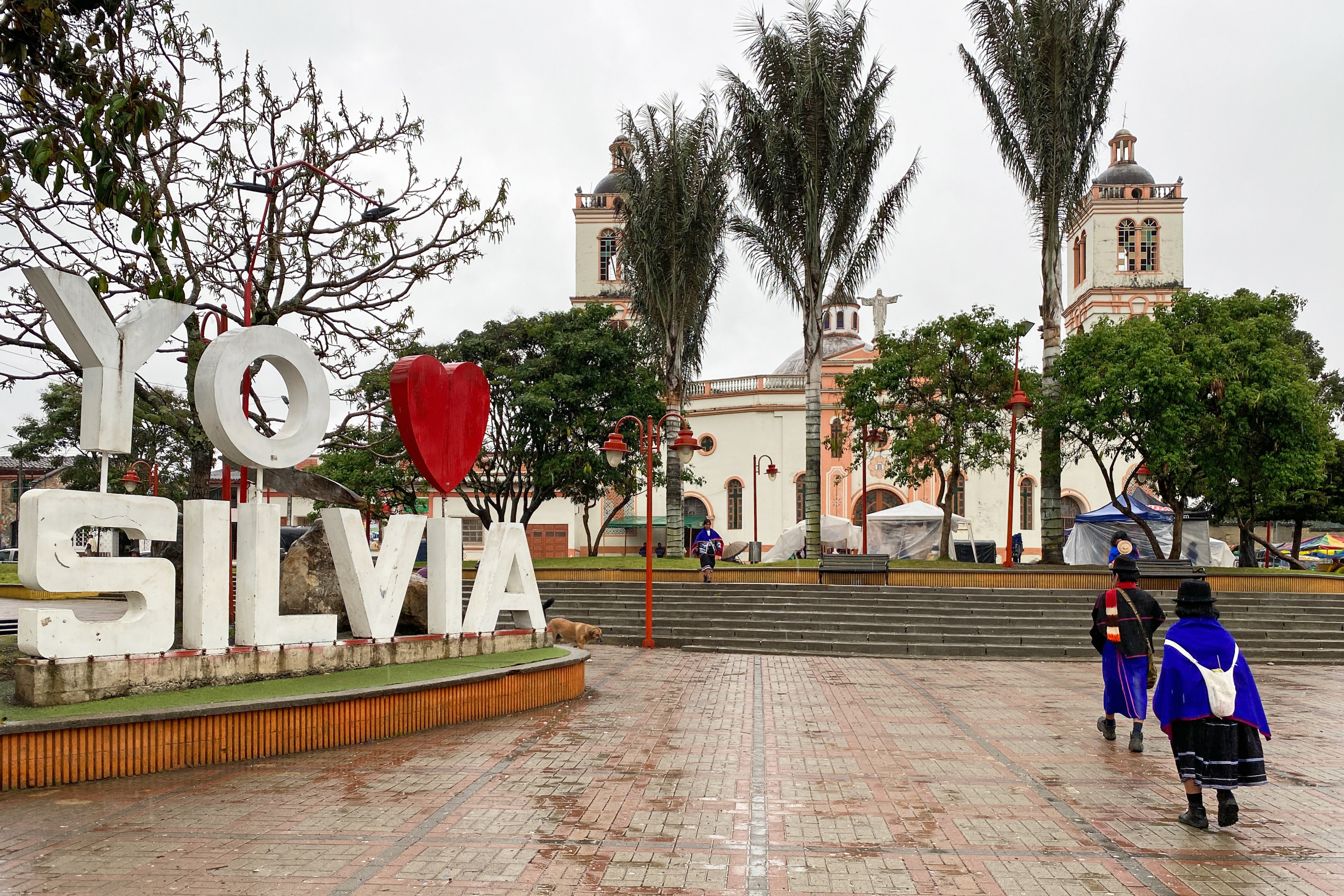
Main park

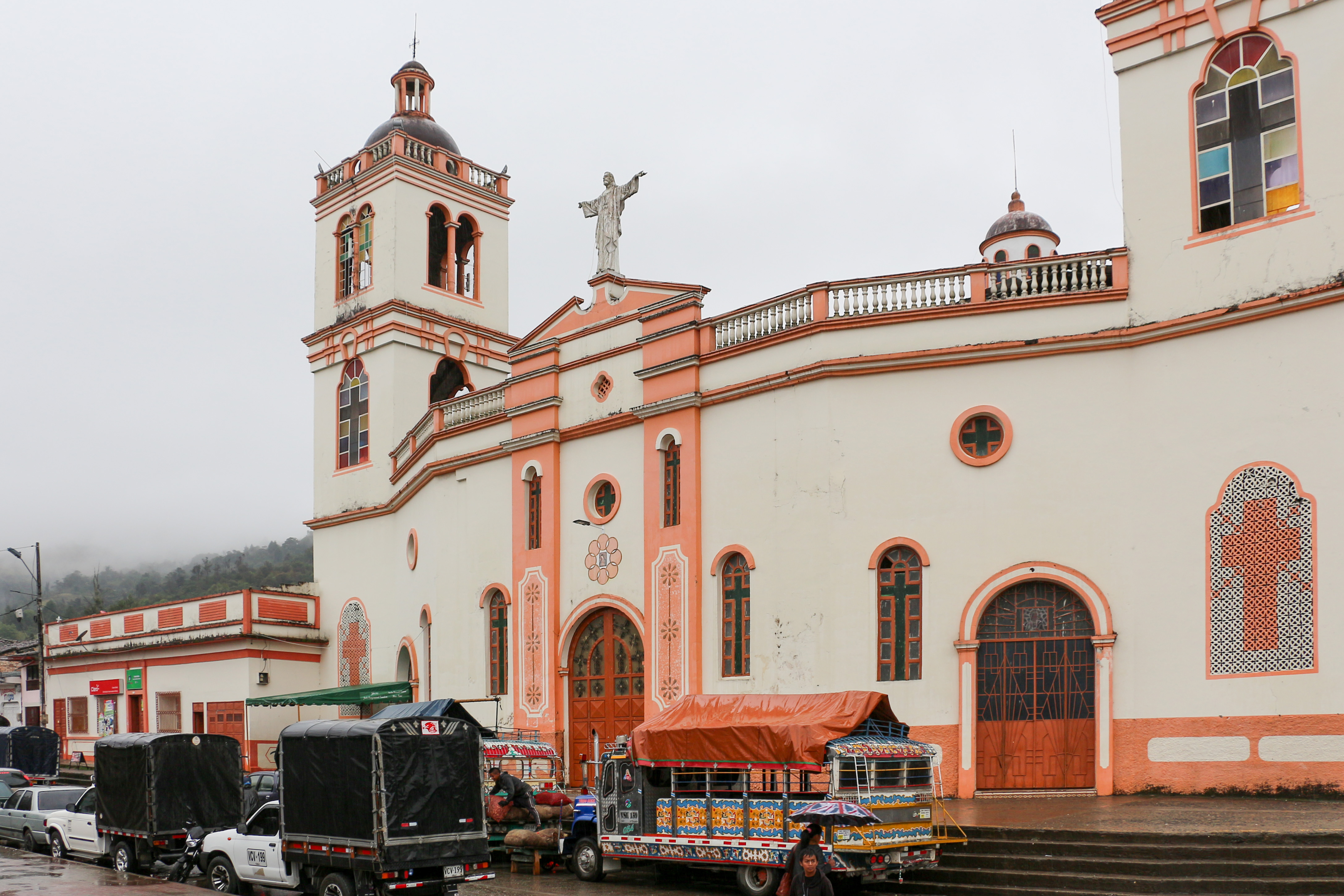
Our Lady of Perpetual Help Church

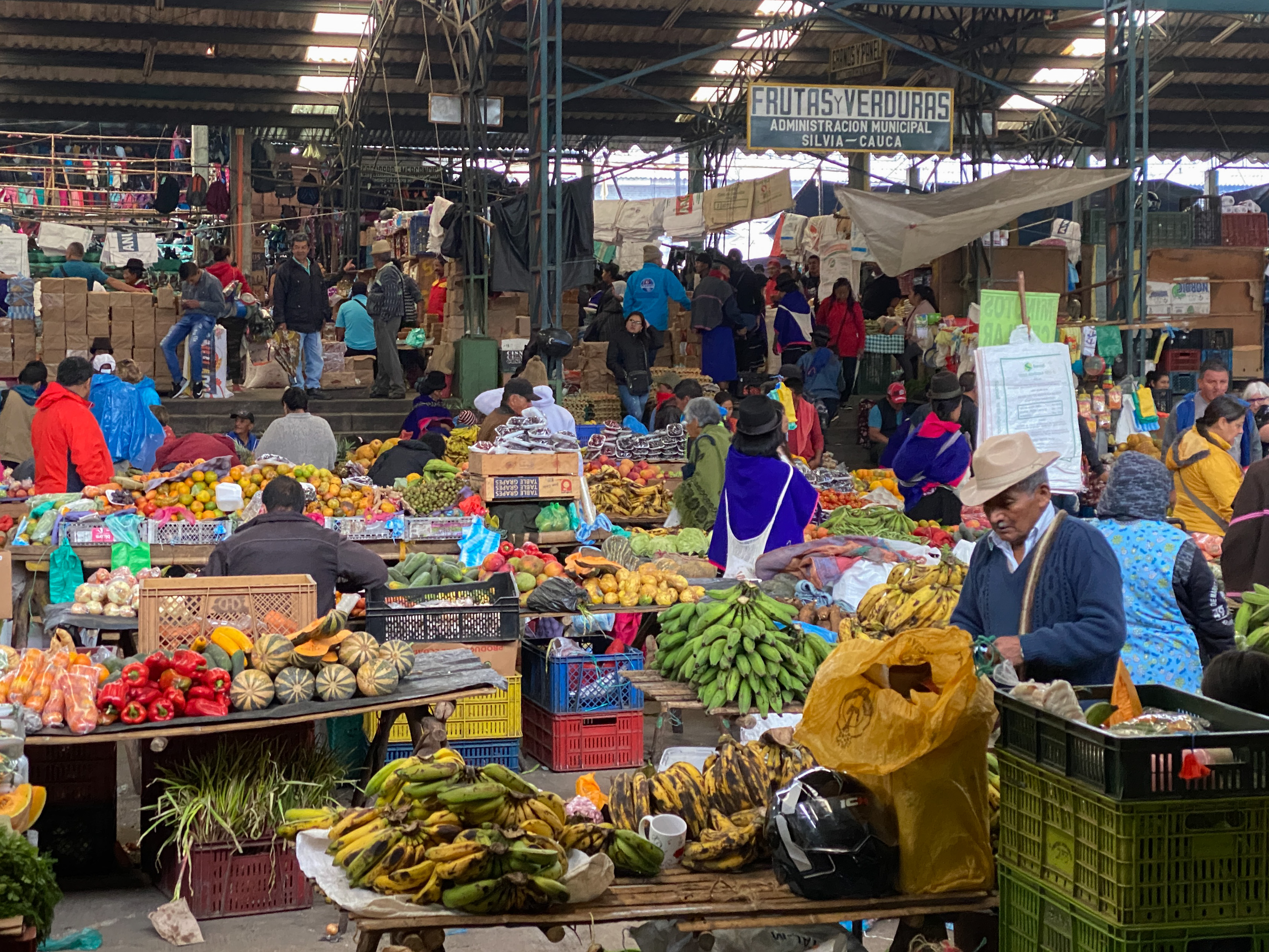
Silvia Market

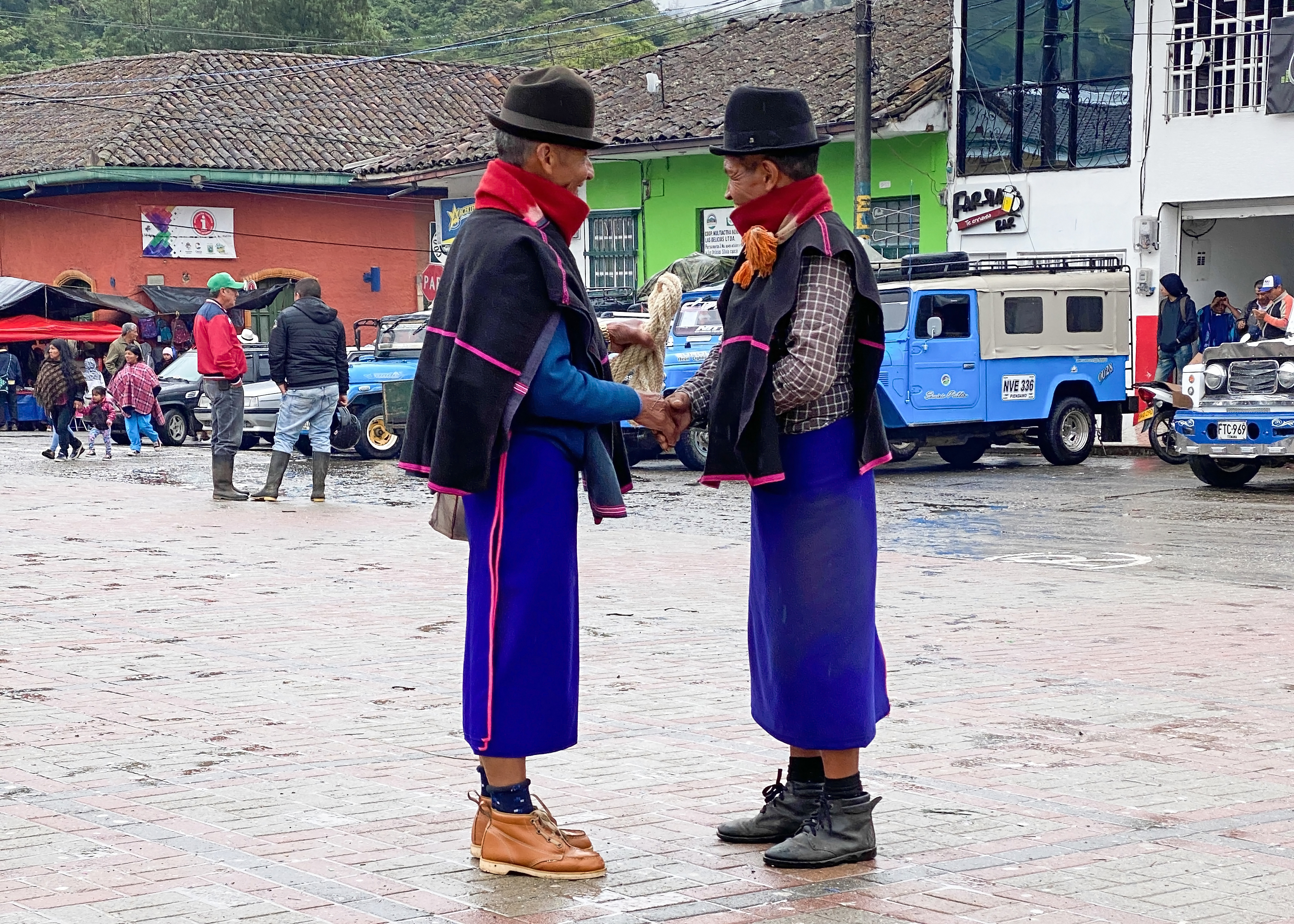
Guambiano people in Silvia
