= Santander de Quilichao =

- City
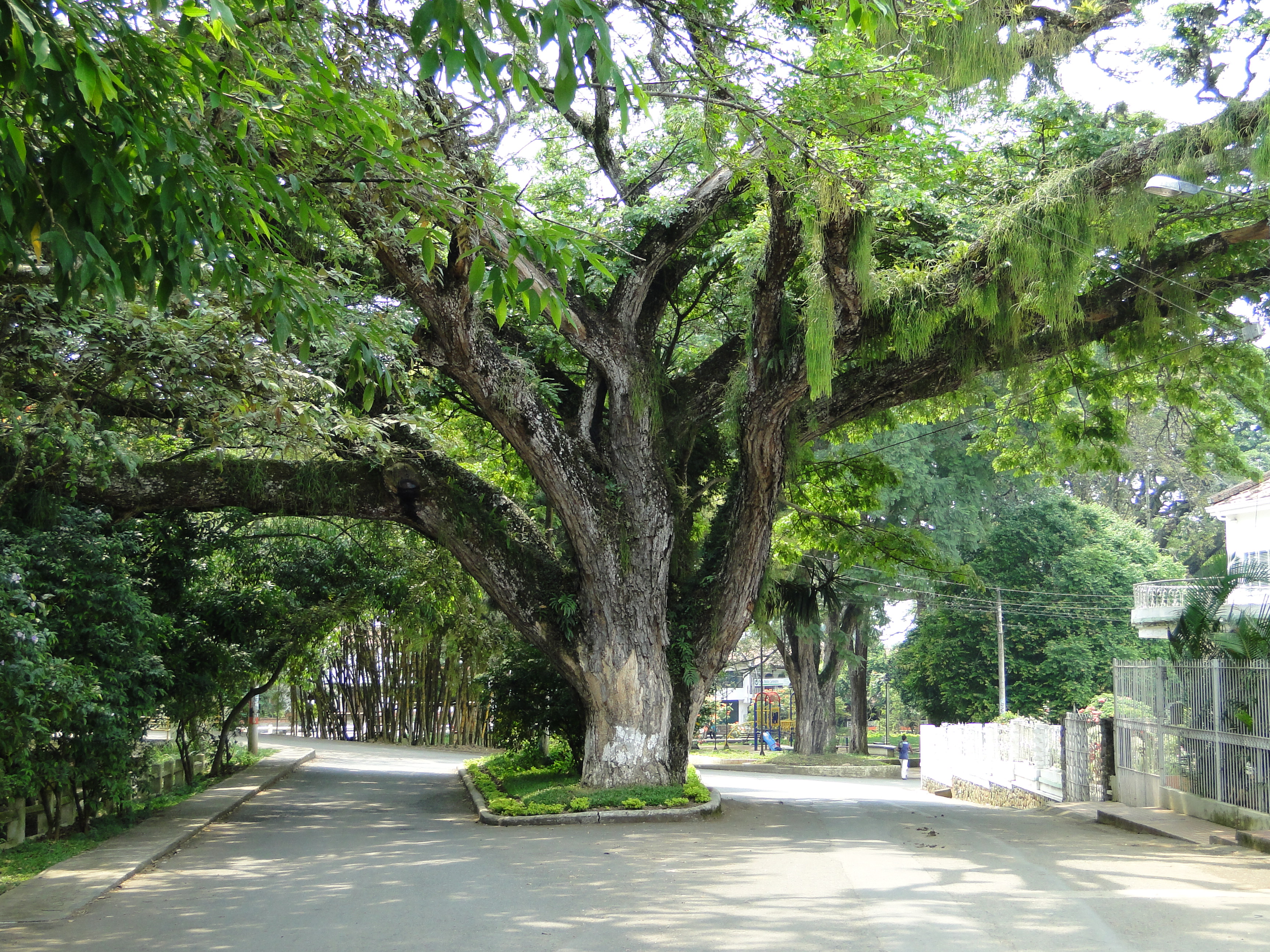
- Saman tree

- Flag Coat of arms
- Nickname: City of the Samanes
- Location of the city Santander de Quilichao.

- Location in Colombia
- Coordinates: 3°00′47″N 76°19′12″W
- Country: Colombia
- Department: Cauca Department
- Founded: July 16, 1543

Government
  - Mayor: Luís Eduardo Grijalba

Area
  - City: 518.2 km^{2} (200.1 sq mi)
  - Urban: 10.880 km^{2} (4.201 sq mi)
- Elevation: 1,071 m (3,514 ft)

Population (2023)
  - City: 220,000
  - Density: 420/km^{2} (1,100/sq mi)
  - Urban: 180,000
  - Urban density: 17,000/km^{2} (43,000/sq mi)
  - Metro: 180,000
- Demonym: Quilichagüeño
- Time zone: UTC-5 (Colombia Standard Time)
- Area code: 57 + 2
- Climate: Af
- Website: Official website (in Spanish)

Santander de Quilichao is a city in the north of the Cauca Department, Colombia at 97 km to the north of Popayán and 45 km to the south of Cali.

== Climate ==
Climate data for Santander de Quilichao (Japio), elevation 1,015 m (3,330 ft), (1981–2010)
Month	Jan	Feb	Mar	Apr	May	Jun	Jul	Aug	Sep	Oct	Nov	Dec	Year
Mean daily maximum °C (°F)	29.0 (84.2)	29.2 (84.6)	29.3 (84.7)	28.9 (84.0)	28.6 (83.5)	28.8 (83.8)	29.4 (84.9)	30.2 (86.4)	29.5 (85.1)	28.7 (83.7)	28.2 (82.8)	28.5 (83.3)	29.0 (84.2)
Daily mean °C (°F)	23.5 (74.3)	23.7 (74.7)	23.6 (74.5)	23.5 (74.3)	23.4 (74.1)	23.5 (74.3)	23.6 (74.5)	24.1 (75.4)	23.8 (74.8)	23.3 (73.9)	23.1 (73.6)	23.4 (74.1)	23.6 (74.5)
Mean daily minimum °C (°F)	18.5 (65.3)	18.5 (65.3)	18.7 (65.7)	18.8 (65.8)	18.7 (65.7)	18.3 (64.9)	17.5 (63.5)	17.5 (63.5)	18.0 (64.4)	18.4 (65.1)	18.6 (65.5)	18.7 (65.7)	18.3 (64.9)
Average precipitation mm (inches)	147.7 (5.81)	141.2 (5.56)	180.7 (7.11)	224.4 (8.83)	159.8 (6.29)	93.3 (3.67)	51.1 (2.01)	67.4 (2.65)	113.0 (4.45)	212.0 (8.35)	228.4 (8.99)	167.1 (6.58)	1,786.2 (70.32)
Average precipitation days	12	11	14	16	13	10	7	6	11	16	16	13	145
Average relative humidity (%)	78	78	78	80	80	79	75	72	75	79	80	79	78
Source: Instituto de Hidrologia Meteorologia y Estudios Ambientales
