= List of ethnic groups in Brazil =

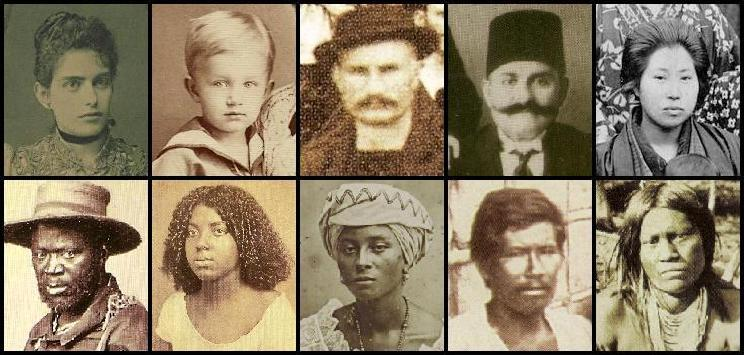
Brazilians of varied backgrounds and physical appearances.

Brazil is one of the most ethnically diverse countries in the world, with cultures and identities that stem from Amerindians, Africans, Europeans and the different mixes between them. As well as the many different diasporas from around the world that moved to Brazil during the 19th and 20th century, more popularly the Japanese, German, Lebanese and Italian ones.

== Ethnoracial groups ==
The type of ethnic classification system used in the Brazilian census is the ethnoracial classification, which are based on self-identification and phenotypical characteristics such as skin color, hair texture and perceived social "race". These groups tend to not correlate with genetic composition, cultural lines or scientific definitions, as the existence of separate races in homo sapiens is largely rejected by geneticists.

Group	Total population (2022)	Percentage of population (2022)	Distribution
Pardos	92,083,286	45.3%	Entire national territory, more numerous in the North and Northeast of the country
Brancos	88,252,121	43.5%	Entire national territory, more numerous in the South and Southeast of the country
Pretos	20,656,458	10.2%	Entire national territory, more numerous in the Northeast and Southeast of the country
Amarelos	850,130	0.4%	Entire national territory, more numerous in the Southeast of the country
Indígenas	1,227,642	0.6%	Entire national territory, more numerous in the North of the country

== Pre-Cabralian groups ==
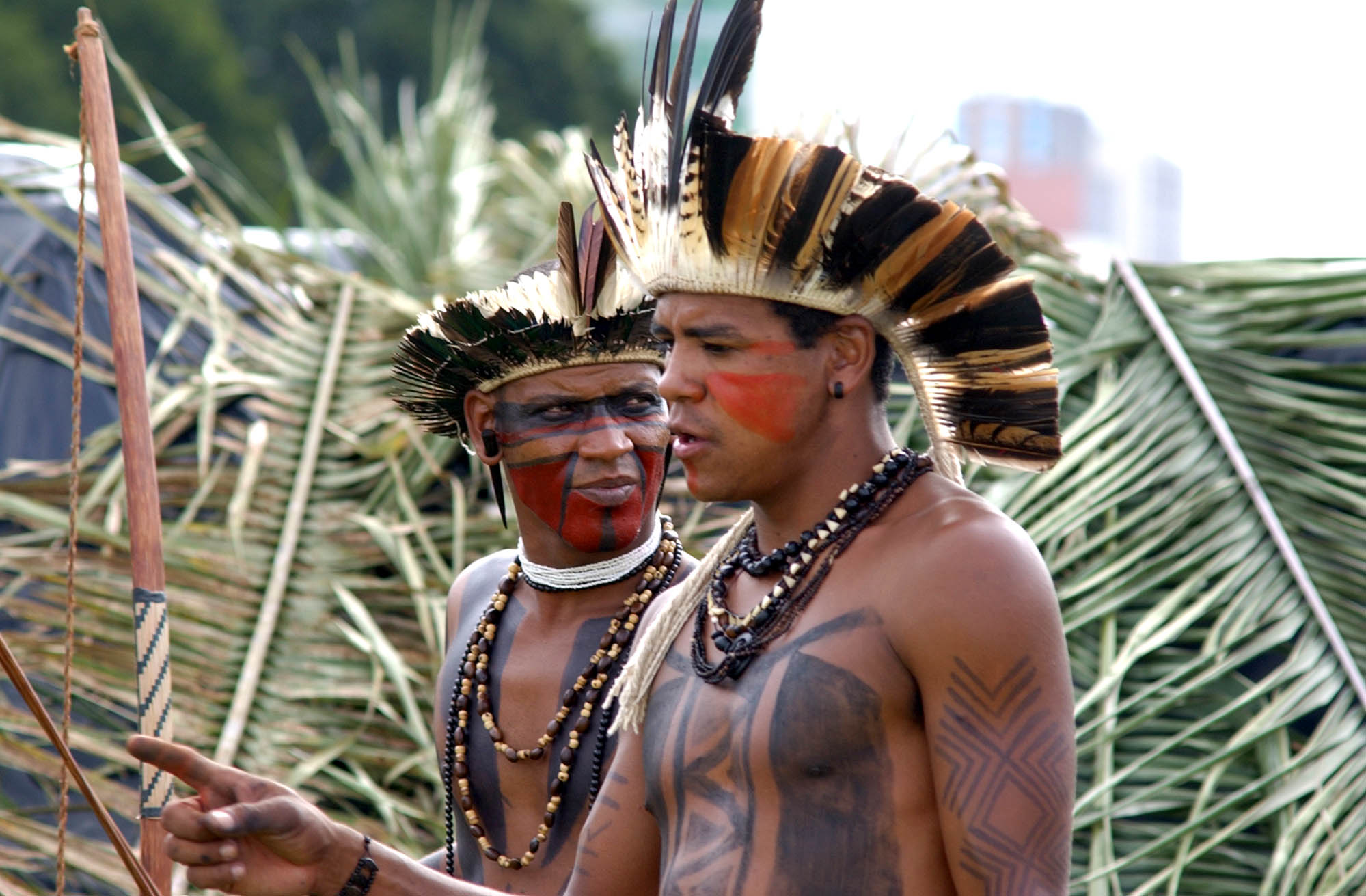
Men of the Pataxó ethnicity, 2006.

The "pre-Cabralian" peoples are the populations that already resided in the territory that would later become Brazil before the arrival of Pedro Álvares Cabral in the South American coast and the beginning of the Portuguese colonization process. The people were Amerindians, descendants of the first settlers of the Americas, who entered the continent coming from Siberia roughly 20 to 25 thousand years ago.

Many indigenous ethnic groups that lived in Brazil prior to 1500 no longer exist, as their populations plummeted and died out due to the diseases brought by the European colonizers from the old world or due to massacres, war, colonial frontier conflicts, slaver raids and other means of aggression and genocide committed against the Amerindian peoples through the centuries. As a result, the ethnic groups shown in the least below are only part of the total ethnic diversity present in Brazil before the modern era. Many of the peoples were assimilated and stripped of their original languages and religions.

Name	Other names	Population	Distribution	Language	Year of Population data
Aikanã	Massacá, Tubarão, Columbiara, Mundé, Mondé, Huari, Aikaná	350	Rondônia	Aikanã	2014
Aikewara	Akewara, Akewere, Suruí, Sororos	470	Pará	Suruí do Pará	2020
Akuntsu	Akunt'su	3	Rondônia	Akuntsu	2022
Amanayé	Amanaié, Amanyé, Araradeua	174	Pará	Amanayé*	2017
Amondawa	Amondaua, Amundava, Amundawa, Uru-Eu-Wau-Wau, Mbo'uima'ga, Envuga	129	Acre, Rondônia	Southern Kagwahiva (Amondawa variety)	2020
Anacé		2,018	Ceará		2014
Anambé		182	Pará	Anambé*	2020
Anapuru Muypurá		150	Maranhão		2021
Aparai	Apalai, Apalaí, Apalay, Appirois, Aparathy, Apareilles, Aparai	647	Pará	Aparai	2020
Apiaká	Apiacá	1,050	Mato Grosso, Pará	Apiaká †	2020
Apinayé	Apinajé, Apinaié	2,699	Tocantins	Apinayé	2020
Apurinã	Popukare, Ipurinãn, Kangite, Popengare	10,228	Amazonas, Mato Grosso, Rondônia	Apurinã	2020
Aranã		362	Minas Gerais	Krenak (Aranãa variety)	2010
Arapaso	Arapaço, Araspaso, Koneá	448	Amazonas	Tucano (Arapaso dialect)*	2014
Arapiuns	Arapium	2,204	Pará		2012
Arara	Arara do Pará, Ajujure, Ukaragma	377	Pará	Pará Arára	2014
Arara da Volta Grande do Xingu	Arara do Maia	293	Pará	possibly a Pekodian language †	2019
Arara do Rio Amônia	Arara Apolima, Apolima-Arara	434	Acre		2014
Arara do Rio Branco	Arara do Beiradão, Arara do Aripuanã, Mato Grosso Arára	249	Mato Grosso	Arara do Rio Branco	2014
Arara Shawãdawa	Arara do Acre, Shawanaua	677	Acre	Yaminawa (Shawãdawa dialect)	2014
Araweté	Araueté, Bïde	568	Pará	Araweté	2020
Arikapu	Arikapú, Aricapú	37	Rondônia	Arikapu	2014
Aruá	Aruachi, Aruáshi	121	Rondônia	Aruá	2020
Ashaninka	Ashenika, Kampa	1,720	Acre	Asháninka	2020
Assurini do Tocantins	Akuawa, Asurini	671	Tocantins	Akwáwa (Assurini dialect)	2020
Assurini do Xingu	Assurini, Awaete	219	Pará	Assurini do Xingu	2020
Atikum	Aticum	7,929	Bahia, Pernambuco	Atikum †	2012
Avá-Canoeiro	Canoeiro, Cara-Preta, Carijó, Ãwa	25	Goiás, Tocantins	Avá-Canoeiro	2012
Awa Guajá	Avá, Awá, Awa	520	Maranhão	Guajá	2020
Aweti	Aueti, Awytyza, Enumaniá, Anumaniá, Auetö	221	Mato Grosso	Aweti	2020
Bakairi	Bacairi, Kurä, Kurâ	982	Mato Grosso	Bakairi	2014
Banawá		207	Amazonas	Madí (Banawá dialect)	2014
Baniwa	Baniba, Baniua do Içana, Baniva, Baniua, Curipaco, Dakenei, Issana, Kohoroxitari, Maniba, Walimanai	7,145	Amazonas	Baniwa	2014
Bará	Bara tukano, Waípinõmakã	44	Amazonas	Bará	2017
Barasana	Panenoá	55,	Amazonas	Barasana	2014
Baré	Hanera	11,472	Amazonas	Baré	2014
Borari		1,116	Amazonas, Pará		2014
Bororo	Araripoconé, Araés, Boe, Coxiponé, Cuiabá, Coroados, Porrudos	1,817	Mato Grosso	Bororo	2014
Canela Apanyekrá	Canela, Kanela, Timbira	1,076	Maranhão	Canela-Krahô (Canela dialect)	2012
Canela Ramkokamekrá	Canela, Kanela, Timbira, Memortumré	2,175	Maranhão	Canela-Krahô (Canela dialect)	2012
Chamacoco	Ishiro, Jeywo, Yshyro	40	Mato Grosso do Sul	Chamacoco	2002
Chiquitano	Chiquito	473	Mato Grosso	Chiquitano	2012
Cinta Larga	Matetamãe	1,954	Mato Grosso, Rondônia	Cinta Larga	2014
Dâw	Dow, Kamã, Makú	142	Amazonas	Dâw	2020
Deni	Jamamadi	2,064	Amazonas	Deni	2020
Desana	Desano, Dessano	1,699	Amazonas	Desana	2017
Djeoromitxí	Jabuti, Jabotí, Yabutí	230	Rondônia	Djeoromitxí	2020
Enawenê-nawê	Enawene Nawe, Enáuenês-nauê, Salumã	951	Mato Grosso	Enawenê-nawê	2020
Fulni-ô	Fulniô, Fulni-o	4,689	Pernambuco	Iatê	2014
Galibi do Oiapoque	Kali'na, Kali'na tilewuyu, Galibi	89	Amapá	Karìna	2017
Galibi-Marworno		2,822	Amapá	Karìna	2020
Gamela			Maranhão	Gamela	
Gavião Akrãtikatêjê	Akratikatêjê			Jê	
Gavião Kykatejê		362	Maranhão	Pará Gavião (Kykatejê dialect)	2014
Gavião Parkatêjê	Parkatejê	646	Pará	Pará Gavião (Parkatêjê dialect)	2014
Gavião Pykopjê	Gavião do Maranhão, Gavião Pukobiê, Gavião do Leste, Timbira, Pykopcatejê	769	Maranhão	Pará Gavião (Pykopjê dialect)	2014
Guajajara	Guajájara, Guazazzara, Tenetehar, Tenetehara	28,858	Maranhão	Tenetehara (Guajajara dialect)	2020
Guarani Kaiowá	Kaiowá, Caingua, Caiua, Caiwa, Cayua, Kaiova, Kaiwá, Kayova	31,000	Mato Grosso do Sul	Kaiwá	2012
Guarani Ñandeva	Apytare, Chiripá, Guaraní, Nhandeva, Tsiripá, Txiripá	13,000	MS, PR, RS, SC, SP	Chiripa	2012
Guató		419	Mato Grosso, Mato Grosso do Sul	Guató	2014
Hupda	Hup, Hupdë, Jupde, Ubdé	1,000	Amazonas	Nadahup	2012
Ikolen	Digut, Gavião of Jiparaná, Gavião do Rondônia	691	Rondônia	Mondé	2020
Ikpeng	Txicão, Txikão, Txikân, Chicao, Tunuli, Tonore, Chicão, Tchicão	584	Mato Grosso	Ikpeng	2020
Ingarikó	Acahuayo, Acewaio, Akawai, Akawaio, and Kapon	1,728	Roraima	Kapóng	2020
Iranxe Manoki	Iranxe, Irantxe, Manoki	413	Mato Grosso	Iranxe	2020
Jamamadi	Canamanti, Kanamanti, Madi, Yamamadí	1,138	Amazonas	Madí	2020
Jaraqui		163	Pará		2020
Jarawara	Jarauara	271	Amazonas	Madí (Jarawara dialect)	2014
Javaé	Karajá, Itya Mahãdu	1,510	Goiás, Tocantins	Karajá (Javae dialect)	2020
Jenipapo-Kanindé	Payaku	328	Ceará	Portuguese	2014
Jiahui	Jahoi, Diarroi, Djarroi, Parintintin, Diahoi, Diahui, Kagwaniwa	115	Amazonas	Kawahiva (Diahoi dialect)	2014
Jiripancó	Geripancó, Geripankó, Jeripancó, Jeripankó	1,757	Alagoas		2014
Juma	Arara, Kagwahibm, Kagwahiph, Kagwahiv, Kavahiva, Kawahip, Kawaib, Yumá	12	Amazonas	Kawahiva (Juma dialect)	2020
Ka’apor	Kaapor, Caapor, Kaaporté, Urubú-Kaapor	1,914	Maranhão	Kaʼapor	2020
Kadiwéu	Caduveo, Ediu-Adig, Kadivéu, Kadiveo, Kaduveo, Mbaya-Guaikuru	1,413	Mato Grosso do Sul	Kadiwéu	2014
Kaiabi	Caiabi, Cajabi, Kaiaby, Kajabi, Kawaiwete, Kayabi	2,734	Mato Grosso	Kayabi	2020
Kaimbé	Caimbé	1,135	Bahia	Kaimbé	2020
Kaingang	Kanhgág, Bugre, Caingang, Coroado, Coroados	51,000	Paraná, Rio Grande do Sul, Santa Catarina, São Paulo	Kaingang	2022
Kaixana	Caixana	1,410	Amazonas	Tupi–Guarani	2020
Kalabaça	Calabaça	227	Ceará		2014
Kalankó	Cacalancó	329	Alagoas	Portuguese	2014
Kalapalo	Calapalo	855	Mato Grosso	Karib	2020
Kamaiurá	Camayurá	710	Mato Grosso	Tupi–Guarani	2020
Kamba	Camba	114	Mato Grosso do Sul		2014
Kambeba	Cambemba, Omaguá, Omágua	875	Amazonas	Tupi–Guarani	2014
Kambiwá	Cambiua	3,105	Pernambuco		2014
Kanamari	Canamari, Tukuna	4,684	Amazonas	Katukinan	2020
Kanindé		1,076	Ceará		2014
Kanoê	Canoê, Kapixaná, Kapixanã	319	Rondônia	Kanoe	2014
Kantaruré	Cantaruré	401	Bahia		2014
Kapinawa	Kapinauá, Capinawá	2,263	Pernambuco	Portuguese	2020
Karajá	Iny, Carajá	4,373	Goiás, Mato Grosso, Pará, Tocantins	Karajá	2020
Karajá do Norte	Xambioá, Ixybiowa, or Iraru Mahãndu	287	Tocantins	Karajá (Xambioa dialect)	2014
Karapanã	Muteamasa, Ukopinõpõna	111	Amazonas	Carapana	2014
Karapotó		945	Alagoas		2020
Karipuna do Amapá		3,030	Amapá	Karipúna French Creole	2020
Karipuna de Rondônia	Ahé	55	Rondônia	Kawahiva (Karipuna dialect)	2014
Kariri	Cariri, Kiriri	159	Ceará, Piauí	Portuguese (Kariri)	2014
Karirí-Xocó	Kariri Xucó, Kipeá, Xocó, Xokó, Xokó-Karirí, Xukuru Kariri	2,334	Alagoas		2020
Karitiana	Caritiana, Yjxa	333	Rondônia	Karitiâna	2014
Karo	Arara de Rondônia, Arara Karo, Arara Tupi, Ntogapíd, Ramaráma, Urukú, Urumí, I´târap	414	Rondônia	Ramarama	2020
Karuazu		1,013	Alagoas		2010
Kassupá		149	Rondônia	Aikaná	2013
Katuenayana	Katuwena	140	Amazonas, Pará	Waiwai	2014
Katukina do Rio Biá	Tükuna	2,004	Amazonas	Katukinan	2020
Katukina Pano	Catuquina, Kamanawa, Kamannaua, Katukina do Juruá, Waninnawa	1,154	Acre	Waninawa	2014
Kaxarari	Caxarari	522	Amazonas, Rondônia	Kasharari	2020
Kaxinawá	Cashinauá, Caxinauá, Huni Kuin	11,729	Acre	Kashinawa	2020
Kaxixó	Caxixó	301	Minas Gerais		2014
Kaxuyana	Caxuiana, Kaxuiâna, Kachuana, Kashujana, Kashuyana, Kaxúyana, Warikiana, Warikyana, Purehno	540	Amazonas, Pará	Sikiana	2020
Kinikinau	Terena	600	Mato Grosso do Sul	Terêna	2016
Kiriri	Kariri, Quiriri	2,806	Bahia	Portuguese (Kariri)	2020
Kisêdjê	Kisidjê, Suyá, Khisetje	536	Mato Grosso	Kĩsêdjê	2020
Kokama	Cocoma	19,052	Amazonas	Cocama	2020
Koripako	Kuripako, Coripaco, Curipaco, Curripaco	1,673	Amazonas	Curripaco	2014
Korubo	Caceteiros	127	Amazonas	Korubo	2020
Kotiria		735	Amazonas	Wanano	2005
Krahô	Craô, Kraô, Mehin	3,571	Tocantins	Jê	2020
Krahô-Kanela		122	Tocantins	Jê	2014
Krenak	Crenaque, Crenac, Krenac, Botocudos, Aimorés, Krén	494	Mato Grosso, Minas Gerais, São Paulo	Krenak	2020
Krenyê		104	Maranhão	Jê	2016
Krikatí	Kricati, Kricatijê, Põcatêjê, Timbira	1,031	Maranhão	Jê	2020
Kubeo	Cubeo, Cobewa, Kubéwa, Pamíwa	565	Amazonas	Tucano	2014
Kuikuro	Ipatse Ótomo, Ahukugi Ótomo, Lahatuá Ótomo	802	Mato Grosso	Karib	2020
Kujubim	Cujubi, Cujubim, Kuyubi, Miqueleno, Towa Panka	140	Rondônia	Chapacuran	2014
Kulina	Culina, Madiha	7,217	Amazonas	Arawakan	2014
Kulina Pano	Culina Pano	6,892	Amazonas	Kulina	2020
Kuruaya	Caravare, Curuaia, Kuruaia	283	Pará	Kuruaya	2020
Kwazá	Coaia, Koaiá, Koaya, Quaiá	54	Rondônia	Kwazá	2014
Macuxi	Makuxi, Macushi, Pemon	37,250	Roraima	Macushi	2020
Makuna	Baigana, Buhagana, Paneroa, Wuhána, Yeba–masã, Yehpá Majsá, Yepá–Mahsá	108	Amazonas	Macuna	2017
Makurap	Makuráp, Macuráp, Macurapi, Makurápi, Massaka	579	Rondônia	Makurap	2014
Manchineri	Machinere, Machineri, Manitenerí, Maxinéri, Yine	1,332	Acre	Machinere	2020
Marubo	Kaniuá, Marova, Marúbo	2,008	Amazonas	Marúbo	2014
Matipu	Matipuhy, Mariape-Nahuqua	189	Mato Grosso	Matipuhy	2020
Matis	Matsë, Mushabo, Deshan Mikitbo	529	Amazonas	Matis	2020
Matsés	Mayoruna	1,700	Amazonas	Matsés	2016
Maxakali	Kumanuxú, Maxacalí, Tikmuún, Tikmu'un	2,407	Minas Gerais	Maxakalí	2020
Mbya	Bugre, Mbiá, Mbua, Mbyá, Mbayá, Guarani Mbya	7,000	ES, PA, PR, RJ, RS, SC, SP, TO	Mbyá Guaraní	2012
Mebêngôkre Kayapó	Kayapo, Caiapó, Kayapó, Kokraimoro, Mebengôkre	9,762	Mato Grosso, Pará	Kayapo	2014
Mehinako	Meinako, Mehinaco, Meinacu, Meinaku	341	Mato Grosso	Mehinaku	2020
Menky Manoki	Munku, Menku, Myky, Manoki	131	Mato Grosso	Iranxe (Myky dialect)	2020
Migueleno		267	Rondônia	Wanyam	2014
Miranha	Bora, Boro, Miraña, Mirãnia	1,685	Amazonas	Boran	2020
Mirity-tapuya	Buia-tapuya	94	Amazonas	Miriti	2017
Mukurin			Minas Gerais		
Munduruku	Mundurucu, Maytapu, Cara Preta, Wuyjuyu	17,997	Amazonas, Pará	Munduruku	2020
Mura		18,511	Amazonas	Mura	2020
Nadöb	Macú Nadob, Maku Nadeb	483	Amazonas	Nadëb	2014
Nahukuá	Nauquá, Nahukwá	169	Mato Grosso	Kuikúro (Kalapalo dialect)	2020
Nambikwara	Anunsu, Nambiquara	2,332	Mato Grosso, Rondônia	Nambikwara	2014
Naruvoto		81	Mato Grosso	Kuikúro	2003
Nawa	Náua	535	Acre	Náwa	2020
Nukini	Nuquini	726	Acre	Nukini	2020
Ofaié	Ofayé, Ofaié-Xavante	69	Mato Grosso do Sul	Ofayé	2014
Oro Win	Oro-uin	88	Rondônia	Oro Win	2014
Palikur	Paricuria, Paricores, Palincur, Parikurene, Parinkur-Iéne, Païkwené	1,935	Amapá	Palikúr	2020
Panará	Kreen-Akarore, Krenhakore, Krenakore	704	Mato Grosso	Panará	2022
Pankaiuká		150	Pernambuco		2011
Pankará		3,080	Pernambuco		2020
Pankararé	Pancararé	1,648	Bahia	Portuguese	2014
Pankararu	Pancaré, Pancaru, Pankarará, Pankararú	8,184	Mato Grosso, Pernambuco, São Paulo	Portuguese (Pankararú)	2014
Pankaru	Pankararu-Salambaia	123	Bahia	Portuguese	2020
Parakanã	Awaeté	2,042	Pará	Parakanã	2020
Paresí	Arití, Halíti	2,138	Mato Grosso	Paresi	2014
Parintintin	Cabahyba	480	Amazonas	Kawahiva (Parintintin dialect)	2014
Patamona	Ingarikó, Kapon	338	Roraima	Kapóng	2020
Pataxó	Patachó, Patashó, Pataso	12,865	Bahia, Mato Grosso	Pataxó	2020
Paumari	Pamoari	1,804	Amazonas	Paumarí	2014
Pipipã		1,391	Pernambuco		2013
Pira-tapuya	Piratapuya, Piratapuyo, Piratuapuia, Pira-Tapuya, Waíkhana	756	Amazonas	Piratapuyo	2020
Pirahã	Mura Pirahã, Hiaitsiihi	592	Amazonas	Mura (Pirahã)	2014
Pitaguary	Potiguara, Pitaguari	3,623	Ceará	Portuguese	2014
Potiguara	Potyguara, Pitiguara	18,445	Ceará, Paraíba, Pernambuco, Rio Grande do Norte	Portuguese	2014
Puruborá		243	Rondônia	Puruborá	2014
Puyanawa	Poianáua, Puinahua	745	Acre	Poyanawa	2014
Rikbaktsa	Aripaktsa, Canoeiro, Erikbatsa, Erikpatsa	1,600	Mato Grosso	Rikbaktsa	2020
Sakurabiat	Mequéns, Sakiriabar, Sakurabiat	219	Rondônia	Mekéns	2014
Sateré Mawé	Sateré-Maué, Mawé	16,312	Amazonas	Mawé	2020
Shanenawa	Katukina Shanenawa	769	Acre	Shanenawa	2020
Siriano	Sarirá, Siriana, Siriane, Surianá, Surirá, Suryana	86	Amazonas	Siriano	2014
Surui Paiter	Suruí, Paiter	1,375	Mato Grosso, Rondônia	Surui	2014
Suruwahá	Zuruahã	171	Amazonas	Zuruahá	2014
Tabajara		3,279	Ceará, Piauí		2020
Tapajó		241	Pará		2020
Tapayuna	Tapayúna, Beiço de pau, Kajkwakratxi	432	Mato Grosso, Pará	Tapayuna	2024
Tapeba	Perna-de-pau, Tapebano	7,038	Ceará		2020
Tapirapé	Apyãwa	917	Mato Grosso, Tocantins	Tapirapé	2020
Tapuio	Tapuya, Tapuia	369	Ceará, Goiás, Piauí, Rio Grande do Norte		2020
Tariana	Taliáseri, Tariano, Tariáno, Tarîna	2,684	Amazonas	Tariana	2014
Taurepang	Taulipang, Taurepangue, Taulipangue, Pemon	849	Roraima	Pemon	2020
Tembé	Tenetehara	2,096	Maranhão, Pará	Tenetehara (Tembe)	2020
Tenharim	Kagwahiva	828	Amazonas	Kawahiva (Tenharim dialect)	2014
Terena	Etelena, Terêna	26,065	Mato Grosso, Mato Grosso do Sul, São Paulo	Terêna	2014
Ticuna	Magüta, Tikuna, Tukuna	57,571	Amazonas	Ticuna	2020
Tingui Botó	Tingui-botó, Carapató, Dzboku’a, Dzubukuá, Karapató, Tingui	407	Alagoas	Portuguese	2020
Tiriyó	Tirió, Tarona, Yawi, Pianokoto, Wü tarëno, Txukuyana, Ewarhuyana, Akuriyó	2,076	Pará	Tiriyó	2020
Torá		330	Amazonas	Portuguese (Torá)	2014
Tremembé		3,837	Ceará	Portuguese (Tremembé)	2020
Truká		3,233	Bahia, Pernambuco	Portuguese (Truká)	2020
Trumai	Trumái	260	Mato Grosso	Trumai	2020
Tsohom-dyapa	Tyohom-dyapa	38	Amazonas	Tsohom Djapá	2016
Tukano	Daxsea, Tukána, Tucano, Ye´pâ-masa	5,731	Amazonas	Tucano	2014
Tumbalalá		1,381	Bahia	Portuguese	2020
Tunayana		107	Amazonas, Pará	Waiwai	2010
Tupari		607	Rondônia	Tupari	2014
Tupinambá		7,656	Bahia, Pará	Portuguese (Tupi)	2020
Tupiniquim	Tupinikim, Tupinaki, Tupinikim, Tupinikin	3,278	Espírito Santo	Portuguese	2020
Turiwára	Turiuara	30	Pará	Turiwára	1995
Tuxá	Todela, Tusha	1,703	Alagoas, Bahia, Minas Gerais, Pernambuco	Portuguese (Tuxá)	2014
Tuyuka	Dochkafuara, Doka-Poara, Doxká-Poárá, Tuiuca, Tuyuca, Utapinopona	1,050	Amazonas	Tuyuca	2014
Umutina	Omotina, Balatiponé	515	Mato Grosso	Umotína	2014
Uru-Eu-Wau-Wau	Jupaú	127	Rondônia	Kawahiva (Uru-Eu-Wau-Wau dialect)	2020
Waimiri-Atroarí	Atroahy, Atroaí, Atroarí, Atrowari, Atruahí, Ki’nya, Waimiri Atroari, Kinja	2,394	Amazonas	Waimiri-Atroarí	2022
Waiwai	Wai-wai, Ouayeone, Uaieue, Uaiuai	2,691	Amazonas, Pará	Waiwai	2020
Wajãpi	Wayapi, Wajapi, Oiampi	1,612	Amapá, Pará	Wayampi	2020
Wajuru	Wayoró, Ayurú, Uaiora, Wajaru, Wayurú, Ajurú	248	Roraima	Wayoró	2014
Wapishana	Wapichana, Wapixana, Uapixana	11,309	Roraima	Wapishana	2020
Warekena	Uarekena	1,039	Amazonas	Warekena	2014
Wariʼ	Pakaa Nova, Waricaca', Uari, Orowari,	4,461	Rondônia	Wariʼ	2020
Wassu	Uassu, Wasu	2,014	Alagoas	Portuguese (Wasu)	2014
Wauja	Uauja, Waurá, Waujá	672	Mato Grosso	Waurá	2020
Wayana	Uaiana, Upurui, Roucouyen, Orkokoyana, Urucuiana, Urukuyana, Alucuyana	374	Pará	Wayana	2020
Witoto	Uitoto	84	Amazonas	Witoto	2014
Xakriabá	Xacriaba	8,867	Minas Gerais	Xakriabá	2014
Xavante	A´uwe	22,256	Mato Grosso	Xavante	2020
Xerente	Xerentes, Akwê	3,964	Tocantins	Xerénte	2022
Xetá		69	Paraná	Xeta	2020
Xikrin	Caiapós-xicrin, Kayapó Xikrin, Mebengôkre	2,267	Pará	Kayapo (Xikrin dialect)	2020
Xipaya	Xipaia	241	Pará	Yuruna, Xipaya	2020
Xokleng	Xoclengue, Aweikoma	2,153	Santa Catarina	Xokleng	2020
Xokó	Xocó	340	Sergipe	Portuguese (Xocó)	2014
Xukuru		8,481	Pernambuco	Portuguese (Xukuru)	2020
Yaminawá	Yaminawa	1,454	Acre, Bolivia	Yaminawa	2014
Yanomami	Ianomâmi	30,390	Amazonas, Roraima	Yanomami	2023
Yawalapiti	Iaualapiti	309	Mato Grosso	Yawalapití	2020
Yawanawá	Iauanauá	849	Acre	Yawanawa	2020
Ye'kwana	Ye'kuana, Yekuana, Yequana, Maiongong, Soto	681	Roraima	Yeꞌkuana	2020
Yuhupdeh	Yuhupdeh, Yuhupdëh	1,058	Amazonas	Hup	2020
Yudja	Jurúna, Iuruna, Jaruna, Yudjá, Yudya, Yurúna	950	Mato Grosso	Yuruna	2020
Zo'é	Poturu	331	Pará	Zoʼé	2022
Zoró	Pangyjej	787	Mato Grosso, Rondônia	Zoro	2020

== Post-Cabralian groups ==
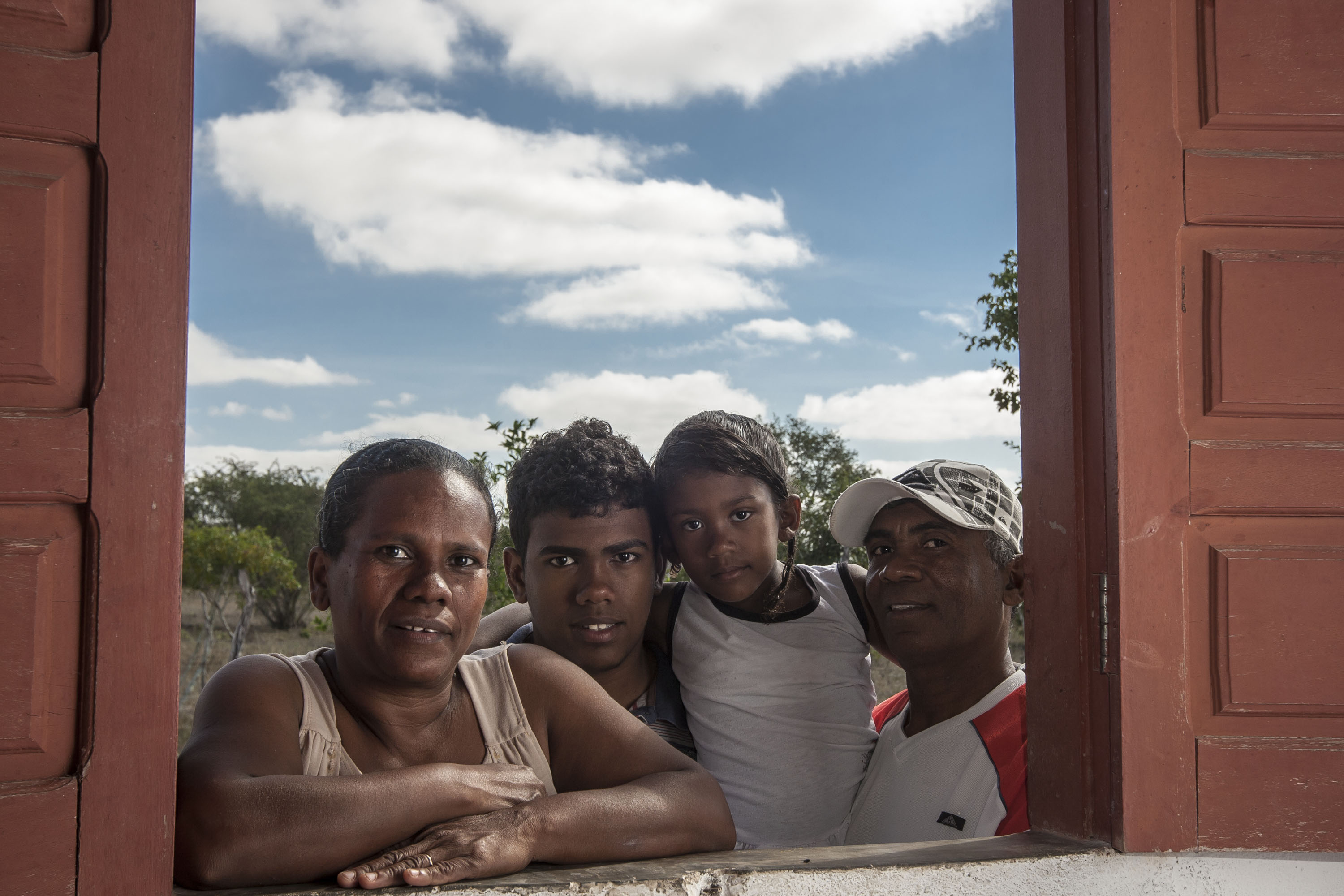
Family of Sertanejos in Teofilândia, Bahia. 2013.

The "post-Cabralian" peoples refers to the ethnocultural groups that originated in Brazilian territory after the beginning of Portuguese colonization, stemming from the mixing between different European, Amerindian and African ethnicities and their adaptation to life in the new world. These cultures eventually differentiated and from each other through the centuries, as is natural in a nation of continental proportions as Brazil.

Some of these peoples still preserve customs and linguistic traits that were present in their source populations when they immigrated to the new world but are no longer present in their old world versions, a phenomenon known as colonial lag. Examples of cultural and linguistic preservation of medieval Portuguese traditions and language in Brazil include the presence of scheduled weekly outdoors markets, religious festivities, and the similarity between northeastern Brazilian dialects and Old Portuguese language.

Group	Approximate population (2022)	Percentage of population (2022)	Distribution	Language/dialect	Origin
Caipiras	45,000,000	22.1%	Mato Grosso do Sul, Goiás, parts of São Paulo, Minas Gerais, Paraná, Mato Grosso, Rondônia, Tocantins, arc of deforestation	Caipira, Sertanejo and Serra Amazônica dialects	Mix of Portuguese, Africans and Tupi/Jê Indigenous peoples, with later assimilation of Italian immigrants
Sertanejos	28,000,000	13.7%	Sertão and Agreste sub-regions of Bahia, Sergipe, Alagoas, Pernambuco, Paraíba, Rio Grande do Norte, Ceará and Piauí	Central Northeastern, Baiano and Costa Norte dialects	Mix of Portuguese, Africans and Jê-speaking indigenous peoples
Matutos	13,000,000	6.3%	Coastal sub-region of Sergipe, Alagoas, Pernambuco, Paraíba and Rio Grande do Norte	Central Northeastern and Recifense dialects	Mix of Portuguese, Africans and Tupi-speaking indigenous peoples
Baianos	9,300,000	4.5%	Coastal and southern Bahia, northern Espírito Santo	Baiano dialect	Mix of Portuguese and African peoples
Geraizeiros	2,100,000	1%	Northern Minas Gerais	Baiano and Mineiro dialects	Mix of Sertanejos and Mineiros
Paulistanos	22,000,000	10.7%	Metropolitan São Paulo and major costal cities of the São Paulo state	Paulistano dialect	Mix of Caipiras and the multiple waves of immigrants that moved to São Paulo since the 19th century
Mineiros	11,500,000	5.6%	Central Minas Gerais	Mineiro dialect	Mix of Portuguese, Africans and Jê-speaking indigenous peoples
Cariocas	13,200,000	6.5%	Metropolitan Rio de Janeiro	Carioca dialect	Mix of Portuguese, Africans and Tupi-speaking indigenous peoples
Fluminenses	5,800,000	2.8%	Rio de Janeiro state (outside of the metropolitan city of Rio), parts of Espírito Santo and Minas Gerais	Fluminense dialect	Mix of Portuguese, Africans and Tupi-speaking indigenous peoples
Caiçaras	800,000	0.4%	Parts of the coast of Rio de Janeiro and Paraná, coastal São Paulo, outside of major cities	Caiçara dialect	Mix of Portuguese, Africans and Tupi-speaking indigenous peoples
Maranhenses	8,000,000	4%	Maranhão, parts of Piauí	Costa Norte and Central Northeastern dialects	Mix of Portuguese, Africans and Tupi/Jê Indigenous peoples
Gaúchos	6,500,000	3.2%	Southern half of Rio Grande do Sul, arc of deforestation	Gaúcho dialect	Mix of Portuguese and Guarani indigenous peoples
Caboclos	10,200,000	5%	Northern Brazil, except for indigenous villages and the lower 2/3 of the arc of deforestation and northeastern Pará	Nortista dialect	Mix of Portuguese, Africans and Amazonian indigenous peoples. With later assimilation of Sertanejo immigrants
Capixabas	2,500,000	1.2%	Parts of Espírito Santo	Fluminense dialect	Mix of Portuguese, Africans and Tupi/Jê Indigenous peoples
Bragantinos	4,300,000	2.1%	Northeastern Pará, parts of Maranhão	Nortista dialect	Mix of Portuguese, Africans and Tupi indigenous peoples
Catarinenses	4,100,000	2%	Coastal Santa Catarina	Sulista and Manézinho dialects	Mix of Azorean Portuguese and Tupi indigenous peoples
Colonos	13,400,000	6.6%	Southern half of Paraná, inner Santa Catarina, northern half of Rio Grande do Sul	Sulista and Gaúcho dialects, non-Portuguese European languages among older generations	Mix of Portuguese, Italian, German, Polish, Ukrainian and Jê/Tupi indigenous peoples
Hunrisqueanos	1,500,000	0.7%	Parts of inner Santa Catarina, Rio Grande do Sul and Espírito Santo	Hunsrik language	Partially unassimilated German immigrants
Talianos	350,000	0.2%	Parts of inner Southern Brazil and Espírito Santo	Talian dialect of Venetian	Partially unassimilated Venetian immigrants
Ciganos	800,000	0.4%	Northeastern Brazil and Minas Gerais	Baiano, Mineiro and Central Northeastern dialects, Caló language	Mix of Iberian Romanis, Portuguese, African and Jê/Tupi indigenous people

== Diasporic groups ==
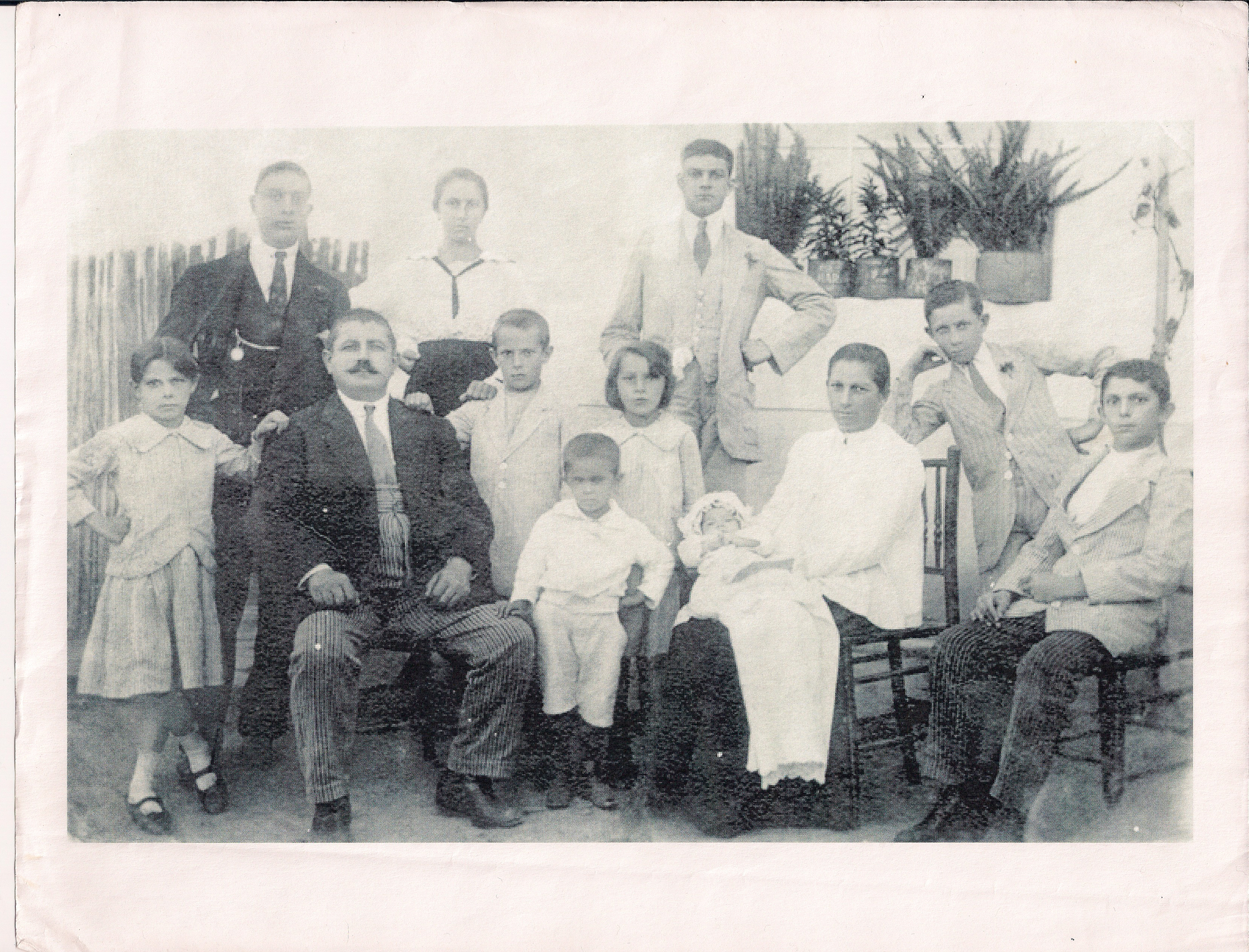
Family of Venetian immigrants in Brazil, early 20th century.

The diasporic groups are the immigrants and descendants of immigrants from around the world that moved to Brazil, the vast majority of these people were assimilated to the local cultures of the parts of the country they moved to and mixed with locals or with immigrants from other nations.

Group	Population	Distribution
Germans	12,000,000	Southern Brazil and Espírito Santo
Italians	32,000,000	Southern and Southeastern Brazil
Portuguese	Incalculable, likely over 150 million	Entire national territory
Polish	2,000,000	Paraná.
Ukrainians	600,000	Paraná
French	1,000,000	Southeastern and Northeastern Brazil
Venezuelans	600,000	Northern Brazil and São Paulo
Russians	200,000	Southern Brazil
Lebanese	10,000,000	São Paulo, Paraná and Mato Grosso do Sul
Syrians	3,000,000	São Paulo and Paraná
Palestinians	65,000	São Paulo
Haitians	180,000	São Paulo
Moroccan Jews	24,000	Amazonas
Spanish	15,000,000	Entire national territory
Africans	Incalculable, likely over 120 million	Entire national territory
Japanese	2,000,000	São Paulo, Paraná and Pará
Chinese	350,000	São Paulo
Bolivians	350,000	São Paulo, Mato Grosso
Americans	260,000	São Paulo
Colombians	110,000	São Paulo
Argentinians	78,000	São Paulo, Southern Brazil
Uruguayans	50,000	São Paulo, Southern Brazil
Peruvians	70,000	São Paulo
Paraguayans	60,000	Paraná and São Paulo
Dutch	11,000	São Paulo and Pernambuco
Irish	40,000	São Paulo
Swiss	500,000	Rio de Janeiro
Austrians	100,000	Rio de Janeiro
Hungarians	100,000	Santa Catarina
Finns	90,000	Rio de Janeiro
Belgian	6,000	São Paulo
Greek	50,000	São Paulo
Turkish	6,000	São Paulo
Romanians	40,000	São Paulo
Lithuanians	300,000	São Paulo
English	24,000	São Paulo
Scottish	80,000	São Paulo
Bulgarians	65,000	São Paulo
Croatians	45,000	São Paulo
Danish	52,000	São Paulo
Norwegians	10,000	São Paulo
Luxembourgers	50,000	São Paulo
Armenians	100,000	São Paulo
Canadians	11,000	São Paulo
Chileans	26,000	São Paulo
Koreans	50,000	São Paulo and Ceará
