= List of Indigenous peoples of Brazil =

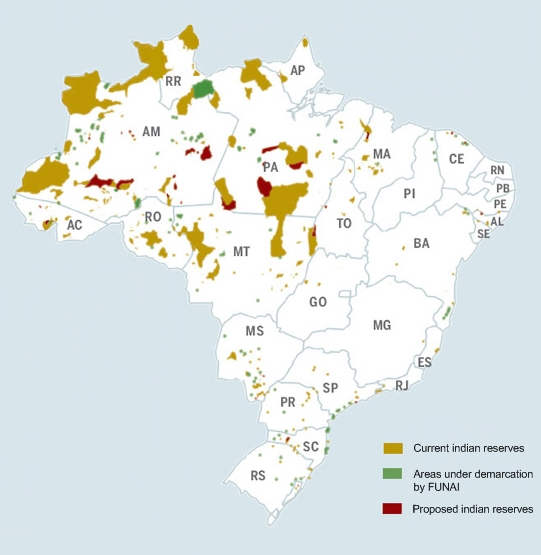
Indigenous Territories in Brazil

This is a list of Brazil's Indigenous or Native peoples, associated languages, Indigenous locations, and population estimates with dates. A particular group listing may include more than one area because the group is distributed in more than one area.

== Background ==
The Indigenous peoples in Brazil (Portuguese: povos indígenas no Brasil) comprise a large number of distinct ethnic groups, who have inhabited the country prior to the European. The word índios ("Indians"), was by then established to designate the people of the Americas and is still used today in the Portuguese language to designate these peoples, while the people of Asiatic India are called indianos.

At the time of first European contact, some of the Indigenous peoples were traditionally semi-nomadic tribes who subsisted on hunting, fishing, gathering, agriculture, and arboriculture. Many of the estimated 2,000 nations and tribes which existed in the 16th century died out as a consequence of the European settlement. Most of the Indigenous population died due to European diseases and warfare, declining from an estimated pre-Columbian high of millions to some 300,000 in 1997, grouped into some 200 tribes. A few tribes were assimilated into the Brazilian population.

In 2007, FUNAI reported that it had confirmed the presence of 67 different uncontacted tribes in Brazil, an increase from 40 in 2005. With this addition Brazil has now surpassed New Guinea as the country having the largest number of uncontacted peoples.

Seven Terras Indígenas (TI) (Reservations) are exclusively reserved for isolated people:

- TI Alto Tarauacá in Acre – Various tribes. (Isolados do Alto Tarauacá)
- TI Hi-Merimã in Amazonas – Himerimã. (Isolados do médio Purus)
- TI Massaco in Rondônia – Sirionó (Isolados do rio São Simão)
- TI Igarapé Omerê in Rondônia – Kanoe do Omerê & Akuntsu
- TI Rio Muqui in Rondônia – Isolados das cabeceiras do rio Muqui (Given as Miqueleno-Kujubim in the table).
- TI Rio Pardo in Mato Grosso and Amazonas – Isolados do Rio Pardo (Tupi–Guarani–Kawahibi).
- TI Xinane isolados in Acre – Unidentified.

== Table of Indigenous peoples of Brazil ==
In this table, (†) means a language is presumed extinct, and (*) means it is possibly extinct, but lacks conclusive supporting evidence.

Name	Other names	Language	Location	Population census/estimated	Year
Aikanã	Massacá, Tubarão, Columbiara, Mundé, Mondé, Huari, Aikaná	Aikanã	Rondônia	350	2014
Aikewara	Akewara, Akewere, Suruí, Sororos	Suruí do Pará	Pará	470	2020
Akuntsu	Akunt'su	Akuntsu	Rondônia	3	2022
Amanayé	Amanaié, Amanyé, Araradeua	Amanayé*	Pará	174	2017
Amondawa	Amondaua, Amundava, Amundawa, Uru-Eu-Wau-Wau, Mbo'uima'ga, Envuga	Southern Kagwahiva (Amondawa variety)	Acre, Rondônia	129	2020
Anacé			Ceará	2,018	2014
Anambé		Anambé*	Pará	182	2020
Anapuru Muypurá			Maranhão	150	2021
Aparai	Apalai, Apalaí, Apalay, Appirois, Aparathy, Apareilles, Aparai	Aparai	French Guiana, Pará, Suriname	697 (Brazil: 647, French Guiana: 40, Suriname: 10)	2020
Apiaká	Apiacá	Apiaká †	Mato Grosso, Pará	1,050	2020
Apinayé	Apinajé, Apinaié	Apinayé	Tocantins	2,699	2020
Apurinã	Popukare, Ipurinãn, Kangite, Popengare	Apurinã	Amazonas, Mato Grosso, Rondônia	10,228	2020
Aranã		Krenak (Aranãa variety)	Minas Gerais	362	2010
Arapaso	Arapaço, Araspaso, Koneá	Tucano (Arapaso dialect)*	Amazonas	448	2014
Arapiuns	Arapium		Pará	2,204	2012
Arara	Arara do Pará, Ajujure, Ukaragma	Pará Arára	Pará	377	2014
Arara da Volta Grande do Xingu	Arara do Maia	possibly a Pekodian language †	Pará	293	2019
Arara do Rio Amônia	Arara Apolima, Apolima-Arara		Acre	434	2014
Arara do Rio Branco	Arara do Beiradão, Arara do Aripuanã, Mato Grosso Arára	Arara do Rio Branco	Mato Grosso	249	2014
Arara Shawãdawa	Arara do Acre, Shawanaua	Yaminawa (Shawãdawa dialect)	Acre	677	2014
Araweté	Araueté, Bïde	Araweté	Pará	568	2020
Arikapu	Arikapú, Aricapú	Arikapu	Rondônia	37	2014
Aruá	Aruachi, Aruáshi	Aruá	Rondônia	121	2020
Ashaninka	Ashenika, Kampa	Asháninka	Acre, Peru	99,197 (Brazil: 1,720, Peru: 97,477)	2020
Assurini do Tocantins	Akuawa, Asurini	Akwáwa (Assurini dialect)	Tocantins	671	2020
Assurini do Xingu	Assurini, Awaete	Assurini do Xingu	Pará	219	2020
Atikum	Aticum	Atikum †	Bahia, Pernambuco	7,929	2012
Avá-Canoeiro	Canoeiro, Cara-Preta, Carijó, Ãwa	Avá-Canoeiro	Goiás, Tocantins	25	2012
Awa Guajá	Avá, Awá, Awa	Guajá	Maranhão	520	2020
Aweti	Aueti, Awytyza, Enumaniá, Anumaniá, Auetö	Aweti	Mato Grosso	221	2020
Bakairi	Bacairi, Kurä, Kurâ	Bakairi	Mato Grosso	982	2014
Banawá		Madí (Banawá dialect)	Amazonas	207	2014
Baniwa	Baniba, Baniua do Içana, Baniva, Baniua, Curipaco, Dakenei, Issana, Kohoroxitari, Maniba, Walimanai	Baniwa	Amazonas, Colombia, Venezuela	17,646 (Brazil: 7,145, Colombia: 7,000, Venezuela: 3,501)	2014
Bará	Bara tukano, Waípinõmakã	Bará	Amazonas, Colombia	340 (Brazil: 44, Colombia: 296)	2017
Barasana	Panenoá	Barasana	Amazonas, Colombia	994 (Brazil: 55, Colombia: 939)	2014
Baré	Hanera	Baré	Amazonas, Venezuela	16,516 (Brazil: 11,472, Venezuela: 5,044)	2014
Borari			Amazonas, Pará	1,116	2014
Bororo	Araripoconé, Araés, Boe, Coxiponé, Cuiabá, Coroados, Porrudos	Bororo	Mato Grosso	1,817	2014
Canela Apanyekrá	Canela, Kanela, Timbira	Canela-Krahô (Canela dialect)	Maranhão	1,076	2012
Canela Ramkokamekrá	Canela, Kanela, Timbira, Memortumré	Canela-Krahô (Canela dialect)	Maranhão	2,175	2012
Chamacoco	Ishiro, Jeywo, Yshyro	Chamacoco	Mato Grosso do Sul, Paraguay	1,611 (Brazil: 40, Paraguay: 1,571)	2002
Chiquitano	Chiquito	Chiquitano	Bolivia, Mato Grosso	88,358 (Bolivia: 87,885, Brazil: 473)	2012
Cinta Larga	Matetamãe	Cinta Larga	Mato Grosso, Rondônia	1,954	2014
Dâw	Dow, Kamã, Makú	Dâw	Amazonas	142	2020
Deni	Jamamadi	Deni	Amazonas	2,064	2020
Desana	Desano, Dessano	Desana	Amazonas, Colombia	3,735 (Brazil: 1,699, Colombia: 2,036)	2017
Djeoromitxí	Jabuti, Jabotí, Yabutí	Djeoromitxí	Rondônia	230	2020
Enawenê-nawê	Enawene Nawe, Enáuenês-nauê, Salumã	Enawenê-nawê	Mato Grosso	951	2020
Fulni-ô	Fulniô, Fulni-o	Iatê	Pernambuco	4,689	2014
Galibi do Oiapoque	Kali'na, Kali'na tilewuyu, Galibi	Karìna	Amapá, French Guiana, Suriname, Venezuela	39,913 (Brazil: 89, French Guiana: 3,000, Suriname: 3,000, Venezuela: 33,824)	2017
Galibi-Marworno		Karìna	Amapá	2,822	2020
Gamela		Gamela	Maranhão		
Gavião Akrãtikatêjê	Akratikatêjê	Jê			
Gavião Kykatejê		Pará Gavião (Kykatejê dialect)	Maranhão	362	2014
Gavião Parkatêjê	Parkatejê	Pará Gavião (Parkatêjê dialect)	Pará	646	2014
Gavião Pykopjê	Gavião do Maranhão, Gavião Pukobiê, Gavião do Leste, Timbira, Pykopcatejê	Pará Gavião (Pykopjê dialect)	Maranhão	769	2014
Guajajara	Guajájara, Guazazzara, Tenetehar, Tenetehara	Tenetehara (Guajajara dialect)	Maranhão	28,858	2020
Guarani Kaiowá	Kaiowá, Caingua, Caiua, Caiwa, Cayua, Kaiova, Kaiwá, Kayova	Kaiwá	Mato Grosso do Sul, Paraguay	46,097 (Brazil: 31,000, Paraguay: 15,097)	2012
Guarani Ñandeva	Apytare, Chiripá, Guaraní, Nhandeva, Tsiripá, Txiripá	Chiripa	Argentina, Paraguay, MS, PR, RS, SC, SP	16,393 (Argentina: 1,000, Brazil: 13,000, Paraguay: 2,393)	2012
Guató		Guató	Mato Grosso, Mato Grosso do Sul	419	2014
Hupda	Hup, Hupdë, Jupde, Ubdé	Nadahup	Amazonas, Colombia	1,500 (Brazil: 1,000, Colombia: 500)	2012
Ikolen	Digut, Gavião of Jiparaná, Gavião do Rondônia	Mondé	Rondônia	691	2020
Ikpeng	Txicão, Txikão, Txikân, Chicao, Tunuli, Tonore, Chicão, Tchicão	Ikpeng	Mato Grosso	584	2020
Ingarikó	Acahuayo, Acewaio, Akawai, Akawaio, and Kapon	Kapóng	Roraima, Guyana, Venezuela	6,456 (Brazil: 1,728, Guyana: 4,000, Venezuela: 728)	2020
Iranxe Manoki	Iranxe, Irantxe, Manoki	Iranxe	Mato Grosso	413	2020
Jamamadi	Canamanti, Kanamanti, Madi, Yamamadí	Madí	Amazonas	1,138	2020
Jaraqui			Pará	163	2020
Jarawara	Jarauara	Madí (Jarawara dialect)	Amazonas	271	2014
Javaé	Karajá, Itya Mahãdu	Karajá (Javae dialect)	Goiás, Tocantins	1,510	2020
Jenipapo-Kanindé	Payaku	Portuguese	Ceará	328	2014
Jiahui	Jahoi, Diarroi, Djarroi, Parintintin, Diahoi, Diahui, Kagwaniwa	Kawahiva (Diahoi dialect)	Amazonas	115	2014
Jiripancó	Geripancó, Geripankó, Jeripancó, Jeripankó		Alagoas	1,757	2014
Juma	Arara, Kagwahibm, Kagwahiph, Kagwahiv, Kavahiva, Kawahip, Kawaib, Yumá	Kawahiva (Juma dialect)	Amazonas	12	2020
Ka’apor	Kaapor, Caapor, Kaaporté, Urubú-Kaapor	Kaʼapor	Maranhão	1,914	2020
Kadiwéu	Caduveo, Ediu-Adig, Kadivéu, Kadiveo, Kaduveo, Mbaya-Guaikuru	Kadiwéu	Mato Grosso do Sul	1,413	2014
Kaiabi	Caiabi, Cajabi, Kaiaby, Kajabi, Kawaiwete, Kayabi	Kayabi	Mato Grosso	2,734	2020
Kaimbé	Caimbé	Kaimbé	Bahía	1,135	2020
Kaingang	Kanhgág, Bugre, Caingang, Coroado, Coroados	Kaingang	Paraná, Rio Grande do Sul, Santa Catarina, São Paulo	51,000	2022
Kaixana	Caixana	Tupi–Guarani	Amazonas	1,410	2020
Kalabaça	Calabaça		Ceará	227	2014
Kalankó	Cacalancó	Portuguese	Alagoas	329	2014
Kalapalo	Calapalo	Karib	Mato Grosso	855	2020
Kamaiurá	Camayurá	Tupi–Guarani	Mato Grosso	710	2020
Kamba	Camba		Mato Grosso do Sul	114	2014
Kambeba	Cambemba, Omaguá, Omágua	Tupi–Guarani	Amazonas, Peru	4,375 (Brazil: 875, Peru: 3,500)	2014
Kambiwá	Cambiua		Pernambuco	3,105	2014
Kanamari	Canamari, Tukuna	Katukinan	Amazonas	4,684	2020
Kanindé			Ceará	1,076	2014
Kanoê	Canoê, Kapixaná, Kapixanã	Kanoe	Rondônia	319	2014
Kantaruré	Cantaruré		Bahia	401	2014
Kapinawa	Kapinauá, Capinawá	Portuguese	Pernambuco	2,263	2020
Karajá	Iny, Carajá	Karajá	Goiás, Mato Grosso, Pará, Tocantins	4,373	2020
Karajá do Norte	Xambioá, Ixybiowa, or Iraru Mahãndu	Karajá (Xambioa dialect)	Tocantins	287	2014
Karapanã	Muteamasa, Ukopinõpõna	Carapana	Amazonas, Colombia	523 (Brazil: 111, Colombia: 412)	2014
Karapotó			Alagoas	945	2020
Karipuna do Amapá		Karipúna French Creole	Amapá	3,030	2020
Karipuna de Rondônia	Ahé	Kawahiva (Karipuna dialect)	Rondônia	55	2014
Kariri	Cariri, Kiriri	Portuguese (Kariri)	Ceará, Piauí	159	2014
Karirí-Xocó	Kariri Xucó, Kipeá, Xocó, Xokó, Xokó-Karirí, Xukuru Kariri		Alagoas	2,334	2020
Karitiana	Caritiana, Yjxa	Karitiâna	Rondônia	333	2014
Karo	Arara de Rondônia, Arara Karo, Arara Tupi, Ntogapíd, Ramaráma, Urukú, Urumí, I´târap	Ramarama	Rondônia	414	2020
Karuazu			Alagoas	1,013	2010
Kassupá		Aikaná	Rondônia	149	2013
Katuenayana	Katuwena	Waiwai	Amazonas, Pará	140	2014
Katukina do Rio Biá	Tükuna	Katukinan	Amazonas	2,004	2020
Katukina Pano	Catuquina, Kamanawa, Kamannaua, Katukina do Juruá, Waninnawa	Waninawa	Acre	1,154	2014
Kaxarari	Caxarari	Kasharari	Amazonas, Rondônia	522	2020
Kaxinawá	Cashinauá, Caxinauá, Huni Kuin	Kashinawa	Acre, Peru	14,148 (Brazil: 11,729, Peru: 2,419)	2020
Kaxixó	Caxixó		Minas Gerais	301	2014
Kaxuyana	Caxuiana, Kaxuiâna, Kachuana, Kashujana, Kashuyana, Kaxúyana, Warikiana, Warikyana, Purehno	Sikiana	Amazonas, Pará	540	2020
Kinikinau	Terena	Terêna	Mato Grosso do Sul	600	2016
Kiriri	Kariri, Quiriri	Portuguese (Kariri)	Bahia	2,806	2020
Kisêdjê	Kisidjê, Suyá, Khisetje	Kĩsêdjê	Mato Grosso	536	2020
Kokama	Cocoma	Cocama	Amazonas, Colombia, Peru	30,658 (Brazil: 19,052, Colombia: 236, Peru: 11,370)	2020
Koripako	Kuripako, Coripaco, Curipaco, Curripaco	Curripaco	Amazonas, Colombia, Venezuela	14,425 (Brazil: 1,673, Colombia: 7,827, Venezuela: 4,925)	2014
Korubo	Caceteiros	Korubo	Amazonas	127	2020
Kotiria		Wanano	Amazonas, Colombia	1,848 (Brazil: 735, Colombia: 1,113)	2005
Krahô	Craô, Kraô, Mehin	Jê	Tocantins	3,571	2020
Krahô-Kanela		Jê	Tocantins	122	2014
Krenak	Crenaque, Crenac, Krenac, Botocudos, Aimorés, Krén	Krenak	Mato Grosso, Minas Gerais, São Paulo	494	2020
Krenyê		Jê	Maranhão	104	2016
Krikatí	Kricati, Kricatijê, Põcatêjê, Timbira	Jê	Maranhão	1,031	2020
Kubeo	Cubeo, Cobewa, Kubéwa, Pamíwa	Tucano	Amazonas, Colombia, Venezuela	4,859 (Brazil: 565, Colombia: 4,238, Venezuela: 56)	2014
Kuikuro	Ipatse Ótomo, Ahukugi Ótomo, Lahatuá Ótomo	Karib	Mato Grosso	802	2020
Kujubim	Cujubi, Cujubim, Kuyubi, Miqueleno, Towa Panka	Chapacuran	Rondônia	140	2014
Kulina	Culina, Madiha	Arawakan	Amazonas, Peru	7,628 (Brazil: 7,211, Peru: 417)	2014
Kulina Pano	Culina Pano	Kulina	Amazonas	6,892	2020
Kuruaya	Caravare, Curuaia, Kuruaia	Kuruaya	Pará	283	2020
Kwazá	Coaia, Koaiá, Koaya, Quaiá	Kwazá	Rondônia	54	2014
Macuxi	Makuxi, Macushi, Pemon	Macushi	Roraima, Guyana, Venezuela	46,839 (Brazil: 37,250, Guyana: 9,500, Venezuela: 89)	2020
Makuna	Baigana, Buhagana, Paneroa, Wuhána, Yeba–masã, Yehpá Majsá, Yepá–Mahsá	Macuna	Amazonas, Colombia	636 (Brazil: 108, Colombia: 528)	2017
Makurap	Makuráp, Macuráp, Macurapi, Makurápi, Massaka	Makurap	Rondônia	579	2014
Manchineri	Machinere, Machineri, Manitenerí, Maxinéri, Yine	Machinere	Acre, Bolivia, Peru	1,460 (Bolivia: 38, Brazil: 1,332, Peru: 90)	2020
Marubo	Kaniuá, Marova, Marúbo	Marúbo	Amazonas	2,008	2014
Matipu	Matipuhy, Mariape-Nahuqua	Matipuhy	Mato Grosso	189	2020
Matis	Matsë, Mushabo, Deshan Mikitbo	Matis	Amazonas	529	2020
Matsés	Mayoruna	Matsés	Amazonas, Peru	4,200 (Brazil: 1,700, Peru: 2,500)	2016
Maxakali	Kumanuxú, Maxacalí, Tikmuún, Tikmu'un	Maxakalí	Minas Gerais	2,407	2020
Mbya	Bugre, Mbiá, Mbua, Mbyá, Mbayá, Guarani Mbya	Mbyá Guaraní	Argentina, Paraguay, ES, PA, PR, RJ, RS, SC, SP, TO	30,569 (Argentina: 2,147, Brazil: 7,000, Paraguay: 21,422)	2012
Mebêngôkre Kayapó	Kayapo, Caiapó, Kayapó, Kokraimoro, Mebengôkre	Kayapo	Mato Grosso, Pará	9,762	2014
Mehinako	Meinako, Mehinaco, Meinacu, Meinaku	Mehinaku	Mato Grosso	341	2020
Menky Manoki	Munku, Menku, Myky, Manoki	Iranxe (Myky dialect)	Mato Grosso	131	2020
Migueleno		Wanyam	Rondônia	267	2014
Miranha	Bora, Boro, Miraña, Mirãnia	Boran	Amazonas, Colombia	2,130 (Brazil: 1,685, Colombia: 445)	2020
Mirity-tapuya	Buia-tapuya	Miriti	Amazonas	94	2017
Mukurin			Minas Gerais		
Munduruku	Mundurucu, Maytapu, Cara Preta, Wuyjuyu	Munduruku	Amazonas, Pará	17,997	2020
Mura		Mura	Amazonas	18,511	2020
Nadöb	Macú Nadob, Maku Nadeb	Nadëb	Amazonas	483	2014
Nahukuá	Nauquá, Nahukwá	Kuikúro (Kalapalo dialect)	Mato Grosso	169	2020
Nambikwara	Anunsu, Nambiquara	Nambikwara	Mato Grosso, Rondônia	2,332	2014
Naruvoto		Kuikúro	Mato Grosso	81	2003
Nawa	Náua	Náwa	Acre	535	2020
Nukini	Nuquini	Nukini	Acre	726	2020
Ofaié	Ofayé, Ofaié-Xavante	Ofayé	Mato Grosso do Sul	69	2014
Oro Win	Oro-uin	Oro Win	Rondônia	88	2014
Palikur	Paricuria, Paricores, Palincur, Parikurene, Parinkur-Iéne, Païkwené	Palikúr	Amapá, French Guiana	2,655 (Brazil: 1,935, French Guiana: 720)	2020
Panará	Kreen-Akarore, Krenhakore, Krenakore	Panará	Mato Grosso	704	2022
Pankaiuká			Pernambuco	150	2011
Pankará			Pernambuco	3,080	2020
Pankararé	Pancararé	Portuguese	Bahia	1,648	2014
Pankararu	Pancaré, Pancaru, Pankarará, Pankararú	Portuguese (Pankararú)	Mato Grosso, Pernambuco, São Paulo	8,184	2014
Pankaru	Pankararu-Salambaia	Portuguese	Bahia	123	2020
Parakanã	Awaeté	Parakanã	Pará	2,042	2020
Paresí	Arití, Halíti	Paresi	Mato Grosso	2,138	2014
Parintintin	Cabahyba	Kawahiva (Parintintin dialect)	Amazonas	480	2014
Patamona	Ingarikó, Kapon	Kapóng	Guyana, Roraima	5,838 (Brazil: 338, Guyana: 5,500)	2020
Pataxó	Patachó, Patashó, Pataso	Pataxó	Bahia, Mato Grosso	12,865	2020
Paumari	Pamoari	Paumarí	Amazonas	1,804	2014
Pipipã			Pernambuco	1,391	2013
Pira-tapuya	Piratapuya, Piratapuyo, Piratuapuia, Pira-Tapuya, Waíkhana	Piratapuyo	Amazonas, Colombia	1,156 (Brazil: 756, Colombia: 400)	2020
Pirahã	Mura Pirahã, Hiaitsiihi	Mura (Pirahã)	Amazonas	592	2014
Pitaguary	Potiguara, Pitaguari	Portuguese	Ceará	3,623	2014
Potiguara	Potyguara, Pitiguara	Portuguese	Ceará, Paraíba, Pernambuco, Rio Grande do Norte	18,445	2014
Puruborá		Puruborá	Rondônia	243	2014
Puyanawa	Poianáua, Puinahua	Poyanawa	Acre	745	2014
Rikbaktsa	Aripaktsa, Canoeiro, Erikbatsa, Erikpatsa	Rikbaktsa	Mato Grosso	1,600	2020
Sakurabiat	Mequéns, Sakiriabar, Sakurabiat	Mekéns	Rondônia	219	2014
Sateré Mawé	Sateré-Maué, Mawé	Mawé	Amazonas	16,312	2020
Shanenawa	Katukina Shanenawa	Shanenawa	Acre	769	2020
Siriano	Sarirá, Siriana, Siriane, Surianá, Surirá, Suryana	Siriano	Amazonas, Colombia	751 (Brazil: 86, Colombia: 665)	2014
Surui Paiter	Suruí, Paiter	Surui	Mato Grosso, Rondônia	1,375	2014
Suruwahá	Zuruahã	Zuruahá	Amazonas	171	2014
Tabajara			Ceará, Piauí	3,279	2020
Tapajó			Pará	241	2020
Tapayuna	Tapayúna, Beiço de pau, Kajkwakratxi	Tapayuna	Mato Grosso, Pará	432	2024
Tapeba	Perna-de-pau, Tapebano		Ceará	7,038	2020
Tapirapé	Apyãwa	Tapirapé	Mato Grosso, Tocantins	917	2020
Tapuio	Tapuya, Tapuia		Ceará, Goiás, Piauí, Rio Grande do Norte	369	2020
Tariana	Taliáseri, Tariano, Tariáno, Tarîna	Tariana	Amazonas, Colombia	2,889 (Brazil: 2,684, Colombia: 205)	2014
Taurepang	Taulipang, Taurepangue, Taulipangue, Pemon	Pemon	Roraima, Venezuela	28,006 (Brazil: 849, Venezuela: 27,157)	2020
Tembé	Tenetehara	Tenetehara (Tembe)	Maranhão, Pará	2,096	2020
Tenharim	Kagwahiva	Kawahiva (Tenharim dialect)	Amazonas	828	2014
Terena	Etelena, Terêna	Terêna	Mato Grosso, Mato Grosso do Sul, São Paulo	26,065	2014
Ticuna	Magüta, Tikuna, Tukuna	Ticuna	Amazonas, Colombia, Peru	72,553 (Brazil: 57,571, Colombia: 8,000, Peru: 6,982)	2020
Tingui Botó	Tingui-botó, Carapató, Dzboku’a, Dzubukuá, Karapató, Tingui	Portuguese	Alagoas	407	2020
Tiriyó	Tirió, Tarona, Yawi, Pianokoto, Wü tarëno, Txukuyana, Ewarhuyana, Akuriyó	Tiriyó	Pará, Suriname	3,921 (Brazil: 2,076, Suriname: 1,845)	2020
Torá		Portuguese (Torá)	Amazonas	330	2014
Tremembé		Portuguese (Tremembé)	Ceará	3,837	2020
Truká		Portuguese (Truká)	Bahia, Pernambuco	3,233	2020
Trumai	Trumái	Trumai	Mato Grosso	260	2020
Tsohom-dyapa	Tyohom-dyapa	Tsohom Djapá	Amazonas	38	2016
Tukano	Daxsea, Tukána, Tucano, Ye´pâ-masa	Tucano	Amazonas, Colombia, Venezuela	12,090 (Brazil: 5,731, Colombia: 6,330, Venezuela: 29)	2014
Tumbalalá		Portuguese	Bahia	1,381	2020
Tunayana		Waiwai	Amazonas, Pará	107	2010
Tupari		Tupari	Rondônia	607	2014
Tupinambá		Portuguese (Tupi)	Bahia, Pará	7,656	2020
Tupiniquim	Tupinikim, Tupinaki, Tupinikim, Tupinikin	Portuguese	Espírito Santo	3,278	2020
Turiwára	Turiuara	Turiwára	Pará	30	1995
Tuxá	Todela, Tusha	Portuguese (Tuxá)	Alagoas, Bahia, Minas Gerais, Pernambuco	1,703	2014
Tuyuka	Dochkafuara, Doka-Poara, Doxká-Poárá, Tuiuca, Tuyuca, Utapinopona	Tuyuca	Amazonas, Colombia	1,620 (Brazil: 1,050, Colombia: 570)	2014
Umutina	Omotina, Balatiponé	Umotína	Mato Grosso	515	2014
Uru-Eu-Wau-Wau	Jupaú	Kawahiva (Uru-Eu-Wau-Wau dialect)	Rondônia	127	2020
Waimiri-Atroarí	Atroahy, Atroaí, Atroarí, Atrowari, Atruahí, Ki’nya, Waimiri Atroari, Kinja	Waimiri-Atroarí	Amazonas	2,394	2022
Waiwai	Wai-wai, Ouayeone, Uaieue, Uaiuai	Waiwai	Amazonas, Guiana, Pará, Roraima	2,861 (Brazil: 2,691, Guiana: 170)	2020
Wajãpi	Wayapi, Wajapi, Oiampi	Wayampi	Amapá, French Guiana, Pará	2,562 (Brazil: 1,612, French Guiana: 950)	2020
Wajuru	Wayoró, Ayurú, Uaiora, Wajaru, Wayurú, Ajurú	Wayoró	Roraima	248	2014
Wapishana	Wapichana, Wapixana, Uapixana	Wapishana	Roraima, Guiana, Venezuela	17,346 (Brazil: 11,309, Guiana: 6,000, Venezuela: 37)	2020
Warekena	Uarekena	Warekena	Amazonas, Venezuela	1,659 (Brazil: 1,039, Venezuela: 620)	2014
Wariʼ	Pakaa Nova, Waricaca', Uari, Orowari,	Wariʼ	Rondônia	4,461	2020
Wassu	Uassu, Wasu	Portuguese (Wasu)	Alagoas	2,014	2014
Wauja	Uauja, Waurá, Waujá	Waurá	Mato Grosso	672	2020
Wayana	Uaiana, Upurui, Roucouyen, Orkokoyana, Urucuiana, Urukuyana, Alucuyana	Wayana	French Guiana, Pará, Suriname	1,674 (Brazil: 374, French Guiana: 800, Suriname: 500)	2020
Witoto	Uitoto	Witoto	Amazonas, Colombia, Peru	7,887 (Brazil: 84, Colombia: 5,939, Peru: 1,864)	2014
Xakriabá	Xacriaba	Xakriabá	Minas Gerais	8,867	2014
Xavante	A´uwe	Xavante	Mato Grosso	22,256	2020
Xerente	Xerentes, Akwê	Xerénte	Tocantins	3,964	2020
Xetá		Xeta	Paraná	69	2020
Xikrin	Caiapós-xicrin, Kayapó Xikrin, Mebengôkre	Kayapo (Xikrin dialect)	Pará	2,267	2020
Xipaya	Xipaia	Yuruna, Xipaya	Pará	241	2020
Xokleng	Xoclengue, Aweikoma	Xokleng	Santa Catarina	2,153	2020
Xokó	Xocó	Portuguese (Xocó)	Sergipe	340	2014
Xukuru		Portuguese (Xukuru)	Pernambuco	8,481	2020
Yaminawá	Yaminawa	Yaminawa	Acre, Bolivia, Peru	2,684 (Bolivia: 630, Brazil: 1,454, Peru: 600)	2014
Yanomami	Ianomâmi	Yanomami	Amazonas, Roraima, Venezuela	41,731 (Brazil: 30,390, Venezuela: 11,341)	2023
Yawalapiti	Iaualapiti	Yawalapití	Mato Grosso	309	2020
Yawanawá	Iauanauá	Yawanawa	Acre, Bolivia, Peru	1,305 (Bolivia: 132, Brazil: 849, Peru: 324)	2020
Ye'kwana	Ye'kuana, Yekuana, Yequana, Maiongong, Soto	Yeꞌkuana	Roraima, Venezuela	8,678 (Brazil: 681, Venezuela: 7,997)	2020
Yuhupdeh	Yuhupdeh, Yuhupdëh	Hup	Amazonas, Colombia	1,308 (Brazil: 1,058, Colombia: 250)	2020
Yudja	Jurúna, Iuruna, Jaruna, Yudjá, Yudya, Yurúna	Yuruna	Mato Grosso	950	2020
Zo'é	Poturu	Zoʼé	Pará	331	2022
Zoró	Pangyjej	Zoro	Mato Grosso, Rondônia	787	2020

== See also ==
- List of Indigenous territories (Brazil)
