= Piripkura =

Indigenous people of Brazil

Total population
- 3

Regions with significant populations
- Brazil (Mato Grosso)

Languages
- Kawahib language

Religion
- traditional tribal religion

Related ethnic groups
- Amondawa, Capivarí, Jiahúi, Karipúna, Tenharim, Parintintin, Juma

The Piripkura are an Indigenous tribe who inhabit the Piripkura Indigenous Territory in Mato Grosso, Brazil. They are one of the last isolated Indigenous groups in the Amazon rainforest. Violence and deforestation have led to significant losses, with many tribe members killed by illegal loggers in the 1980s. Although the 2022 Brazilian census only counts 1 living member, 3 members are known: two men, Pakyî and Tamandua, and a woman, Rita Piripkura, who is married to an Indigenous man of Karipúna ethnicity, at Rondonia.

== History ==
The Piripkura tribe is one of the last remaining isolated Indigenous groups in the Amazon rainforest, with only three known survivors. Once comprising a village of over 100 individuals with similar technological practices as neighboring tribes, the tribe experienced a drastic decline in population for unclear reasons. According to anthropologists, most of the Piripkura population, estimated at 20 individuals when FUNAI first contacted them in 1989, fell victim to slaughter by illegal loggers in the 1980s as they exploited the forest's resources. Rita, one of the three known survivors, has recounted accounts of violence and massacres perpetrated against the tribe, including the decimation of a Piripkura village.

During this time, Pakyî killed two of Rita's children, both under five years old. In 1985, Rita fled to a cattle ranch owned by the Penço family, where she experienced abuse and exploitation. In 1989, she participated in an expedition with uncontacted tribes expert Jair Candor, which led to the discovery of Pakyî and his nephew Tamandua, the only remaining members of the tribe.

It has been noted that Pakyî and Tamandua have not always been their names, indicating that their names have changed over time. Pakyî is also referred to as Baita. Further details about this renaming process are not provided. The two have lived in isolation within the Amazon rainforest for decades, with minimal contact with the outside world. They rely on traditional hunting and gathering techniques for sustenance. Two Piripkura men, Mande-í and Tucan, emerged in 1998, recounting their people's past abundance and subsequent massacre by outsiders.

Towards the end of 2018, Tamandua, in his forties, received a diagnosis of a brain cyst, requiring hospitalization in São Paulo for surgery. He faced complications post-surgery, leading to intensive care. Pakyî, aged just over 50, also required medical attention for prostate issues. Following their recovery, both returned to their territory.

=== Piripkura Indigenous Territory ===
In 2008, FUNAI published the initial ordinance restricting access and land use in the Piripkura's territory, covering 243,000 hectares.

The Piripkura people's land in Mato Grosso state has faced encroachment from ranchers and loggers, leading to conflicts over land rights. While the government initially sided with loggers, under a leftist administration in 2007, it reversed its stance and protected 242,500 hectares of forest for Pakyi and Tamandua. This designation aimed to safeguard their territory from deforestation and encroachment by loggers and ranchers. The protected area sparked anger among landowners who acquired the land cheaply from the government in prior years to encourage economic development. The landowners, led by the Penço family, contested the protections, claiming that Pakyi and Tamandua don't require such extensive land and accusing the government of impeding logging under the guise of Indigenous rights. Francisco Penço, their spokesperson, described the Indigenous pair as pawns in an environmentalist agenda.

The Piripkura's forest suffered the highest deforestation rate among uncontacted tribes' territories in Brazil in 2020. It is suspected that additional members of the tribe reside within the territory, having withdrawn deeper into the forest.

On May 12, 2021, a federal judge in Brazil ordered the formation of a task force to fully demarcate the Piripkura reserve. Demarcation grants legal protection to indigenous territories in Brazil. The court decision also mandates FUNAI to maintain a permanent team to prevent illegal incursions into the reserve. On September 17, 2021, FUNAI renewed a protection order for the Piripkura tribe's ancestral lands in the Amazon rainforest. The renewal, lasting six months, was a departure from previous three-year extensions. Advocates expressed concern over the short-term renewal, fearing it signaled a potential end to protection. Federal prosecutors urged the government to extend protection orders for Indigenous groups facing similar threats.

In November 2021, an overflight revealed that the territory of the Piripkura was being illegally invaded and deforested for beef production. This act violated a 6-month Land Protection Order issued earlier in September. The campaign "Uncontacted or Destroyed" organized by COIAB, OPI, APIB, ISA, and Survival International highlighted the deforestation, construction of infrastructure, and introduction of cattle into the territory. Reports indicated that the rate of deforestation had increased dramatically, with more than 12,000 hectares already destroyed. The invasion posed a significant threat to the survival of the Piripkura, including potential violence against its surviving members.

== Culture ==
It is unknown how the Piripkura refer to themselves as. They are referred to as "Piripkura", meaning the "butterfly people", by the neighboring Gavião people due to their constant forest movements.

The Piripkura tribe speaks a Kawahib language of Tupian family.

Pakyî and Tamandua craft hammocks from bark, set traps to hunt tapirs, and construct shelters using the broad leaves of the babaçu tree.

== In media ==
In Piripkura, a 2017 documentary film directed by Mariana Oliva, Renata Terra, and Bruno Jorge, government agent Jair Condor, from the Ethno-Environmental Protection Front, embarks on a mission to locate Pakyî and Tamandua, two of the last three surviving members of the Piripkura tribe. The expedition aimed to verify their existence to the government, crucial for extending the protective ordinance over their territory since 2008. A review in the European Review of Latin American and Caribbean Studies describes the film as a "touching picture and an essential film for those who want to understand the imminent danger that Indigenous communities and their environments face in Brazil". It highlights that the film portrays the two Piripkuras not as "artifacts from an idealized past, but as men who have been fighting for their survival for decades, with only a machete, a blind ax, and a torch" but notes that the film's reliance on Condor's and Rita's accounts has limitations for understanding broader political and historical contexts. A review in The Atlantic states that "Piripkura shows great humility in seeing Indigenous people not as curious relics of some long-ago time, but simply as people who want to live freely, to live apart" and praises the film's "rough style" for offering a transparent view of the two men.
