= Xai =

Xai, XAI or xAI may refer to:

== Technology ==
- Explainable artificial intelligence, in artificial intelligence technology
- SpaceXAI, formerly xAI, an American artificial intelligence company

== Other uses ==
- Xai-Xai, a city in the south of Mozambique
- Xinyang Minggang Airport (IATA airport code: XAI), in Xinyang, China
- Kaimbé language (ISO 639-3 language code: xai), an extinct language in Brazil
