= Caratiú =

Karatiús
Total population
- 0 (extinct)

Regions with significant populations
- Brazil

Languages
- Tupi

Religion
- Animism and Shamanism

Related ethnic groups
- Kanindés

The Karatiús were an indigenous ethnic group that inhabited the region of the Ibiapaba and Joaninha mountain ranges, in the Brazilian state of Ceará. The term Karatiú likely originates from the tupi word Cará, a fish of the Pterophyllum genus, and tiú, meaning dark.

The Karatiús died out in the 18th century due to genocide and expansion of Portuguese settlers into their lands. They left a genetic heritage in the current inhabitants of the region, as well as several geographic names that stem from their language.
