= Anambe =

Anambe or Anambé may refer to:

- Anambé people, an ethnic group of Brazil
- Anambé language, a language of Pará, Brazil
- Anambé of Ehrenreich, an extinct language of Maranhão, Brazil

== See also ==
- Amambai
