= Tiquié River =

River in Amazonas, Brazil

- Location within Brazil Location within Colombia

Location
- Country: Brazil, Colombia

Physical characteristics
- Source
  - location: Amazon River, Amazonas, Brazil
  - coordinates: 0°5′35.81″N 68°32′20.11″W
- Mouth
  - location: Vaupés River, Vaupés, Colombia
  - coordinates: 0°15′12.4″N 70°2′52.7″W
- Length: 374 km (232 mi)

The Tiquié River is a tributary stream of the Vaupés River. It runs between the Vaupés and the state of Amazonas, in the border region between Colombia and Brazil. It is a blackwater river. Its length is 374 km according to satellite measurements. It originates in Colombian territory and runs 321 km (199 mi) through Brazil.

== Geography ==
The terrain around the Tiquié River is mainly flat. It is located in a valley and rises 77 m (253 ft) above sea level. The Tiquié flows into São Gabriel da Cachoeira, forming Lake Mucum in the Vaupés with a surface area of 35 square kilometers. The highest point nearby reaches 114 m (374 ft) and 1.2 km (0.75 mi) southwest of the Tiquié River. In the upper Tiquie, the mainland forest predominates, while in the middle and lower course of the river, the catinga predominates. The vegetation typical of the flooded lands known as igapó abounds, especially in the lower course.

The tropical jungle climate prevails in the area. The average annual temperature in the area is 22 °C. The warmest month is January, when the average temperature is 23 °C, and the coldest is May, with 21 °C. The wettest month is February, with an average of 515 mm of precipitation, and the wettest October is dry, with 211 mm of precipitation. The average annual precipitation is 2,900 to 3,600 millimeters.

The Tiquié basin is inhabited by the indigenous peoples Macuna, Tuyuca, Tukano, Bará, Desano, Hudpa and Yuhupdeh.
