= Kawahíva language =

Tupi-Guarani language cluster of Brazil

Kawahíva
- Kagwahiva, Kawahib
- Native to: Brazil
- Region: Mato Grosso and Rondônia
- Ethnicity: (see varieties below)
- Native speakers: 560 (2024)
- Language family: Tupian: Tupí–Guaraní; Kawahib (VI); Kawahíva
- Dialects: Tenharim; Diahoi; Parintintin; Juma; Uru-Eu-Wau-Wau; Amondawa; Karipuna; Piripkura; Capivarí †; Paranawat †; Ipotewát †; Takwatíp †; Morerebi (unattested); ?Mialat † (unattested); ?Jabotiféd † (unattested); ?Tukumanfed † (unattested); ?Pawaté † (unattested)

Language codes
- ISO 639-3: Variously: pah – Tenharim–Parintintín urz – Uru-eu-wau-wau kuq – Karipuná (confuses Kawahib with Jau-Navo) jua – Júma xmo – Morerebi tkf – ? Tukumanféd (unattested) paf – Paranawát adw – Amondawa
- Glottolog: kawa1296
- ELP: Karipuna
- Júma
- Linguasphere: 88-AAG

Kawahíva (Kawahíb, Kagwahib) is a Tupi–Guarani dialect cluster of Brazil.

The Tenharim (self-designation, Pyri 'near, together'), Parintintín, Jiahúi, Amondawa, Karipúna, (Note: not to be confused with either the Panoan group or the Carib-based creole spoken in the state of Amapá, which have the same name.) Uru-eu-wau-wau (self-designation Jupaú), Piripkúra, Júma, and Capivarí all call themselves Kawahíva. Their speech is mutually intelligible, and also similar to other languages or dialects now extinct. The closest Tupí-Guaraní language seems to be Apiaká, formerly spoken in Mato Grosso.

== Varieties ==
There are different internal classifications of the pan-Kawahíwa, which differ in, e.g., whether Kayabí and Apiaká should be included as part of the dialectal cluster. The one listed in Aguilar (2013, 2018) follows:

- Kawahíwa
  - Northern
    - Parintintin
    - Tenharim
    - Diahói
    - Juma
  - Southern
    - Jupaú (Uru-Eu-Wau-Wau)
    - Amondawa
    - Karipuna
    - Apiaká
    - Kayabí (Kawaiwete)
    - Piripkura
    - isolated groups (Note: Dialects of uncontacted peoples)

Languages spoken in north-central Rondônia are Karipúna, Uru-eu-wau-wau (Jupaú), Amondawa, and unidentified varieties by some isolated groups. Languages spoken in northeastern Mato Grosso and southern Pará are Apiaká, Kayabí, Piripkúra, and unidentified varieties by some isolated groups.

Other Kawahíva dialects became extinct, the most recent being Capivarí with the death of Pitanga Capivarí in the fall 2022. Other varieties include Paranawat at Machado/Ji-Paraná River, Takwatip and Ipotewat at Muqui river, attested by Nimuendajú and Lévi-Strauss around the 1950s. Lévi-Strauss also mentions people who were already almost extinct at that time, who lived near the Ji-Paraná river, like the Tucumanfét and the Jabotiféd; and the Mialat, who inhabited the Leitão River region.

== Phonology ==
Phonemic inventory of the Parintintin dialect:

Vowels
	Front	Central	Back
High	i ĩ	ɨ ɨ̃	u ũ
Mid	e ẽ		o õ
Low		a ã	

- /a, ã/ are heard as [ə, ə̃] in unstressed syllables.

Consonants
	Bilabial	Alveolar	Palatal	Velar		Glottal
	Bilabial	Alveolar	Palatal	plain	labial	Glottal
Nasal	m	n	ɲ	ŋ	ŋʷ	
Stop/Affricate	p	t	t͡ʃ	k	kʷ	ʔ
Fricative	β					h
Rhotic		ɾ				

- /ɲ/ can be heard as [j] when in unstressed positions.
- /β/ can also be heard as [w].
