= Euclides da Cunha, Bahia =

Municipality of Bahia, Brazil

Coordinates: 10°30′28″S 39°0′50″W

Euclides da Cunha
- Municipality
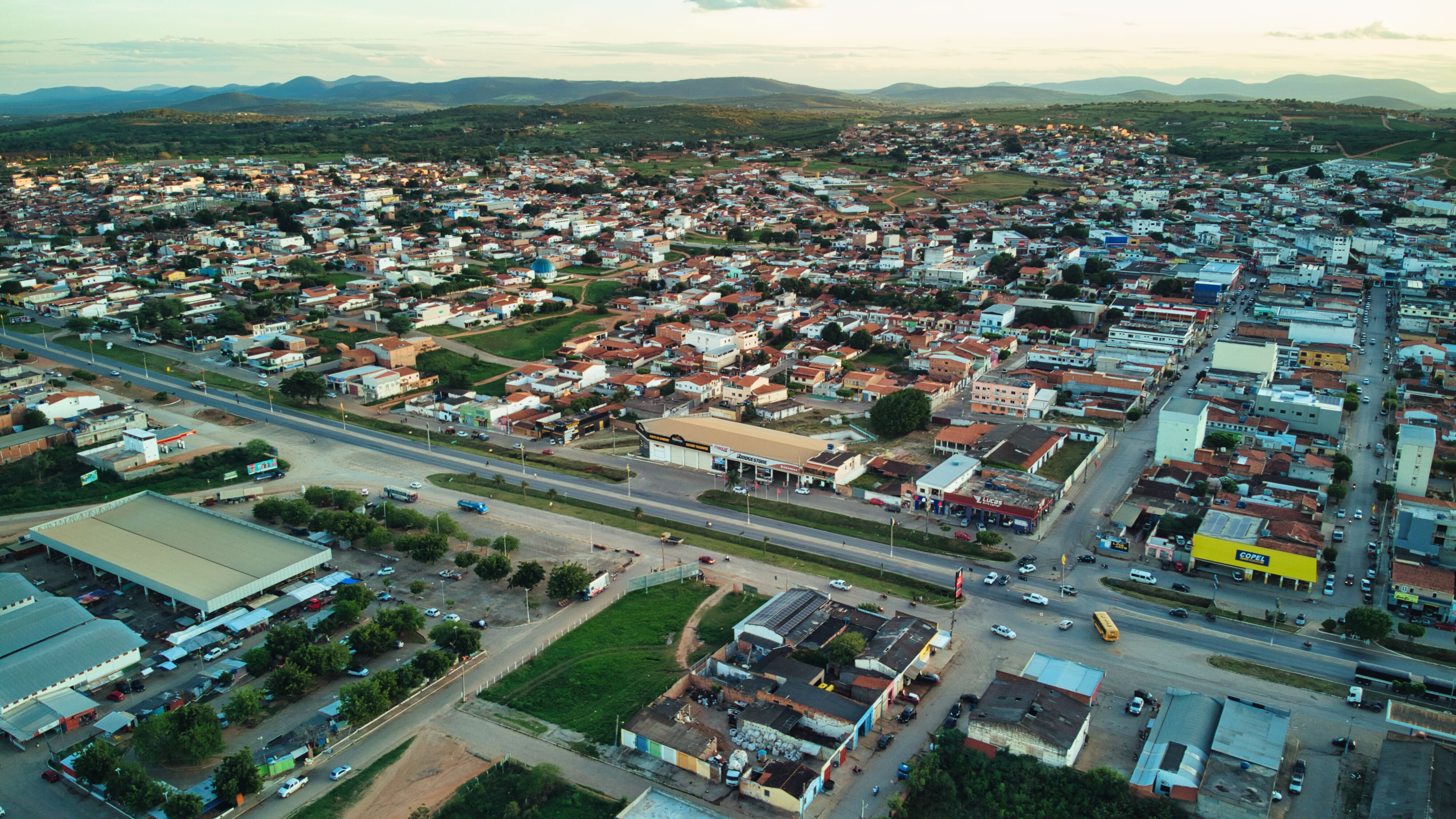

- Flag Coat of arms
- Nickname: Cumbe
- Interactive map of Euclides da Cunha
- Country: Brazil
- Region: Nordeste
- State: Bahia

Population (2020)
  - Total: 60,858
- Time zone: UTC−3 (BRT)

Euclides da Cunha is a municipality in the state of Bahia in the North-East region of Brazil.

== History ==
The Masakara language and Kaimbé language, both now extinct, were once spoken in the municipality.

== Districts ==
- Massacará (created on December 30, 1953)
- Aribicé (created on November 5, 1985)
- Caimbé (created on November 5, 1985)
- Ruilândia
