= Juma people =

Native people of Brazil

Júma
Total population
- 3 (2021); Mixed ancestry: 14 (2021)

Regions with significant populations
- Brazil (Amazonas)

Languages
- Juma

Religion
- Traditional tribal religion

Related ethnic groups
- Amondawa, Capivarí, Karipúna, Jiahúi, Parintintin, Piripkúra, Tenharim, and Uru-eu-wau-wau

The Júma are an Indigenous people of Brazil, who live in the Terra Indígena Juma in the Amazonas, along the Mucuim River, a tributary of Rio Açuã.

== Name ==
The Júma are also known as Kagwahibm, Kagwahiph, Kagwahiv, Kavahiva, Kawahip, Kawaib, and Yumá people.

== Population ==
In the 18th century, the Juma numbered between 12,000–15,000 people. The Juma numbered 300 in 1940. In 1998, there were only four Juma people. As of 2021, there are 17 descendants of Aruká's, the last elder Juma member, who died from COVID-19 in 2021 in Porto Velho.
