= Teofilândia =

Coordinates: 11°29′20″S 38°59′52″W

- Municipality
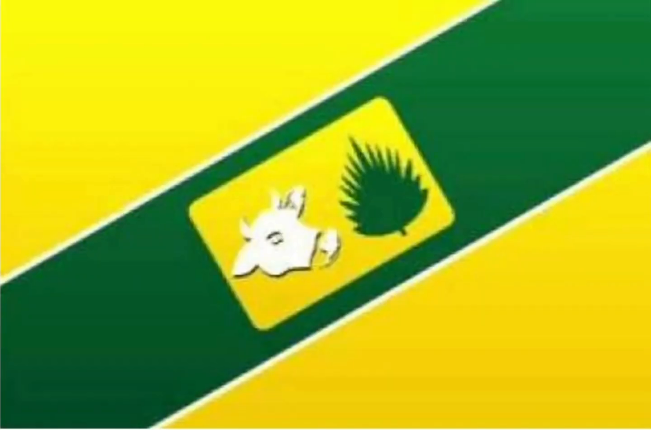
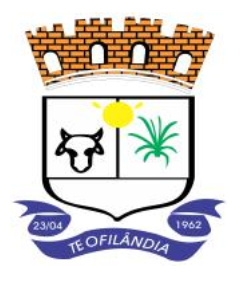
- Flag Coat of arms
- Interactive map of Teofilândia
- Country: Brazil
- Region: Nordeste
- State: Bahia

Population (2020)
  - Total: 22,555
- Time zone: UTC−3 (BRT)

Teofilândia is a municipality in the state of Bahia in the North-East region of Brazil.

== See also ==
- List of municipalities in Bahia
