= Parintintín =

Kagwahiv Parintintin
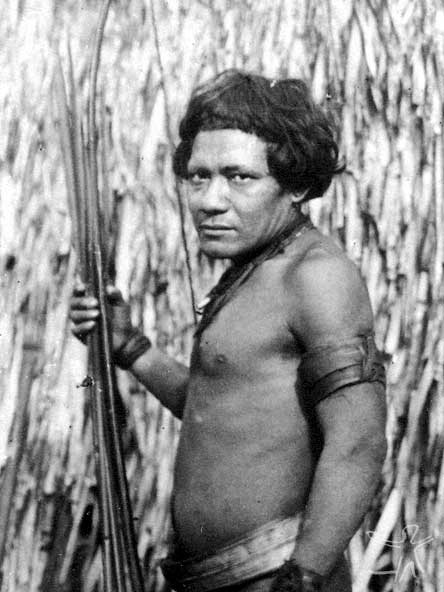
- Parintintin man, ca. 1920s

Total population
- 418 (2010)

Regions with significant populations
- Brazil (Amazonas)

Languages
- Parintintin, Portuguese

Related ethnic groups
- Tenharim, Diahhoi

The Parintintin are an Indigenous people who live in Brazil in the Madeira River basin. They refer to themselves as Cabahyba, Kagwahiva’nga, or Kagwahiva, which translates to "our people."

As of 2010, the Parintintin have a population of around 418 and live in three villages on two different Indigenous territories (TIs):

- TI Ipixuna 215,362 hectares (2,154 km^{2}; 832 sq mi), and
- TI Nove de Janeiro 228,777 hectares (2,288 km^{2}; 883 sq mi).

== Language and culture ==
The Parintintin language is a dialect of the Tenharim language, which belongs to the Tupi-Guarani language family. It is written in the Latin script.

Parintintin people are argicultalists, fishermen, and gatherers. Their social structure is based on two moieties that are exogamous and named for different types of birds. They are a patrilineal society.

While they refer themselves as Kagwahib, which translates to "our people", the name Parintintín comes from the language of the Munduruku, allies of the Brazilians for much of the 19th century, meaning "enemy".

== History ==
Following contact with Brazilians in 1946, a population of 4,000 at the time was eventually reduced to 120 after Brazil's second rubber boom and the construction of the Trans-Amazon highway in 1970. Further colonization of the Amazon basin led to the spread of diseases that the Parintintin were not prepared for.

== Current issues ==
The Parintintin currently face possible downstream impacts from the Madeira Hydroelectric Complex.

== See also ==
- List of Indigenous peoples in Brazil
