= Arara (Pará) =

Ukaragma, Ugoroŋmo

Total population
- 377 (2014)

Regions with significant populations
- Brazil (Pará)

Languages
- Arára, Portuguese

Religion
- Animism

The Arara people, also called Arara do Pará are an Indigenous people of Brazil, living in the state of Pará, Brazil. They are known for both their prowess in warfare and trophy-keeping practices, as well as their ability to interact with and accommodate non-native peoples. They maintained a nomadic existence and frequently intermarried with other tribes. The largest Arara settlement is Laranjal village.

== History ==
The Arara have been in contact with non-native peoples since the 1850s. They had peaceful encounters with outsiders along the Xingu and Iriri Rivers. From 1889 to 1894, they were harassed by rubber tappers.

== Language ==
Arara people speak the Arára language, also known as the Ajujure language, which is a Karib language. Its ISO 639-3 language code is "aap". A few Arara people also speak Portuguese.

== See also ==
- Indigenous peoples in Brazil
- List of indigenous peoples in Brazil
