= Colombian Brazilians =

Information on Colombians in Brazil

Colombians in Brazil
Colombianos en Brasil; Colombianos no Brasil

Total population
- 108,587 (2022)

Regions with significant populations
- Over 35% of Colombians in Brazil reside in the Southeast region, especially in the states of São Paulo and Rio de Janeiro. The largest concentration is found in São Paulo, followed by the Rio de Janeiro metropolitan area and the Federal District..

Languages
- Colombian Spanish, Brazilian Portuguese

Religion
- Christianity (Catholicism and Protestantism), minority Judaism

Colombian-Brazilians are Brazilians of full or partial Colombian ancestry, or Colombians residing in Brazil. Brazil has approximately 108,000 Colombian-Brazilians. In addition to Colombians who migrate to Brazil for work, there are also Colombian refugees (over 1,000 people), making them one of the largest refugee groups in the country.

== Population ==
According to estimates by the Colombian Ministry of Foreign Affairs, there were approximately 27,274 Colombians residing in Brazil in 2014, although Brazil’s national census conducted by IBGE (Brazilian Institute of Geography and Statistics) recorded only 6,851 in 2010. This discrepancy is attributed to underreporting at consulates and the informal or temporary nature of many migration flows.

United Nations data indicates that the number of Colombians living in Brazil reached 8,179 in 2015. The Colombian-Brazilian population includes labor and student migrants, as well as Colombian refugees, who numbered 1,288 people in 2016, making them one of the largest refugee groups in Brazil.

== Characteristics and Distribution ==
Most Colombians in Brazil reside in major urban centers such as São Paulo, Rio de Janeiro, Curitiba, Porto Alegre, and Belo Horizonte. There is also a significant population in border regions like Amazonas, particularly in Tabatinga, which borders the Colombian city of Leticia.

Colombians in Brazil are primarily active in the service sector, higher education, manufacturing, and hospitality and retail industries. A significant number are enrolled in Brazilian universities, supported by programs such as PEC-G, PAEC-OAS-GCUB, and other bilateral academic cooperation initiatives.

Distribution of Colombians in Brazil by State
State	Population	Reference
São Paulo	34,196	
Rio de Janeiro	9,629	
Minas Gerais	7,607	
Rio Grande do Sul	6,675	
Paraná	6,649	
Amazonas	6,354	
Santa Catarina	4,504	
Bahia	3,586	
Ceará	3,185	
Pará	3,173	
Pernambuco	3,144	
Distrito Federal	3,119	
Goiás	2,435	
Maranhão	2,160	
Roraima	1,846	
Espírito Santo	1,510	
Rio Grande do Norte	1,313	
Mato Grosso	1,104	
Piauí	1,046	
Mato Grosso do Sul	997	
Sergipe	925	
Paraíba	898	
Alagoas	715	
Rondônia	602	
Amapá	524	
Acre	349	
Tocantins	319	
Others	23	
Total	108,587	

== Academic and Labor Migration ==
Between 2007 and 2015, over 26,000 Colombians migrated to Brazil for education, with a 240% increase in these flows. In 2014, Brazil was the fifth most common destination for Colombian students, surpassing traditional destinations such as Australia and Canada.

Labor migration also increased by 33% during the same period, peaking at 12,716 Colombian workers in 2014. This mobility has been facilitated by agreements such as the Agreement on Residence for Nationals of Mercosur Member States, Bolivia, and Chile, to which Colombia is an associated state.

== See also ==
- Brazil–Colombia relations
- Colombian diaspora
- Immigration to Brazil
