= Tenharim language =

Dialect of Kawahíva

Tenharim
- Tenharin
- Native to: Brazil
- Region: Amazonas
- Ethnicity: Tenharim
- Native speakers: 350 (2024)
- Language family: Tupian: Tupí–Guaraní; Kawahib (VI); Tenharim

Language codes
- ISO 639-3: pah
- Glottolog: nucl1663
- ELP: Tenharín
- Linguasphere: 88-AAG-aa
- Tenharim is classified as Severely Endangered by the UNESCO Atlas of the World's Languages in Danger.

Tenharim (Tenharin) is one of the dialects of the Kawahíva language, one of the Tupian languages and spoken in western Brazil by the Tenharim. It is the only remaining dialect still transmitted to children.

== Geographical distribution ==
The Tenharim reside in three Indigenous territories (TIs), Tenharim/Marmelos, Tenharim of Igarapé Preto and Sepoti, within the village of Marmelos, Vila Nova, Bela Vista, Tracoá, Campinho, Taboca, Mafuí, Castanheira Jacuí, Pakyri, and Caranaí in the Brazilian state of Amazonas. Only in Tenharim Marmelos is the language being learned by children as a first language, who attend school and are educated in the Tenharim language; this approach has been described as "successful", though education in Tenharim is restricted to elementary school.

== History ==
=== Language contact ===
Along with Nheengatu, Tenharim has been proposed to be the source of personal pronouns in the Pirahã language. The idea that Pirahã borrowed its pronoun system from a Tupian language was first brought forward by Brazilian linguist Aryon Rodrigues.

Pirahã and Tenharim pronouns
gloss	Pirahã		Tenharim (Note: Pronouns given are in free form and in the ergative case)
gloss	Phonemic	Phonetic	Phonetic
first person	/ti/	[t͡ʃi]	[d͡ʒi]
second person	/gi/, /gia/	[nɪ], [nɪʔa]	[nde], [ne]
third person	/hi/ (Note: Masculine reference occurs with this pronoun when contrasted with /ʔi/)	[hɪ]	[ahe] 'people', 'person now dead'
third person feminine	/ʔi/ (Note: Pronoun not used in isolation)		[hea]
third person non-human	/ʔis/		

=== Documentation ===
Tenharim, along with other dialects of Kawahíva, was documented by Helen Pease and LaVera Betts, missionaries with the Summer Institute of Linguistics (SIL) from the 1960s to the 1980s. The two produced a pandialectal dictionary of Kawahíva, as well as a number of texts, mainly in Tenharim.

== Phonology ==
=== Consonants ===
Consonants
	Bilabial	Alveolar	Palatal	Velar		Glottal
	Bilabial	Alveolar	Palatal	plain	labial	Glottal
Obstruent	p	t	t͡ʃ	k	kʷ	ʔ
Fricative						h
Nasal	m	n	ɲ	ŋ	ŋʷ	
Approximant	ʋ	ɾ	j		w	

=== Vowels ===
Vowels
	Front		Back			
	Front		unrounded		rounded	
	oral	nasal	oral	nasal	oral	nasal
High	i	ĩ	ɨ	ɨ̃	u	ũ
Non-high	e	ẽ	a	ã	o	õ
