= Puruborá =

Purubora
Total population
- 209

Regions with significant populations
- Rondônia, Brazil

Languages
- Purubora

Religion
- Shamanism

The Puruborá are an indigenous people that inhabit the Brazilian state of Rondônia. They form a society of about 200 individuals.

== Localization ==
The Puruborá people inhabit the Aperoy village.

== Historical personalities ==
Emília Nunes de Oliveira Puruborá was matriarch of the Puruborá people, who by means of her persistence kept the culture and traditional territory, though they had to buy it.

== Language ==
Only 2 people can speak the Purubora language, as of 2015. It belongs to the Tupian language family.
