= Anacé =

Indigenous people of northeastern Brazil, traditional inhabitants of Ceará

Anacé

Total population
- 2,018 (as of 2014)

Regions with significant populations
- Brazil (Ceará)

Languages
- Portuguese (original language extinct)

Religion
- Traditional animism, Catholicism

Related ethnic groups
- Tremembé, Potiguara, Tapeba, Jenipapo-Kanindé

The Anacé are an Indigenous people of northeastern Brazil, whose traditional territory lies in the coastal and hinterland regions of Ceará, especially in the municipalities of Caucaia and São Gonçalo do Amarante.

== Territory and land struggles ==
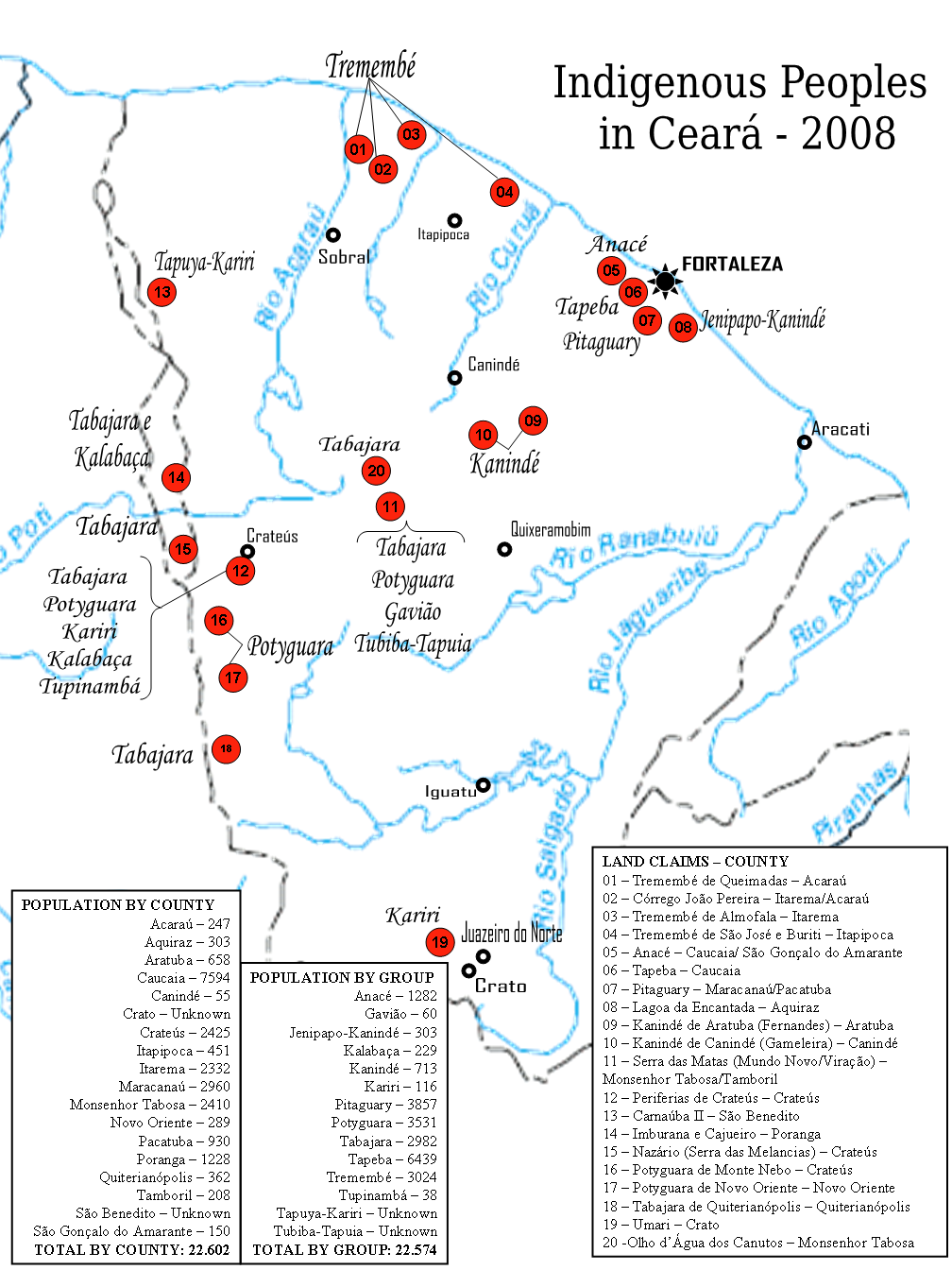
Map of several Indigenous peoples in Ceará

The Anacé are among the original inhabitants of the Ceará coast, historically known for their rivalry and alliances with other Indigenous groups and their resistance to Portuguese colonization.

Today, the Anacé live primarily in the communities of Japuara and Cauípe, in the municipality of Caucaia, as well as other settlements in Ceará. Their territory has not been fully demarcated by the Brazilian government, leading to ongoing land conflicts and threats from squatters, industrial projects, and state authorities.

Recently, the construction of the Industrial Complex and Port of Pecém brought new waves of displacement and environmental degradation. The installation of thermoelectric plants, steel mills, and water extraction projects has led to forced removals, pollution, and threats to the water security of Anacé communities. In response, the Anacé have organized retomadas (reclamations) - self-led land reoccupations - to reclaim parts of their ancestral territory, facing violent repression and intimidation.

== Culture and contemporary life ==
The Anacé have preserved elements of their traditional culture, including crafts, rituals, and community organization, despite the loss of their original language (now extinct). They practice a blend of Indigenous spirituality and Catholicism and maintain strong ties to the land and water sources that sustain their communities.
