= Uru-Eu-Wau-Wau dialect =

Variety of the Kawahib language

Uru-Eu-Wau-Wau
- Uru-Eu-Uau-Uau, Eru-Eu-Wau-Wau, Ureuwawau
- Jupaú
- Native to: Brazil
- Region: Rondônia
- Ethnicity: 152 Uru-Eu-Wau-Wau (2023)
- Native speakers: c. 60 (2024)
- Language family: Tupian: Tupí–Guaraní; Kawahib; Uru-Eu-Wau-Wau

Language codes
- ISO 639-3: urz
- Glottolog: urue1240
- ELP: Uruewawau
- Linguasphere: 88-AAG-ba

Uru-Eu-Wau-Wau (Uru-Eu-Wau-Wau: Jupaú) is one of the eight varieties of the Kagwahiva language, a Tupi–Guarani language, Subgroup VI. The name is also spelled Uru-Eu-Uau-Uau, Eru-Eu-Wau-Wau and Ureuwawau, and is sometimes known simply as Kagwahiva.

== Phonology ==
=== Consonants ===
Uru-Eu-Wau-Wau consonants
	Bilabial	Alveolar	Postalveolar	Palatal	Velar		Glottal
	Bilabial	Alveolar	Postalveolar	Palatal	plain	labial	Glottal
Stop/Affricate	p	t	t͡ʃ		k	kʷ	ʔ
Fricative	β						h
Nasal	m	n		ɲ	ŋ	ŋʷ	
Tap/flap		ɾ					

- /ɲ/ can be heard as [j] when in unstressed positions.
- /β/ can also be heard as [w].

=== Vowels ===
Uru-Eu-Wau-Wau vowels
	Front	Central	Back
High	i ĩ	ɨ ɨ̃	u ũ
Mid	e ẽ		o õ
Low		a ã	

- /a, ã/ are heard as [ə, ə̃] in unstressed syllables.

== Bibliography ==
- SAMPAIO, Wany Bernardete de Araujo. Estudo comparativo sincronico entre o Parintintin (Tenharim) e o Uru-eu-uau-uau (Amondava): contribuições para uma revisão na classificação das línguas tupi-kawahib. Campinas: Unicamp, 1977.
- SAMPAIO, Wany e SILVA, Vera. Estudo morfológico do sistema verbal da língua Uru-euuau-uau. Porto Velho: PIBIC/UNIR-CNPq. Junho/1996, 29 p. (relatório)
- SAMPAIO, Wany e ASSUNÇÃO, Giselle. Estudo do sistema pronominal da língua Uru-euuau-uau. Porto Velho: PIBIC/UNIR-CNPq. Junho/1996, 34 p. (relatório)
- SAMPAIO, Wany e ASSUNÇÃO, Giselle. Levantamento de dados linguísticos e culturais do povo Amondava. Porto Velho: PIBIC/UNIR-CNPq. Junho/1995, 81 p. (relatório)
- ALGUNS vocabulários dos Uru-eu-uau-uau. Porto Velho: CIMI-RO [s/d] (texto mimeografado)
