= Xikrin =

Indigenous people of the Brazilian Amazon

Xikrin, Put Karôt, Mebêngôkre

Total population
- 2267 (as of 2020)

Regions with significant populations
- Brazil (Pará, specifically Cateté and Bacajá river basins)

Languages
- Xikrin (Macro-Jê language family), Portuguese

Religion
- Traditional animism, Catholicism

Related ethnic groups
- Kayapó, Mebêngôkre, Juruna, Kuruaya

The Xikrin are an Indigenous people of the Brazilian Amazon, belonging to the Kayapó (Mebêngôkre) linguistic and cultural group. Their traditional territory spans the Cateté and Bacajá river basins in the state of Pará.

== Name and identity ==
The Xikrin refer to themselves as Mebêngôkre, meaning 'people of the water hole' or 'people of the big water', a name shared with other Kayapó groups. The term "Xikrin" was originally used by neighboring groups and became widely adopted. Historically, they also called themselves Put Karôt. Their language, Xikrin, belongs to the Macro-Jê family.

== Territory and villages ==
The Xikrin inhabit two main Indigenous Territories: Cateté and Trincheira Bacajá, both in Pará state. The Cateté area is drained by the Itacaiúnas and Cateté rivers and is rich in tropical forest, mahogany, Brazil nut trees, and babassu palms. The Trincheira Bacajá Indigenous Land, home to about 1067 Xikrin in 15 villages, covers 1.65 million hectares in the heart of the Amazon.

Villages are built close to rivers or creeks on well-drained land, with a central plaza surrounded by houses. The Men’s House (a communal, political, and ritual space) stands at the center. The Xikrin depend on the rivers for food, transportation, and cultural practices.

== History ==
The Xikrin are descendants of the larger Kayapó/Mebêngôkre group, whose oral histories trace their origins to the Tocantins and Araguaia rivers. The Xikrin of Cateté had their first formal contact with non-Indigenous people in 1952, and the Bacajá Xikrin in 1959. Early contact brought epidemics and population decline, but recent decades have seen demographic recovery, with the population rising from about 470 in the 1980s to over 2000 today.

== Social organization and culture ==
Xikrin society is organized around extended families and ceremonial societies. Festivals include the merêrêmei (beautiful festival), naming ceremonies, and initiation rites for boys and girls.

Traditional adornment includes feather diadems, shell necklaces, and body painting with annatto and charcoal. Boys undergo scarification and trials to mark their passage to adulthood. Women are known for their environmental stewardship.

== Economy and livelihood ==
The Xikrin practice slash-and-burn agriculture, growing sweet potato, yam, manioc, maize, pumpkin, papaya, banana, and cotton. They hunt, fish, and gather forest products such as Brazil nuts and medicinal plants.

== Environmental and political challenges ==
Xikrin territories are targets for illegal logging, mining, and land grabbing. The Cateté Xikrin have organized to defend their lands, forming associations such as the Bep-Nói Association and winning legal battles against timber companies. The Xikrin have also faced environmental contamination from mining operations, notably heavy metal pollution linked to nickel extraction.

Despite these pressures, the Xikrin continue to assert their rights and protect the Amazon, contributing to the preservation of one of the world’s most important ecosystems.
