= Xambioá =

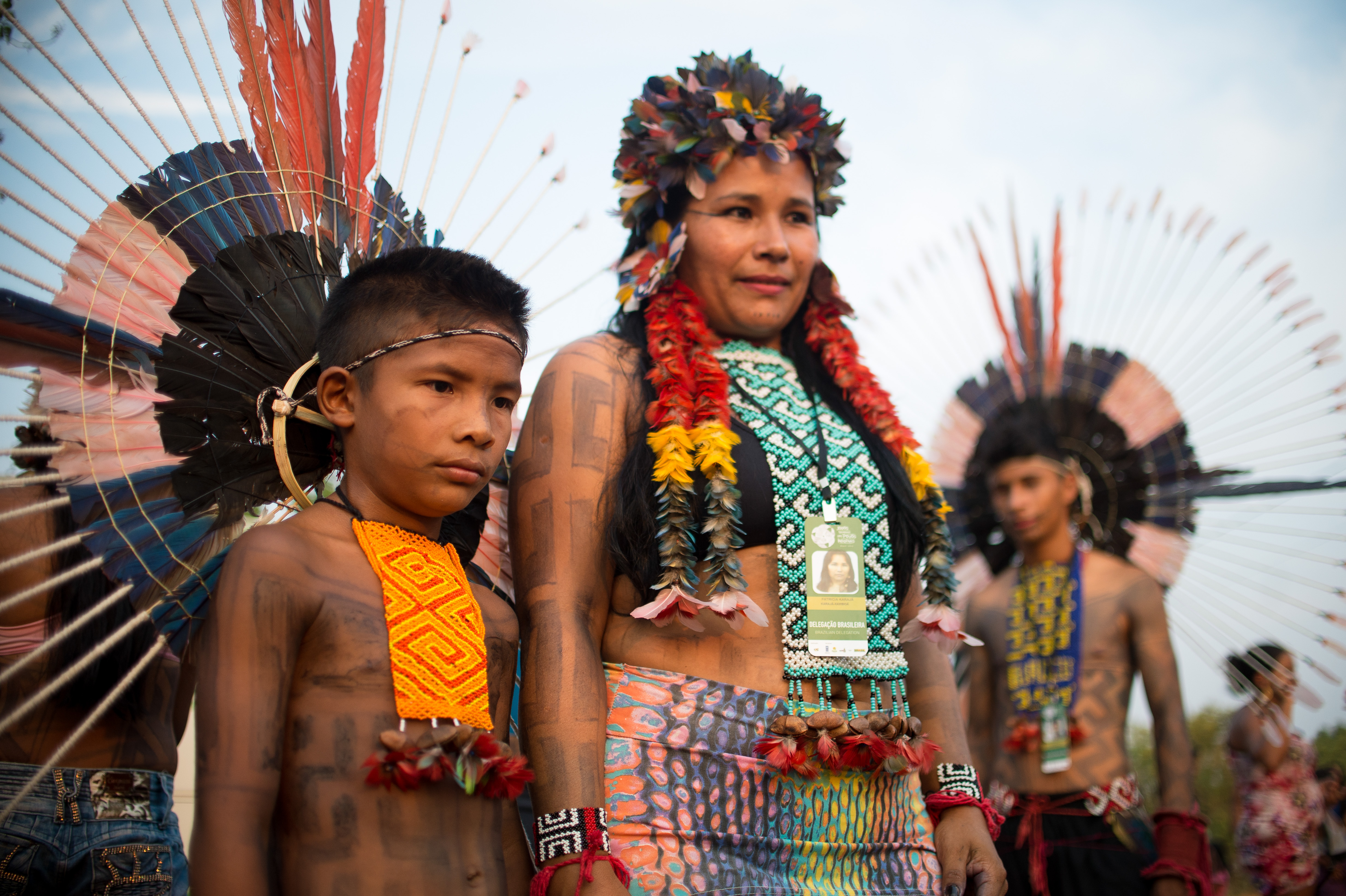

Total population
- 268 (2010)

Regions with significant populations
- Brazil

Languages
- Karajá

The Xambioá, also called the Karajá do Norte, Ixybiowa, or Iraru Mahãndu, are an Indigenous people who live in Tocantins, Brazil. The size of the present-day population does not reflect what it had been up to the end of the 19th century, when the Karajá do Norte numbered some 1,350 individuals. Since that time the group went through an extremely violent process of population loss, which reduced it to just 40 people in 1959. Karajá do Norte population is slowly beginning to recover. The present Karajá do Norte population is 268 people.
