= Juma dialect =

Nearly extinct dialect of Kagwahiva

Juma
- Kawahíva
- Native to: Brazil
- Region: Amazonas
- Ethnicity: 12 Juma (2024)
- Native speakers: 3 (2024)
- Language family: Tupian: Tupí–Guaraní; Kawahib; Juma

Language codes
- ISO 639-3: jua
- Glottolog: juma1249
- ELP: Júma
- Linguasphere: 88-AAG-ag

Júma (Arara-Kawahib) is one of the eight ethnic varieties of the Kagwahiva language, which belongs to Subgroup VI of the Tupi-Guarani languages. The most elderly native speaker, called Aruka Juma, died in 2021.

== Documentation ==
The language has been documented since 2019 through the recording of vocabulary lists, traditional narratives, everyday stories, etc. Some of the texts can accessed through the website of the Survey of California and Other Indian Languages.

== Phonology ==
=== Consonants ===
		Bilabial	Alveolar	Palatal	Velar	Glottal
Nasal		m	n		ŋ	
Stop	voiceless	p	t		k	ʔ
Stop	voiced				ɡ	
Fricative						h
Approximant				j	w	
Rhotic			ɾ			

=== Vowels ===
	Front	Central	Back
High	i ĩ	ɨ ɨ̃	u ũ
Mid	ɛ ɛ̃		ɔ ɔ̃
Low		a ã	

There are no supersegmentals, including stress.
