= Tapeba =

Indigenous people of Brazil

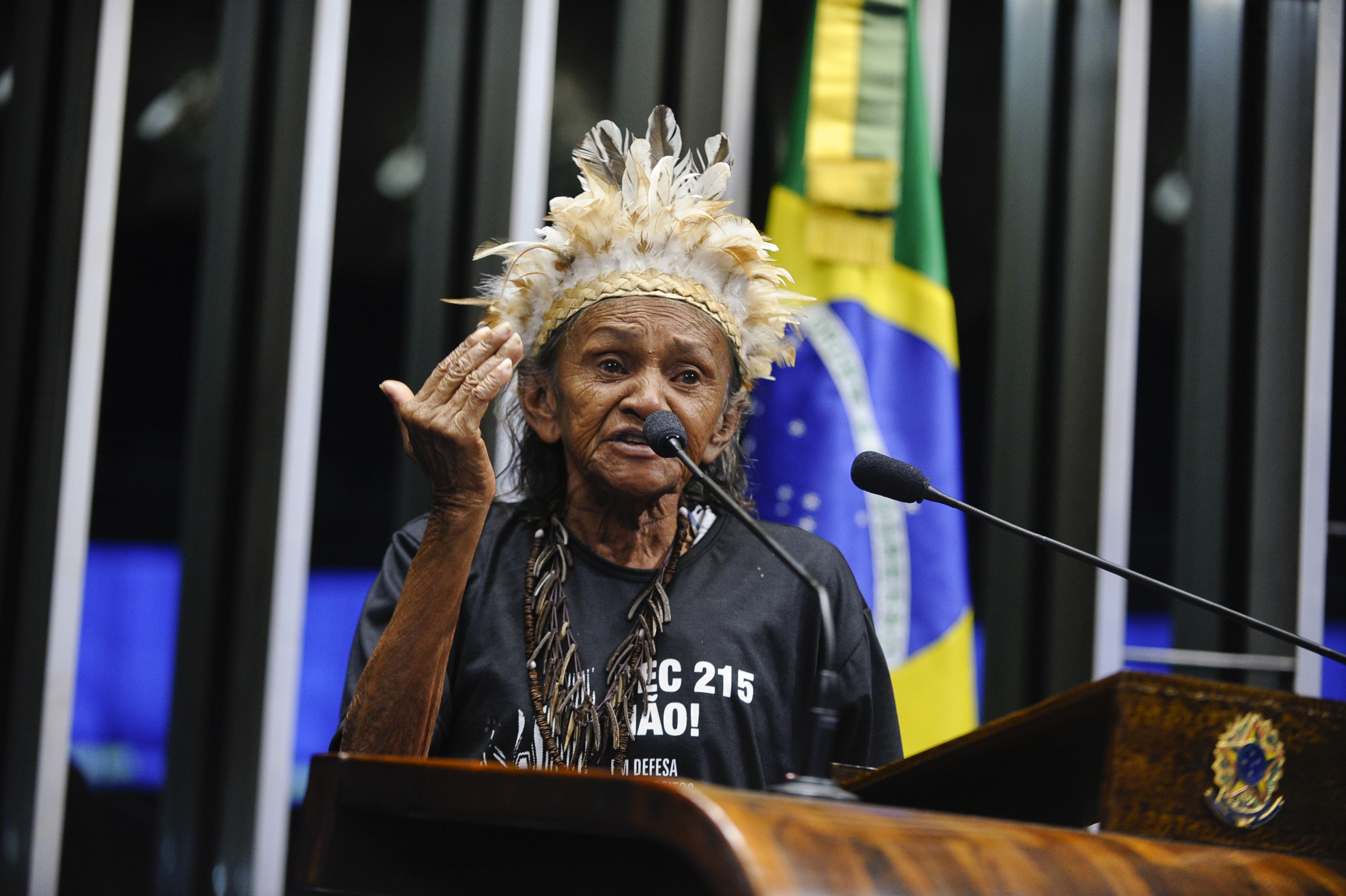
- Tapeba pajé (shaman) Raimunda Tapeba

Total population
- 6,600 (2010)

Regions with significant populations
- Brazil, Ceará

Languages
- Portuguese

Related ethnic groups
- Tupi people

The Tapeba people are an Indigenous people of Brazil, who formed from the remnant populations of tribes around the aldeia of Nossa Senhora dos Prazeres de Caucaia in Ceará, Brazil. They are native Portuguese-speakers and are also known as Tapebano and the Perna-de-pau people.

Before official recognition as an Indigenous people in 1993, they were classified as caboclo peasants. They trace their descent from the Potiguara, Tremembé, Cariri, and Jucá peoples, who spoke Tupi languages.

== Etymology ==
The term "Tapeba" itself is of Tupi origin, from the name itapeva 'flat rock, level rock, polished rock'.

== Background ==
The Tapeba people live on federally identified and delimited, but still not fully demarcated, Indigenous lands in Caucaia, Ceará, in the Brazilian Northeast. In addition to Indigenous blood, most Tapeba have significant European and, to a lesser extent, African racial heritage. Before their official recognition by Brazil's Foundation for the Indian in the 1990s, they had little history as a coherent Indigenous identity. It was through prodding by Fortaleza's Archbishop Lorscheider, who was moved by their wretched poverty, that they organized in the 1980s and sought state recognition, which in Brazil often comes attended by lands demarcations, legal eviction of competing land occupants, and privileged access to healthcare, education and other state services. Before the 1980s, there are no historical registrations of a "Tapeba" people anywhere in Brazil.

To contextualize this, the Tapeba are one of about 50 groups presently living in Brazil's Northeast—where Indians are generally thought to be extinct because of this region's early colonial incursions—that have reemerged as political entities since the 1970s. Without exception, these groups seek official recognition and legal recourse to a better material existence, at the center of which are almost invariably violent turf wars with white landholders. In fact, many such groups in Bahia, Sergipe and Alagoas are racially Afrobrazilian.

== Current issues ==
As for the Tapeba, while they have significant Indigenous blood ties and have for generations been an agricultural society threatened by the urban growth of Ceará's capital, Fortaleza (which now subsumes Caucaia in the western outskirts of its metropolitan area), they also are Portuguese-speakers with a long history of variably peaceful and violent interactions with European-Brazilians. Before the 1990s, they were classified as caboclos (mixed-race peasants), a stigmatizing mark of non-citizenship in Brazil, and deemed to be squatters along the Ceará River and nearby mangroves. Converting their identity to that of Indians has reduced that stigma, provided a coherent identity that has been instrumental in raising youth consciousness within the community, and most importantly, brought legal access to material resources they would otherwise lack. Additionally, some of their expressive traditions, the best-known of which is their Toré dance ritual, can be said to be recent cultural adoptions (some might even argue they are inventions in the Hobsbawmian sense), intended primarily to further their Indigenous identity claims.
