= Yuhupdeh =

Indigenous people of north-west Amazon

Yuhupdëh, Yuhup

Total population
- 1,308 (as of 2020)

Regions with significant populations
- Brazil (Amazonas), Colombia (Amazonas Department, Vaupés)

Languages
- Yuhup (Nadahup language family), Portuguese, Spanish

Religion
- Traditional animism, some Christian influence

Related ethnic groups
- Hupda, Dâw, Nadëb (Nadahup peoples)

The Yuhupdeh (also Yuhup, Yuhupdëh) are an Indigenous people of the Northwest Amazon, whose traditional territory spans the interfluvial forests between the Tiquié and Apapóris rivers, in the border region of Brazil (Amazonas) and Colombia (Amazonas, Vaupés).

== Name ==
The Yuhupdeh - which means simply pessoas (people) - used to be denominated as Maku meaning índios do mato (forest indians), but this term is now considered pejorative as it is more commonly be translated as gente sem fala (people without speak).

== Territory and population ==
The Yuhupdeh territory covers interfluvial areas between the Tiquié and Apapóris rivers, with communities distributed across Brazil and Colombia. In Brazil, they are concentrated in the Alto Rio Negro Indigenous Territory (Amazonas), especially in communities along the Castanha, Cucura, Samaúma, Ira, and Cunuri streams. In Colombia, they inhabit the Yaigojé Apaporis Indigenous Reserve and areas near the Ugá and Jotabeyá streams.

Population estimates range from about 1,000 to 1,300 people, with roughly 1,058 in Brazil and 250 in Colombia. The Yuhupdeh are highly mobile, often moving between communities and maintaining extensive networks of kinship and exchange with neighboring Indigenous groups.

== Language and relations ==
The Yuhupdeh speak Yuhup, a language of the Nadahup family, and are closely related to the Hupda, Dâw, and Nadëb peoples. They are traditionally forest dwellers, known for their autonomy, but also participate in the broader social and ritual systems of Northwestern Amazonia, including the Dabucuri and Jurupari ceremonies.

== History ==
The Yuhupdeh largely avoided early colonial impacts due to their preference for remote interfluvial regions. More sustained contact began in the mid-20th century, driven by the rubber boom, the arrival of traders and missionaries, and the establishment of Salesian missions. These encounters led to cycles of migration, dispersal, and return, as groups sought to avoid exploitation and epidemics.

Missionaries introduced schooling and attempted to suppress traditional rituals, but Yuhupdeh communities continued to practice male initiation, music, and ritual life, adapting to changing circumstances.

== Social and economic life ==
Traditionally semi-nomadic, the Yuhupdeh rely on hunting, fishing, gathering, and small-scale agriculture. They are skilled in the use of forest resources, including the making of curare (plant-based arrow poison). In recent decades, many families have settled in permanent or semi-permanent communities, often in proximity to Tukano, Tuyuka, Makuna, and Desana peoples.

Trade with neighboring groups and participation in regional markets—especially in São Gabriel da Cachoeira—have become increasingly important, with families traveling by river to obtain goods and social benefits.
