= Amondawa dialect =

Dialect of Kawahiva

Amondawa
- Amundava
- Native to: Brazil
- Region: Rondônia
- Ethnicity: 130 Amondawa (2017)
- Native speakers: 81 (2017); 10 passive bilinguals (2017)
- Language family: Tupian: Tupi-Guarani; Subgroup VI; Kawahíva; Amondawa

Language codes
- ISO 639-3: adw
- Glottolog: amun1246
- Linguasphere: 88-AAG-aj

Amondawa is one of the 8 living varieties of the Kagwahiva language, a Tupi–Guarani language of the state of Rondônia in Brazil. It is spoken by 81 of the Amondawa people, who numbered 130 in 2017. There are also 10 passive bilingual speakers who can only understand the language but not speak it. Amondawa children are no longer learning the language, resulting in its endangerment and possible future extinction. Other sources report that Amondawa is being taught in schools in the region, however. The Amondawa language lacks numerals above four and its speakers do not have an abstract sense of time, leading to media outlets reporting the Amondawa as "the tribe without time".
