= Turiwára =

Indigenous people of Brazil

Turiwára or Turiuara are an Indigenous people of Brazil, living in the states of Pará and Amazonas. In 1995, their population was 30. Their language, Turiwára, which belongs to subgroup VIII of the Tupi-Guarani languages, is extinct.
