= Bará people =

Indigenous people of Colombia and Brazil

Bará
Regions with significant populations
- Colombia: 1,008 (2018)
- Brazil: 30 (2014)

Languages
- Waimajã

Religion
- Traditional religion

Related ethnic groups
- Tucano, Tuyuca, and Barasana

The Bará (also called Waímajã and Waípinõmakã) are an Indigenous people originating from the northwest of the Amazon rainforest, which lives in the headwaters of the Tiquié River, above the village of Trinidad and in the upper Igarapé Inambú (tributary of the Papurí River that goes to the Vaupés River) and the upper Colorado and Lobo (tributaries of Pira-Paraná that goes to Apaporis).

The Bará are an exogamous phratry identified as "pez people" (Waí mahã) and conformed to eight patrilineal clans. They form part of a regional cultural system of linguistically differentiated exogamous phratries. They speak an Eastern Toucan language, as well as the languages of exogamous ethnic groups or phratries, which form part of this regional system of the Vaupés, based on marriage exchange between them. The wives and mothers of each, as well as the husbands, and children of the sisters of the members of a phratry or linguistic unit do not belong to the same. In practice each person speaks several languages, in addition to the language of their unit or fraternity.

== Social organization ==
The Bará live in communal houses or "malocas" 20 m wide by 40 m long, with a main door to the north, for men and another to the south for women, with a central area used for dances.

== Culture ==
The economy of the Bará combines shifting agriculture, hunting and fishing. The main crop of the chagra is cassava, next to which they plant various species. They complement the diet with the collection of wild fruits and insects. The women are in charge of the pottery and the men the basket weaving. They are skilled makers of carrying baskets and canoes. Currently they are the main specialists in the making of feather decorations used in large ceremonies.

An important ritual is the dabucuri, during which visitors arrive with meat and fish and the hosts offer them cassava chicha, an important manifestation of reciprocity in which the sacred instrument, the yurupari, is played, as in the initiation ritual of men.
