= Truká language =

Extinct language of Brazil

Truká
- (unattested)
- Native to: Brazil
- Region: Pernambuco, Bahia
- Ethnicity: 3,233 Truká (2020)
- Extinct: late 20th century
- Language family: unclassifiable

Language codes
- ISO 639-3: tka
- Glottolog: truk1242

Truká is an extinct and unattested, but presumed, language of Brazil. The ethnic population is about 3,200.

It was originally spoken in the Ilha da Assunção archipelago of the São Francisco River in Cabrobó, Pernambuco State.
