= Apiaká language =

Extinct Tupi language of Brazil

Apiaká
- Native to: Brazil
- Region: northern Mato Grosso, upper Rio Tapajos
- Ethnicity: 1,000 Apiacá
- Extinct: 10 April 2011, with the death of Pedrinho Kamassuri; 3 rememberers (2016)
- Revival
- Language family: Tupian: Tupi–Guaraní; Kawahib; Kagwahiva; Apiaká
- Dialects: Apiaka proper (†); Wirafed †

Language codes
- ISO 639-3: Either: api – Apiacá wir – Wiraféd
- Glottolog: apia1248 Apiaká wira1264 Wiraféd
- ELP: Apiaká
- Linguasphere: 88-AAG-ca
- 88-AAG-ea
- Apiaká is classified as Critically Endangered according to the UNESCO Atlas of the World's Languages in Danger

Apiaká is a recently extinct Tupi language of the Apiacá people of the upper Rio Tapajos area of Mato Grosso, Brazil. It has been supplanted by Portuguese, and only 3 people have some knowledge of the language.

== Classification ==
The Apiaká language belongs to subgroup VI of the Tupi-Guarani languages. It is very close to Kagwahiva and may be a dialect of that language.

== History ==
After coming into contact with the Neo-Brazilians, the Apiaca language changed with combined elements of the Lingua Geral, A Tupi-based trade jargon. Today, Portuguese or Munduruku are more widely spoken as opposed to the Apiaca language, though these people have always been known by the name "Apiaca."

All the Apiacá speak Portuguese and those married to members of the Munduruku and Kaiabi tribes speak their spouse's language fluently or have the ability to understand them fully. Although the Munduruku and Kaiabi languages and idioms are spoken on a day-to-day basis in the Apiaca villages, they are, however, limited to domestic spaces and informal conversations. The language used in formal conversations is Portuguese, due to contact with the Neo-Brazilians and Portuguese settlers. Although they cannot impose their own language on the co-resident Munduruku and Kaiabi people, due to such a small number of them who actually speak the Apiaca language, the Apiaca manage to impede the languages of these peoples from becoming the official languages in their villages. This allows Portuguese to function as an instrument of resistance employed by the Apiaca to prevent their cultural absorption by the Munduruku and Kaiabi tribes.

Despite the linguistic proximity, the Apiaká do not allow Kaiabi to be taught in their villages' schools, this stems from historically bad relations with this tribe, however, due to the better relationship the Apiaca have with the Munduruku people, they permit Munduruku teachers to give lessons in their own language. For many years the Apiaca have been attempting to revive their language through the schools in their villages but have so far been unsuccessful. In recent years there has been an initiative to create a book known as the "Apiaca Word" in order to catalog the language.

== Extinction ==
The last fluent heritage speaker of Apiaká, Pedrinho Kamassuri, died in hospital in Juara, Mato Grosso, on April 10, 2011. It is unknown how many partial speakers still live as of 2018.
