= Kaxixó =

Indigenous people of Minas Gerais, Brazil

The Kaxixó are an Indigenous people of Brazil, located mainly in the Martinho Campos as well as the Pompéu municipalities of the state of Minas Gerais, Brazil. There are 301 Kaxixó as of 2014, who are dispersed over a wide area around the Kaxixó aldeia (village). The Kaxixó mostly work as field hands and servants for landholders.

The Kaxixó are recognized by the Brazilian government since 2001. They have been seeking recognition over the past decades, although local land holders have opposed this recognition. The Kaxixó claim the farm owners oppose Kaxixó recognition because recognition will give the Kaxixó more leverage with the local farm owners they work for.
