= Kaimbé language =

Extinct unclassified language of Brazil

Kaimbé
- Native to: Brazil
- Region: Bahia
- Ethnicity: 1,135 Kaimbé (2020)
- Extinct: early 20th century
- Language family: unclassified

Language codes
- ISO 639-3: xai
- Glottolog: kaim1235

Kaimbé is an extinct unclassified language of eastern Brazil. The ethnic population numbered an estimated 1,100 to 1,400 in 1986. The language is scarcely attested; in 1961 one elder was able to remember a few single words mixed with Kiriri.

The district of Caimbé in Euclides da Cunha, Bahia is named after the tribe.

== Vocabulary ==
Kaimbé words collected from an elderly rememberer in Massacará, Euclides da Cunha, Bahia by Wilbur Pickering in 1961:

| Portuguese gloss (original) | English gloss (translated) | Kaimbé |
|---|---|---|
| fogo | fire | ˈlumi |
| fumo | smoke | buzʌ̨ |
| ave, (tipo aracuão?) | bird (rufous-vented ground cuckoo?) | kʷakʷι |
| barraco | house, shed | toˈkaya |
| caça (gambá?) | wild game (possum?) | koˈřoa |
| deus | God | ˈme͜utipʌ̨ |
| rede | net | kiˈsε |
