= Kanindé =

Kanindés
Canindés

Total population
- 1,101 (2014)

Regions with significant populations
- Brazil

Languages
- Costa Norte dialect of Portuguese, historically Tarairiú

Religion
- Roman Catholicism

Related ethnic groups
- Janduís, Paiacus and Tarairius

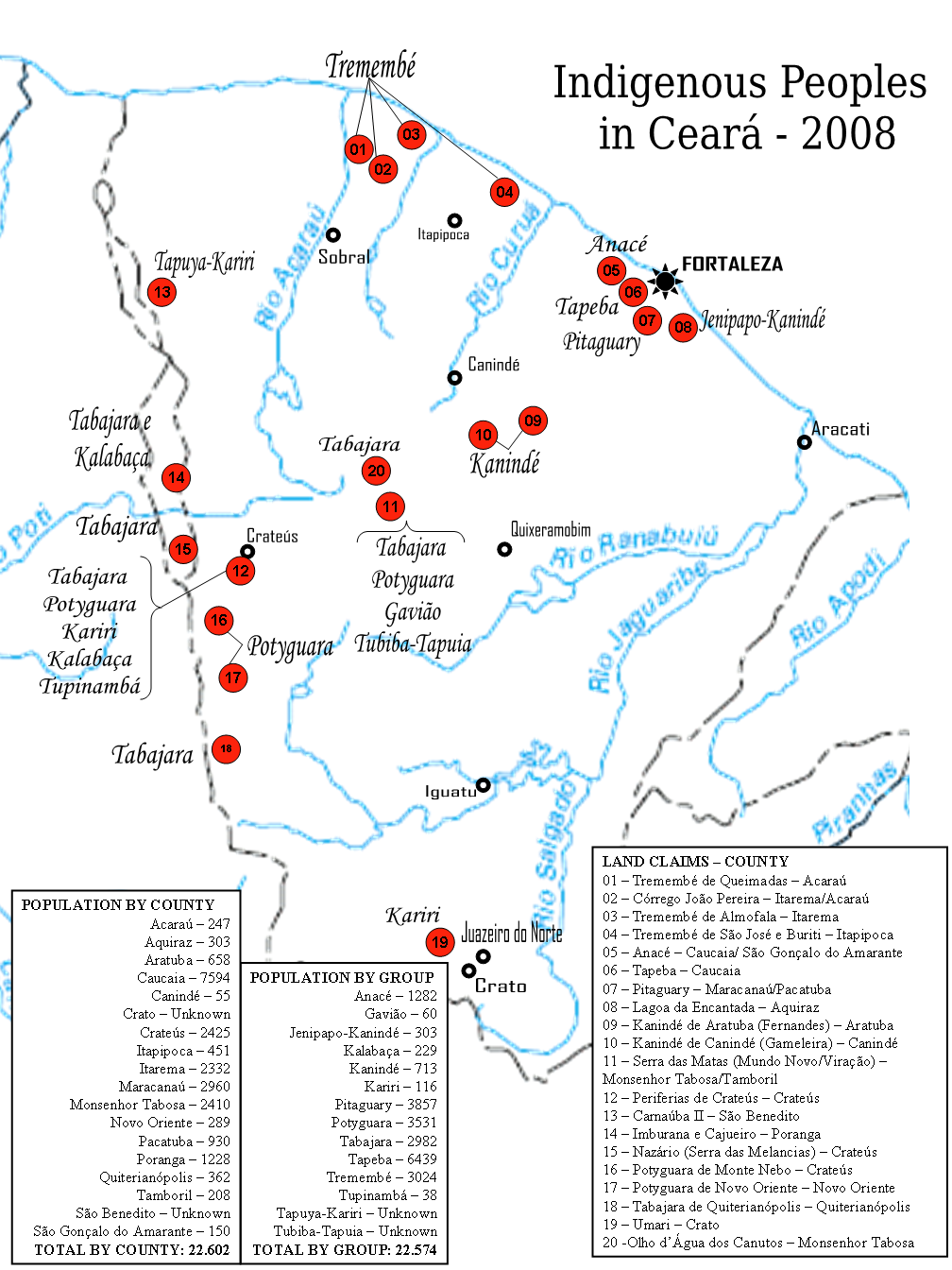
Map of Indigenous people in Ceará.

The Kanindés are an indigenous people that inhabit the Brazilian municipalities of Aratuba and Canindé, in the state of Ceará. As of 2014 they had a population of 1101 people. In the past, the Kanindés spoke the Tarairiú language, but their original language was replaced by Portuguese.

== History ==
The Kanindés are related to the Janduí and Paiacu people, composing a group of indigenous ethnicities that descend from the Tarairiu people. They receive their name from the tribal leader Canindé, who led the Kanindés in their fight against the Portuguese colonizers in the 17th century, forcing the king of Portugal to sign a peace with the tribe in 1692, with the treaty being later broken by Portuguese settlers.

Kanindé oral tradition claims the people originated in the region of the modern day municipality of Mombaça, migrating through the flow of the Curu river with Jenipapos-Kanindés, initially settling in Quixadá and then moving into the region they currently inhabit.

== Culture and way of life ==
The Kanindés were traditionally hunter-gatherers. Although they adopted agriculture, they still hunt animals such as mocós, tejos, pebas, deers, nambus, sariemas and juritis.
