= Anambé people =

Anambé
Total population
- 161 (2014)

Regions with significant populations
- Brazil (Pará)

Languages
- Anambé, Portuguese

Religion
- Animism

The Anambé are an Indigenous people of Brazil, living in the state of Pará, Brazil.

== History ==
The Anambé have been in contact with non-Natives since the 1842. In the 1940s, their population was 60. The population decreased due to the introduction of measles. Also many Anambé women married outside the tribe. The tribe has increased in population since the 1960s.

== Language ==
Anambé people speak the Anambé language, which is a Tupi language, belonging to the Tupi–Guarani language family, Subgroup VIII. Its ISO 639-3 language code is "aan". Only approximately seven people still speak Anambé today.
