= Tenharim =

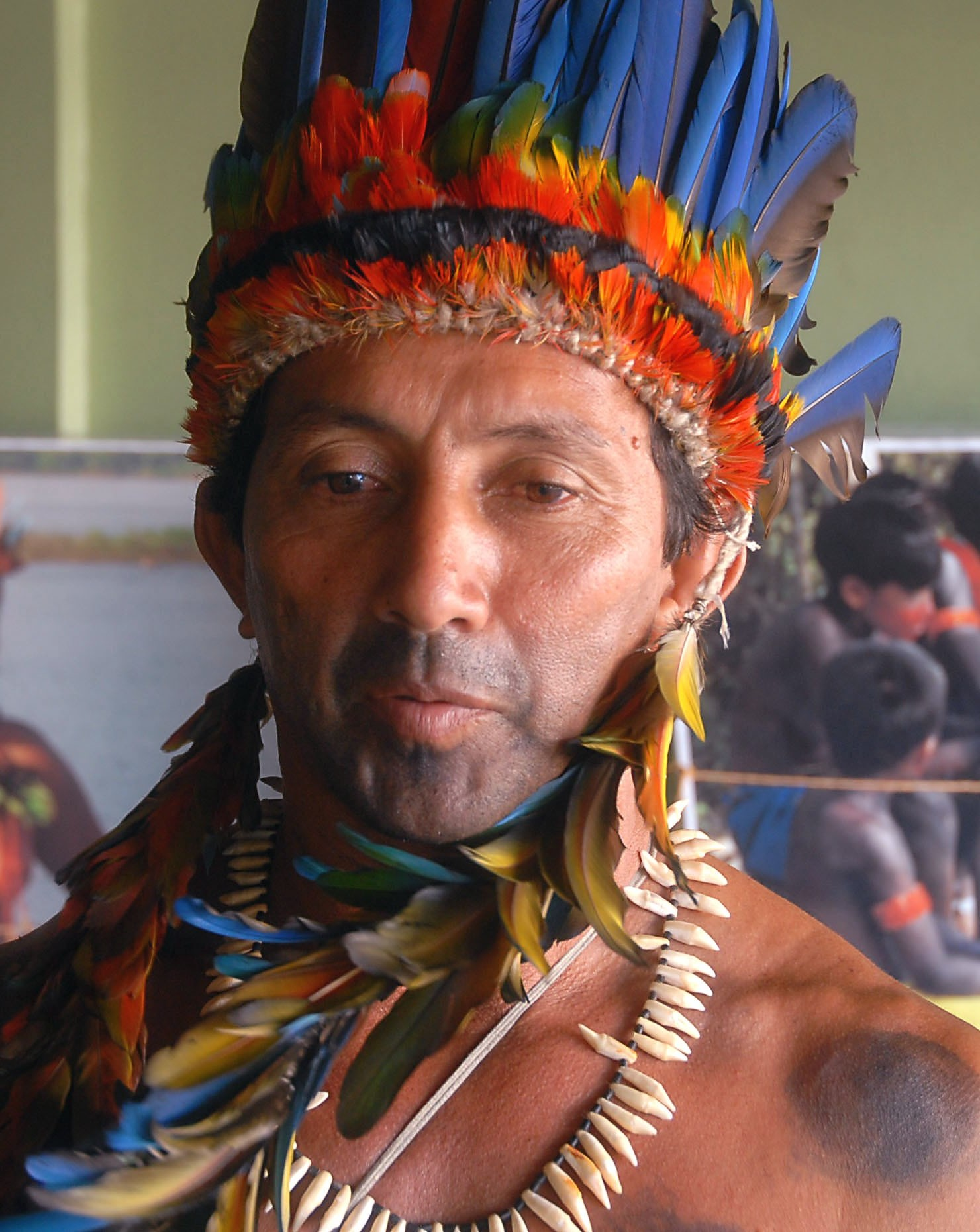

Total population
- 585

Regions with significant populations
- Brazil

Languages
- Tenharim (a Tupi–Guarani language)

The Tenharim are an Indigenous people of Brazil, living in the state of Amazonas.

== Name ==
Their self-denomination is Kagwahiva.
