= Wayampi language =

Tupian language spoken in South America

Wayãpi
- Wayampi
- Wajãpi
- Pronunciation: [wajãˈpi] ~ [wãjãˈpi]
- Native to: French Guiana, Brazil
- Ethnicity: Wayãpi
- Native speakers: (1,200 cited 2000)
- Language family: Tupian: Tupi–Guaraní; Northern; Wayãpi
- Dialects: Amapari Wajãpi; Guianese Wajãpi

Language codes
- ISO 639-3: oym
- Glottolog: waya1270
- ELP: Wayampí
- Linguasphere: 88-AAA-b

Wayãpi or Wayampi (Waiãpi, Guayapi, Oiampí, Wayampi: Wajãpi) is a Tupi–Guarani language spoken by the Wayãpi people. It is spoken in French Guiana and Brazil.

== Classification ==
Wayampi is a member of the Tupian language family. According to Brazilian linguist Aryon Rodrigues, it forms a subgroup with neighbouring Emerillon, as well as the Zoʼé, Kaʼapor (Urubú), Anambé, Guajá, Aurê–Aurá, and Takunyapé languages, termed Northern Tupi–Guarani. Wayampi and Emerillon are the only Tupian languages spoken in the region of the Guianas.

== Dialects ==
Two dialects of Wayampi are distinguished in the literature, Amapari Wayampi and Guianese Wayampi.

== History ==
The Wayampi migrated to their current area in the 18th century, similarly to the Zoʼé and Emerillon.

=== Documentation ===
The first documentation of Wayampi comes in a wordlist collected by Adam de Bauve and published in 1833 to 1834, followed by M. Leprieur in the same year. Both these wordlists were compiled in Carl Friedrich Philipp von Martius's (1867) book Glossaria linguarum brasiliensium. These were followed by Jules Crevaux's 93-word list recorded in 1875 and published in 1882.

== Phonology ==
=== Consonants ===
Wayampi has 13 consonant phonemes.

Consonant phonemes
	Labial	Alveolar	Palatal	Velar		Glottal
	Labial	Alveolar	Palatal	plain	lab.	Glottal
Nasal	m	n		ŋ ⟨ĝ⟩		
Plosive	p	t		k	kʷ ⟨kw⟩	ʔ ⟨'⟩
Fricative		s				h
Lateral		l				
Approximant	w		j			

/p/ cannot occur word-finally.

=== Vowels ===
Vowel phonemes
	Front	Non-front	
	Front	unrounded	rounded
Close	i ĩ	ɯ ɯ̃	u ũ
Mid	e ẽ		o õ
Open		a ã	

In closed, or consonant-final, syllables, /e, o/ are realized as [ɛ, ɔ]. /i/ is attested in only one open, or vowel-final, syllable, in awasi 'corn'. Nasal vowels are more common in stressed syllables.

== Orthography ==
Wayãpi is spelt phonetically based on the International Phonetic Alphabet, and not according the French orthography. The spelling uses the letter ɨ for the close central unrounded vowel between i and u. E is always pronounced é, vowels with a tilde are always nasal (ã, ẽ, ĩ, õ, ũ), ö is like the German O umlaut, and b is pronounced mb. All letters are pronounced.

== Bibliography ==
- Copin, François (2012), Grammaire wayampi (famille tupi-guarani), Université de Paris
- Grenand, Pierre; Grenand, Françoise Grenand (2017). "Pour une histoire de la cartographie des territoires teko et wayãpi (Commune de Camopi, Guyane française)". Revue d'ethnoécologie (in French). 11 (11). doi:10.4000/ethnoecologie.3007.
