= Xingu languages =

Language group

Xingu
- Tupi–Guarani subgroup V
- Geographic distribution: Brazil
- Linguistic classification: Tupian: Tupi–Guarani; Xingu
- Subdivisions: Anambé †; Amanayé †; Xingú Asuriní; Araweté; Ararandewara †; Aurá †

Language codes
- Glottolog: subg1264

The Xingu languages (also known as Tupi–Guarani V) are a subgroup of the Tupi–Guarani language family.

== Languages ==
The Xingu languages are:

- Anambé (of Cairarí)
- Amanayé
- Xingú Asuriní
- Araweté
- Aurá
- Ararandewara
