= Araweté =

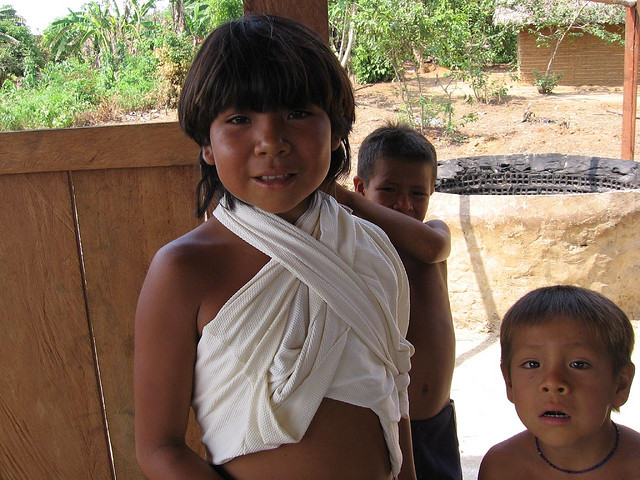
- Araweté children, 2005, photo by Avidd

Total population
- 467 (2014)

Regions with significant populations
- Brazil (Pará)

Languages
- Araweté, Portuguese

Religion
- Traditional tribal religion

The Araweté (also Arawate, Araueté or Bïde) are an Indigenous people of Brazil. They are swidden horticulturalists native to the state of Pará.

== Territory ==
The Araweté live on the Igarapé Ipixuna, a tributary of the Xingu River, near Altamira. They have one large village, surrounded by liana forests. They live on the Araweté/Igarapé Ipixuna Indigenous Land.

== History ==
The tribe could be the remnant of the Pacajá people, who fled into the rainforests to avoid missionaries. In 1950, the Araweté lived at the headwaters of the Bacajá River, but were pushed out by newly arrived Kayapó-Xikrin. They moved to the Xingu River and displaced the Asurini. The Arawaté first encountered Westerners during the 1960s, when their area was penetrated by fur traders pursuing big cats. These white traders were not viewed as a threat by the Araweté, but rather as a source from which to procure iron tools.

Accordingly, there are no written references to them produced prior to the 1970s. In 1976 and again in 1983 they were attacked by the Parakanã. Pressure from the Parakanã forced the Araweté to find more a secluded homeland.

The Trans-Amazonian Highway cut through the Xingu region in the early 1970s. Fundação Nacional do Índio (FUNAI) found the Araweté in 1976, suffering from introduced diseases and clashes with the Parakanã. The government agency relocated the tribe in a march through the thick jungle, resulting in 30 deaths. In 1978 they settled on their current homeland, where they cope with incursions by gold miners and timber companies. During the 1980s, the Arawaté lived in a single village located next to Ipixuna Indian Attraction Post on the middle Ipixuna, an eastern tributary of the Xingu River in the state of Pará. In February 1983 their population numbered 136, while this had grown to 168 by February 1988.

== Culture ==
Unlike their Eastern Amazonian neighbors, the Araweté's primary crop is not manioc but a rapidly maturing maize. Ancestors are very important in their religion.

== Language ==
Araweté people speak the Araweté language, a Tupi-Guaraní language. It is similar to the Asuriní do Tocantins, Parakanã, and Tapirapé languages.

== Bibliography ==
- Viveiros de Castro, Eduardo (1992). From the Enemy's Point of View: Humanity and Divinity in an Amazonian Society. Catherine V. Howard (translator). Chicago and London: The University of Chicago Press.
