= Northern Tupi–Guarani languages =

Language group

Northern Tupi–Guarani
- Tupi–Guarani subgroup VIII
- Geographic distribution: Brazil
- Linguistic classification: Tupian: Tupi–Guarani; Northern Tupi–Guarani
- Subdivisions: Anambé of Ehrenreich †; Emerillon; Guajá; Takunyapé †; Ka'apor; Wayampi; Wayampipukú; Zo'é

Language codes
- ISO 639-3: –
- Glottolog: tupi1281

The Northern Tupi–Guarani languages (also known as Tupi–Guarani VIII) are a subgroup of the Tupi–Guarani language family.

Along with the Timbira and Tenetehara languages, the Northern Tupi–Guarani languages form part of the lower Tocantins-Mearim linguistic area.

== Languages ==
The Northern Tupi–Guarani languages are:

- Anambé of Ehrenreich
- Emerillon
- Guajá
- Wayampi
- Zo'é
- Takunyapé
- Urubú–Kaapor
- Wayampipukú
