= Amanayé =

Indigenous people of Brazil

Total population
- 178 (2014)

Regions with significant populations
- Brazil (Pará)

Languages
- Amanayé (possibly extinct), Portuguese

Religion
- Animism

The Amanayé (Amanayé/Amanaié or Ararandeuara/Araradeua) are a Tupi-Guaranian Indigenous people of Brazil's Amazon basin. They live between the cities of Belém and Brasília in the state of Pará, near the municipality of São Domingos do Capim.

== History and contact ==
Historically, the Amanayé have also been known as the Manaye, Manazewa, Manajo, Manaxo, Ararandeuras, and the Turiwa. They originally came from the Pindaré River area of Maranhão, with possible relations to the Tembé Indians.

It was at the Pindaré River that they resisted integration into villages. The Amanyé were first contacted in 1755 as they tended to avoid white missionaries, however they made a deal with Father David Fay, a Jesuit missionary among the Guajajara of the São Francisco do Carará village. Fay managed to persuade the Amanayé to settle in a village together with the Guajajara, their traditional enemies. Shortly afterwards, part of the group moved to the Alpercatas River, on the border of Maranhão and Piauí, settling near the village of Santo Antônio.

In the early 19th century, their population reached an estimated high of approximately 300 to 400 individuals residing in villages along the Caju River. However, by 1815 just 20 of them remained, mixed with other races, with most disappearing into the Mestizo population in the 20th century, though their contemporary culture provides little disapproval for intermarriage with Mestizos or other Indians. As a result, their population is in rapid decline.

It is believed that in 1873, the Amanayé killed the village missionary, Cândido de Heremence, and a Belgian engineer who happened to be in the area. The retaliations against them led part of the group into hiding near the igarapé Ararandeua, where they avoided contacts with the regional population. According to Nimuendajú, these Amanayé began to identify themselves as Ararandeuara or as Turiwara in order to disguise their identity.

In 1880, the Amanayé allegedly killed a group of Tembé and Turiwara peoples, leading to the president of the Province of Pará to give "weapons and ammunitions so that these tame Indians are able to defend themselves from the attacks by the Amanayé". After this, it is thought that the Amanayé separated themselves completely from the Tembé and the Turiwara, moving to the Capim River.

A group numbering up to 66 remained in 1999, though their numbers increased up to 195 in the year 2001, before decreasing once more to 134 as of 2010, only to increase again by 2014 to 178.

== Lifestyle ==
Along with other Tupi tribes, the Amanayé practice slash-and-burn agriculture, and raise cassava, cotton and tobacco.

The spatial arrangement of the houses of the Amanayé consist of isolated residences, surrounded by their respective roças (planting fields), scattered through the area. The houses are made of "pau-a-pique" (wattle and daub), with or without plaster. The spatial structure of the rooms vary from family to family, but domestic life is always centered in the kitchen, around the wood stove. It is there that the family gathers, while visitors are entertained in the living room. Next to the house is usually the casa de farinha (flour mill), which also can be a place where visitors, and those who are working, can get together. They frequently relocate villages as their soil becomes exhausted, and possibly also to avoid their enemies.

The Amanayé people consist of nuclear families where the women run and take care of the home while the men deal with external matters. The majority of the Amanayé women marry when they are between 15 and 18 years old. It is usually at this age that they first have a child. Nursing lasts for approximately one year, though after the second month the newborn child begins to be fed with carimã (fine manioc meal) and croeira. They frequently relocate villages as their soil becomes exhausted, and possibly also to avoid their enemies.

== Language ==
The Amanayé language belongs to the Tupi–Guarani family, classified by Aryon Rodrigues in the year 1984, together with Anambé and Turiwara languages. Whether or not the Amanayé continue to use their mother tongue is unknown, however the oldest, and some of the youngest, members of the tribe still use some words from their native language in everyday speech and integrate them with Portuguese. In general, they speak Portuguese fluently.

=== Language classification ===
Tupian

- Tupi-Guaraní

- Subgroup VIII

- Amanayé
