= Jacundá language =

Extinct language of Brazil

Jacundá
- Native to: Brazil
- Region: Pará
- Ethnicity: Jacundá people
- Era: attested 1793
- Language family: unclassified

Language codes
- ISO 639-3: None (mis)
- Glottolog: None

Jacundá is an extinct, unclassified language formerly spoken by the Jacundá people. Only two proper names are known from it.

== Name ==
The name "Jacundá" is that of the Crenicichla genus of fish.

== Vocabulary ==
Two Jacundá names among those of chiefs along the Araguaia River recorded in 1793 are recorded from the Jacundá language: Uoriniuera, which the German-Brazilian ethnologist Curt Nimuendajú etymologized as Tupian warinikwéra 'old war', and Claxira, which Nimuendajú claimed was "contrary to Tupí phonetics". He left Jacundá unclassified in his ethnolinguistic map of 1948. Nevertheless, the Czech linguist Čestmír Loukotka (1968) classified it as a Tupian language in his "Pará Group", with the Anambé, Xingu Asurini, Takunyapé, Tapajó, and Parakanã languages.
