= Asurini language =

Asurini may refer to:

- Tocantins Asurini language or Akwáwa language, a Tupi–Guarani dialect cluster of Brazil.
- Xingu Asurini language, a Tupi–Guaraní language of Brazil
