= Karajá language =

Macro-Je language spoken in Brazil

Karajá
- Iny rybè
- Pronunciation: [iˌnə̃ ɾɨˈbɛ]
- Native to: Brazil
- Region: Araguaia River
- Ethnicity: 3,600 Karajá people (2007)
- Native speakers: 2,700 (2006)
- Language family: Macro-Jê: Karajá
- Dialects: Northern; Southern Karajá; Javaé; Xambioá

Language codes
- ISO 639-3: kpj
- Glottolog: kara1500
- ELP: Karajá
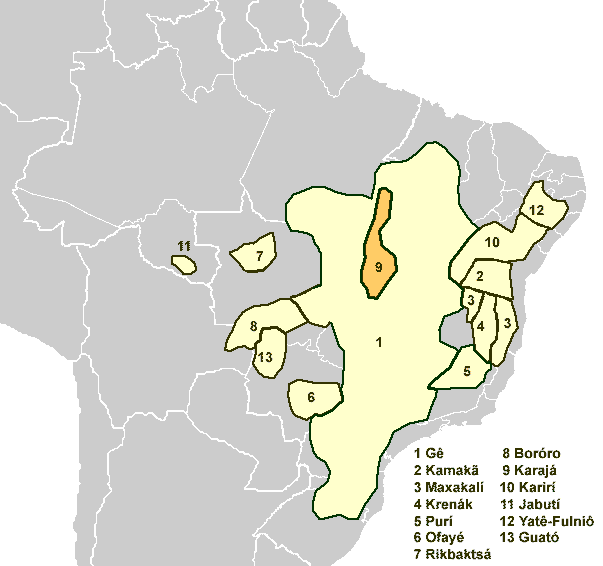

Karajá, also known as Iny rybè, is a Macro-Jê language spoken by the Karajá people in some thirty villages in central Brazil.

There are distinct male and female forms of speech; one of the principal differences is that men drop the sound /k/, which is pronounced by women.

Karaja is a verb-final language, with simple noun and more complex verbal morphology that includes noun incorporation. Verbs inflect for direction as well as person, mood, object, and voice.

== Dialects ==
Dialects are Northern Karajá, Southern Karajá, Xambioá, and Javaé.

=== Karajá proper ===
Karajá proper is spoken on the main course of the Araguaia River in and around Bananal Island. Phonologically, it is set apart from the other dialects (Javaé and Xambioá) by the occurrence of the vowel /ə/ (not represented in the orthography), which corresponds to a full vowel in Javaé and Xambioá whose quality is a copy of the vowel of the next syllable. For example, Karajá bdi /bədɪ/ ‘honey’, -dkỹ /-dəkə̃/ ‘causative suffix’, -tka /-ɗəka/ ‘to tie’, kbò /kəbɔ/ ‘banzeiro’, kdò /kədɔ/ ‘termite’, rkù /ɾəkʊ/ ‘gourd’ correspond to Javaé and Xambioá bidi /bɪdɪ/, -nỹkỹ /-də̃kə̃/, -taka /-ɗaka/, kòbò /kɔbɔ/, kòdò /kɔdɔ/, rùkù /ɾʊkʊ/. Another phonological feature unique to Karajá proper is the progressive palatalization of /k/ and /ɾ/ (to /tʃ/ and /dʒ/) following an /i/: compare Karajá ritxòrè ‘offspring’, itxòrò ‘fox’, ritxoko ‘Ritxoko clay doll’, idjasò ‘arowana’ and Javaé/Xambioá rikòrè, ikòrò, rikoko, iraso. Examples of lexical differences between Karajá proper and other dialects include lei ‘anaconda’, tõsõ ‘woodpecker’, makiti ‘sugarcane’, corresponding to Javaé and Xambioá rei, sõsõ, biditi.

Karajá proper is further subdivided into Northern and Southern Karajá. Southern Karajá is spoken in the Fontoura (Btõiry) village and further to the south, whereas Northern Karajá is spoken in the São Domingos (Krèhãwa) village and further to the north. There are few differences between Northern and Southern Karajá. Examples of lexical differences include N(orthern) ji(k)arỹ / S(outhern) di(k)arỹ ‘I’, N wi / S wiu ‘song.♂’, N adèrana / S wdèna ‘prostitute’, N bdòlèkè / S bdòkùjkè ‘pirarucu fish’, N butxi / S boti ‘clay pot’, N (k)õritxi / S (k)uritxi ‘curassow’, and other word pairs. Northern Karajá also differs from Southern Karajá in using different habitual markers for different persons (first person -wahã, second person -mahã, third person -mỹhỹ), whereas Southern Karajá uses -mỹhỹ for all three persons. In addition, there is a difference regarding the occurrence of the centripetal prefix (n- or d-, phonologically /d-/) in the first person of the realis mood. In Northern Karajá (just like in Javaé and Xambioá), it occurs only once, after the first person prefix: ãdiwyde ‘I brought it’. In Southern Karajá, it occurs twice, both before and after the person prefix: nadiwyde ‘I brought it’.

=== Javaé ===
Javaé is currently spoken by the Javaés River, a smaller branch of the Araguaia, though historically the Javaé inhabited the interior of the Bananal island, until at least the first half of the 20th century. The Javaé are referred to by the Karajá proper as ixỹju, a term otherwise used to non-Karajá indigenous peoples such as the Xavante, but clearly speak a variety of Karajá. Javaé has more Apyãwa loans than other Karajá dialects. Phonologically, Javaé is characterized by the occurrence of /e/ corresponding to Karajá /ə/ and Xambioá /i/ preceding a syllable which contains a /i/: Javaé -tebiè ‘to raise, to feed’, hetxi ‘bottom, buttocks’, exi ‘soft’, -teji ‘to put’ correspond to Karajá -tbiè, htxi, àxi, tdi; Xambioá -txibiè, hitxi, ixi, tidi. In addition, Javaé has less genderlectal differences than Karajá and Xambioá, as in many cases the Javaé women systematically use forms that are restricted to the male genderlect in other dialects.

=== Xambioá ===
Xambioá is spoken on the east bank of the Araguaia, close to the mouth of the Maria River (a western tributary of the Araguaia), which makes it the northernmost variety of Karajá. Ribeiro (2012) reports that there were only 8 fluent speakers in 1998, all of them elderly. Phonologically, Xambioá is characterized by the progressive palatalization of /k/ to [c] following an /i/, as in ikòrò [icɔˈɾɔ] ‘fox’ (unlike in Karajá, this does not lead to a neutralization with [tʃ]). Another phonological feature of Xambioá is the occurrence of the oral allophone of /a/ (i.e., [a]) where other dialects have [ã]: Xambioá habu ‘man’, ati ‘Pimelodus|mandi fish’, aw(òk)ò ‘canoe’ vs. Karajá hãbu, hãti, hãw(k)ò. Some Xambioá words are not found in other dialects, such as the Língua Geral Amazônica borrowing mabèra ‘paper’ (in Karajá and Javaé, the term for ‘skin, bark, cloth’ is used instead: Karajá ♀ tky, Javaé ♀ tyky, Karajá/Javaé ♂ tyy).

== Phonology ==
=== Vowels ===
Karajá has ten oral vowels, /i ɪ e ɛ ə a u ʊ o ɔ/, and three nasal vowels, /ĩ ə̃ õ/. The Javaé and Xambioá dialects differ from Karajá in lacking /ə/. /a/ is nasalized word initially and when preceded by /h/ or a voiced stop (except in Xambioá): /aθɪ/ → [ãθɪ] 'grass', /ɔha/ → [ɔhã] 'armadillo'. /a/ also triggers the occurrence of the nasal allophones of preceding /b/ or /d/: /bahadʊ/ → [mahãdʊ] 'group', /dadɪ/ → [nadɪ] 'my mother'.

	Front	Central	Back
Close	i, ĩ		u
Near-close	ɪ		ʊ
Close-mid	e	ə, ə̃	o, õ
Open-mid	ɛ		ɔ
Open		a ~ ã	

	Front		Back	
	-ATR	+ATR	-ATR	+ATR
Close	ɪ	i	ʊ	u
Mid	ɛ	e	ɔ	o

This language has ATR vowel harmony which causes the non-ATR vowels /ɪ ɛ ʊ ɔ/ to become more tense (/i e u o/) by the influence of a ATR vowel (one of /i e u o ĩ/) located further to the right. The vowels /a ə̃ õ/ are opaque and /ə/ is transparent to harmony. Note that /ɛ ɔ/ undergo the harmony in an iterative manner (as in /ɾ-ɛ-ɾɔ=ɾ-e/ → /ɾeɾoɾe/ ‘I ate it’), whether /ɪ ɨ ʊ/ may optionally block the further spread of the [+ATR] feature: /ɾ-ɛ-hɪ=ɾ-e/ → /ɾ'''e'''h'''i'''ɾe/ or /ɾɛhiɾe/ ‘I drove it away’.

V → [+ATR] / _ (C)-V_{[+ATR]}

=== Consonants ===
The chart below contains the consonant phones observed in Karajá.

		Labial	Dental	Post- alveolar	Velar	Glottal
Nasal		m	n			
Plosive/ Affricate	voiceless			tʃ	k	
Plosive/ Affricate	voiced	b	d	dʒ		
Implosive			ɗ			
Fricative			θ	ʃ		h
Liquid	median	w	ɾ			
Liquid	lateral		l			

- /b d/ have nasal allophones [m n] when occurring before /a/.
- /d l ɗ θ/ are palatalized to [dʒ dʒ tʃ ʃ] when adjacent to [+ATR] close vowels.
- In the Karajá proper dialect only, /k ɾ/ are progressively palatalized to [tʃ dʒ] following /i/.

In fact, almost all occurrences of [dʒ tʃ ʃ] can be explained by the operation of these two processes; for these reasons, Ribeiro (2012) argues that [dʒ tʃ ʃ] have no phonemic status. Under this analysis, Karajá has only twelve consonant phonemes, eight of which are coronal.

The chart below illustrates the phonemic inventory of Karajá assuming [m n dʒ tʃ ʃ] are not phonemic.

		Coronal	Peripheral	
		dental	front	back
Obstruent	plosive	d	b	k
Obstruent	implosive	ɗ		
Obstruent	fricative	θ		h
Sonorant	median	ɾ	w	
Sonorant	lateral	l		

== Men's and women's speech ==
Some examples of the differences between men's and women's speech, especially the presence or lack of /k/ (including in borrowings from Portuguese), follow. Note that men maintain /k/ in at least one grammatical ending.

Women	Men	Gloss
kotù /kɔɗʊ/	òtù /ɔɗu/	turtle
kòlùkò /kɔlʊkɔ/	òlùò /ɔluɔ/	labret
karitxakre /kaɾitʃa-kɾe/	ariakre /aɾia-kɾe/	I will walk*
bèraku /bɛɾaku/	bero /beɾo/	river
anona /adõda/	aõna /aõda/	thinɡ
kabè /kabɛ/	abè /abɛ/	coffee (from Portuguese café)

* The /itʃa/ derives historically from *ika, and so becomes /ia/ in men's speech.

The first (Northern Karajá, Javaé, Xambioá: ♀ jikarỹ, ♂ jiarỹ /di(k)aɾə̃/; Southern Karajá: ♀ dikarỹ, ♂ diarỹ /dɪ(k)aɾə̃/) and third (tki /ɗəkɪ/, ♂ optional male form: tii /ɗɪɪ/) person pronouns differ based on gender of the speaker, but the second person pronoun kai /kai/ is an exception to this rule, and is pronounced the same by men and women.

It is hypothesized (Ribeiro 2012) that in the past this process of the k-drop became a sign of masculinity and women resisted it in order to keep a more conservative form of speech.

== Morphology ==
=== Verb ===
The verb in Karajá grammar always agrees with the subject of the sentence, as it does in French for example; these agreements are determined by the past and present tense (also known as realis) or future, potential, and admonitory tenses (also known as irrealis). Verbs have no lexical opposites (such as in vs. out) and direction is represented through inflection; all Karajá verbs can inflect for direction. Verbs are either transitive or intransitive and the valence of each verb, therefore, may increase or decrease depending on their status as transitive or intransitive.

=== Noun ===
Nouns can be incorporated into verbs to create noun-verb compounds with the noun being placed into the verb. Any noun can be turned into a verb with the use of a suffix and action nouns can be created with the use of the verb stem.

=== Pronoun ===
There are three personal pronouns:

- First person (‘I’): ♀ jikarỹ /dikaɾə̃, ♂ jiarỹ /diaɾə̃/ (Southern Karajá: ♀ dikarỹ /dɪkaɾə̃/, ♂ diarỹ /dɪaɾə̃/)

Diarỹ aõkõ, kaita.
/dɪaɾə̃ aõkõ, kai=ɗa/
I NEG you=ASSERT
‘Not me, but you instead.’

- Second person (‘you’): kai /kai/

Diarỹ aõkõ, kaita.
/dɪaɾə̃ aõkõ, kai=ɗa/
I NEG you=ASSERT
‘Not me, but you instead.’

- Third person (‘he/she/it’): tki /ɗəkɪ/ (♂ optional male form: tii /ɗɪɪ/)

Tki ohã riròkõre.
/ɗəkɪ ɔhã ∅-ɾ-ɪ-ɾɔ=kõ=ɾ-e/
he armadillo 3-CTFG-TRANS-eat=NEG=CTFG-IMPERF
‘He doesn’t eat armadillo.’

- These pronouns can be pluralized with the use of the pluralizer boho. When pluralized, the first person plural has both an inclusive and exclusive interpretation as in the following examples:

Diarỹ boho kdùra ãriròrènykre.
/dɪaɾə̃ boho kədʊɾa a-ɾ-ɪ-ɾɔ=ɾɛdə̃=kɾe/
I PL fish 1-CTFG-TRANS-eat=CTFG-PL=FUT
‘We (exclusive) will eat fish.’

Iny boho {kdùra rkiròrènykre.}
/idə̃ boho {kədʊɾa ɾək-ɪ-ɾɔ=ɾ-ɛdə̃=kɾe/}
{Karajá PL} fish 1PL.INCL-TRANS-eat=POT
‘We (inclusive) will eat fish.’

Possessive pronouns are not used but are instead marked by affixes (ie. wa- = ‘my’) and there are three demonstrative pronouns:

- ka - ‘this’
- kia - ‘that (close to the addressee)’
- kùa - ‘that (distant from both the speaker and the addressee)’

=== Direction ===
Direction in the Karajá language does not have any lexical opposites, such as in and out or go and come. Direction, rather, is marked by a set of prefixes that determine whether the event in the sentence is happening away from or toward the speaker. Centrifugal direction (away from the speaker) is characterized by means of the prefix r- while centripetal direction (toward the speaker) is characterized by means of the prefix d-. All the verbs in the Karajá language — even those that do not convey the semantics of movement — obligatorily inflect for direction.

- Centrifugal:

Rurure.
/∅-ɾ-∅-ʊɾʊ=ɾ-e/
3-CTFG-INTR-die=CTFG-IMP
‘He died (thither).’

- Centripetal:

Durude.
/∅-d-∅-ʊɾʊ=d-e/
3-CTPT-INTR-die=CTPT-IMP
‘He died (hither).’

== Syntax ==
=== Valence ===
Karajá language is characterized both by the reduction of valence and by the increase in valence. Valence increase happens through causitivization and through oblique promotion while valence decrease happens through reflixivatization, passivization, and antipassivization (Ribeiro 2012).

==== Valence increase ====
Unergative verbs may be causativized by means of suffixing the causativizer suffix -dkỹ plus the verbalizer suffix -ny to the nominalized verb. In the example below, the verb rika ‘to walk’ is first nominalized by means of the process of consonantal replacement, yielding rira, and then causativized.

Hãbu kùladù ririradkỹnyrèri.
/habu kʊladʊ ∅-ɾ-ɪ-ɾi[ɾ]a-dəkə̃-də̃=ɾ-ɛɾɪ/
man child 3-CTFG-walk[NMLZ]-CAUS-VERB=CTFG-PROGR
‘The man is making the child walk.’

The man in this example is the causer who makes the child, the causee, walk.

==== Valence-decreasing morphology ====
In Karajá, it is possible to demote a patient of a transitive verb to peripheral status by means of the antipassive prefix ò-:

Nadi ròsùhòrèri.
/d-ādɪ ∅-ɾ-ɔ-θʊhɔ=ɾɛɾɪ/
REL-mother 3-CTFG-ANTI-wash=CTFG-PROGR
‘My mother is washing (something).’

Reflexivity in the Karajá language is marked by the reflexive prefix with two allomorphs, exi- ̣(on verbs) and ixi- (on postpositions):

Dikarỹ karexisuhokre.
/dɪkaɾə̄ ka-ɾ-eθi-θʊhɔ=kəɾe/
I 1-CTFG-REFL-wash=FUT
‘I will wash myself.’

Hãbu iximy robire.
/habu iθi=bə̄ ∅-ɾ-∅-obi=ɾ-e/
Man REFL=LOC 3-CTFG-INTR-see=CTFG-IMPERF
‘The man saw himself.’

In these examples, the patient is coreferential with the agent (that is, they refer to the same individual).

===== Passivization =====
Passives are described as the change of a clause from a transitive to an intransitive sentence through the demotion of the subject. Passive verbs are marked either by the prefix a- (or by its zero allomorph ∅- in the vowel-initial stems that belong to the so called ɗ-class):

Nadi watky risùhòrèri.
/d-ãdɪ wa-ɗəkɨ ∅-ɾ-ɪ-θʊhɔ=ɾ-ɛɾɪ/
REL-mother 1-clothes 3-CTFG-TRANS-wash=CTFG-PROGR
‘My mother is washing my clothes.’

Watky rasùhòrèri.
/wa-ɗəkɨ ∅-ɾ-a-θʊhɔ=ɾ-ɛɾɪ/
1-clothes 3-CTFG-PASS-wash=CTFG-PROGR
‘My clothes are being washed.’

Here, the subject ‘mother’ is demoted in the second example.

== Number ==
When referring to nouns, plurality is expressed through three processes: reduplication, the pluralizer -boho, and the use of the noun mahãdù ‘people, group’. In verbs, plurality is marked through the use of the pluralizer -eny.

=== Reduplication ===
In the Karajá language, reduplication occurs with nouns and is used to convey plurality:

iròdu iròdu
/irɔdʊ irɔdʊ/
animal animal
‘animals’

=== Pluralizer -boho ===
The pluralizer -boho is used to pluralize the three personal pronouns:

Diarỹ boho kdùra ãriròrènykre.
/dɪaɾə̃ boho kədʊɾa a-ɾ-ɪ-ɾɔ=ɾɛdə̃=kɾe/
I PL fish 1-CTFG-TRANS-eat=CTFG-PL=FUT
‘We (exclusive) will eat fish.’

Iny boho kdùra rkiròrènykre.
/idə̃ boho kədʊɾa ɾək-ɪ-ɾɔ=ɾ-ɛdə̃=kɾe/
Karajá PL fish 1PL.INCL-TRANS-eat=POT
‘We (inclusive) will eat fish.’

In addition, the latter example shows how the pluralizer –boho, when combined with the noun for people (iny), functions as a first person plural inclusive pronoun to include those outside of a specific group. According to Ribeiro, iny serves the same function as the phrase a gente, commonly found in Brazilian Portuguese.

=== mahãdù ===
In contrast to the pluralizer -boho, the noun word mahãdù is not used with pronouns but rather functions as a noun to pluralize a group of people, as shown in the following example:

Iny mahãdù tamy ròrùnyre.
/idə̄ bãhãdʊ ɗabə̃ ∅-r-a-ɔrʊ-də̃=r-e/
people group 3.AL 3-CTFG-INTR-run-VERB=CTFG-IMPRF
‘Firing their guns, the Karajá ran after them, it is said.’

In the above sentence, ‘Karajá’ (iny) becomes pluralized through the use of bãhãdʊ.

=== Pluralizer -èny ===
As mentioned above, the pluralizer -èny functions to pluralize verbs as shown in the following example:

Tamyle dòidènyde tuijyymy.
/ɗabə̄=le ∅-d-∅-ɔɪ=d-ɛdə̄=d-e ɗʊ=idʒɨɨ=bə̄/
3.AL=EMPH 3-CTPT-move(PL)=CTPT-PLURAL=CTPT-IMP 3.LOC=story=LOC
‘They came to him to tell the story.’

‘Came’, in this example, is pluralized to indicate that many individuals came.

== Vocabulary ==
=== Language contact ===
Ribeiro (2012) finds a number of Apyãwa loanwords in Karajá (such as bèhyra ‘carrying basket’, kòmỹdawyra andu ’beans’, hãrara ‘macaw (sp.)’, tarawè ‘parakeet (sp.)’, txakohi ‘Txakohi ceremonial mask’, hyty ‘garbage (Javaé dialect)’) as well as several Karajá loans in Apyãwa (tãtã ‘banana’, tori ‘White man’, marara ‘turtle stew’, irãwore ‘Irabure ceremonial mask’), Parakanã, and Asuriní of Trocará (sata ‘banana’, toria ‘White man’). Some loans from one of the Língua Geral varieties (Língua Geral Paulista or Língua Geral Amazônica) have also been found, including jykyra ‘salt’, mỹkawa ‘firearm’, brùrè ‘hoe’, kòmỹta ‘beans’, mabèra ‘paper (Xambioá dialect)’, ĩtajuwa ‘money (dated)’).

Karajá has also contacted with the distantly related Mẽbêngôkre language. Ribeiro (2012) identifies a number of Karajá loanwords in Mẽbêngôkre, especially in the dialect spoken by the Xikrin group; the source of these loanwords is thought to be the Xambioá dialect. Examples include warikoko (Kayapó dialect) or watkoko (Xikrin dialect) ‘tobacco pipe’, rara ‘kind of basket’, wiwi ‘song, chant’, bikwa ‘relative, friend’, bero ‘puba flour’, borrowed from Karajá werikòkò, lala, wii, bikòwa, bèrò.

Loanwords from Brazilian Portuguese, such as nieru ‘money’ and maritò ‘suit, jacket’ (from dinheiro, paletó), are also found.

Jolkesky (2016) notes that there are lexical similarities with the Karib, Puinave-Nadahup, and Tupi language families due to contact.
