= Emerillon =

Emerillon may refer to:

- Emerillon people, an Indigenous people of French Guiana
- Emerillon language, a Tupian language of French Guiana
- Émérillon, a ship used by Jacques Cartier
- Emerillon (software), an OpenStreetMap viewer
