= Ava language =

Ava may be,

- Ava Guarani language
- Avá-Canoeiro language
