= Tupi–Guarani languages =

Subfamily of the Tupian languages, indigenous to South America

Tupi–Guarani
- Geographic distribution: Argentina, Brazil, Bolivia, French Guiana, Paraguay, Peru
- Linguistic classification: Tupian: Tupi–Guarani
- Subdivisions: Guarani; Guarayu; Tupi; Teneteharan; Kawahib; Kamayurá; Xingu; Northern

Language codes
- Glottolog: tupi1276
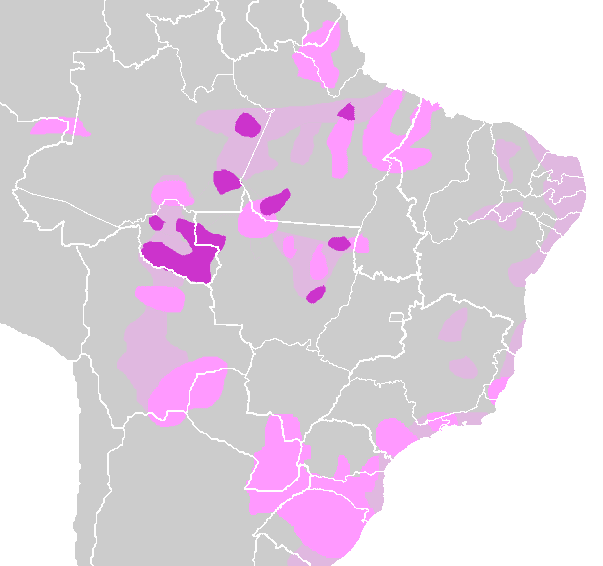
- Tupi–Guarani (medium pink), other Tupian (violet), and probable range c. 1500 (pink-grey)

Tupi–Guarani (/tuːˈpiː ɡwɑːˈrɑːni/; Tupi-Guarani: [tuˈpi ɡwaɾaˈni];) is the most widely distributed subfamily of the Tupian languages of South America. It consists of about fifty languages, including Guarani and Old Tupi. The most widely spoken in modern times by far is Guarani, which is one of the two official languages of Paraguay.

== Classification ==
=== Rodrigues & Cabral (2012) ===
Rodrigues & Cabral (2012) propose eight branches of Tupí–Guaraní:

- Tupí–Guaraní
  - Guaraní (Group I)
  - Guarayu (Group II): Guarayu, Pauserna**, Sirionó (dialects: Yuqui, Jorá**)
  - Tupí (Group III): Old Tupi (lingua franca dialect: Tupí Austral), Tupinambá (dialects: Nheengatu, a.k.a. Língua Geral as lingua franca, Cocama–Omagua*
  - Tenetehara (Group IV): Akwáwa (dialects: Asuriní, Suruí do Pará, Parakanã), Avá-Canoeiro, Tapirapé, Tenetehára (dialects: Guajajara, Tembé), Turiwára
  - Kawahíb (Group VI): Apiacá, Kawahíb (numerous varieties; e.g. Piripkúra, Diahói), Kayabí, Karipúna, ?Uru-Pa-In
  - Kamayurá (Group VII)
  - Xingu (Group VIIIa): Anambé (of Cairarí), Amanayé, Xingú Asuriní, Araweté, Aurá, Ararandewara
  - Northern Tupi–Guaraní (Group VIIIb): Anambé of Ehrenreich, Emerillon, Guajá, Wayampi, Zo'é, Takunyapé, Urubú–Kaapor, Wayampipukú

*Cabral argues that Kokama/Omagua is a mixed language, and so not directly classifiable, though most of its basic vocabulary is Tupi–Guarani.

**Not listed in Rodrigues & Cabral (2012)

Sound changes from Proto-Tupi-Guarani (PTG) defining each of the eight Tupi-Guarani groups as listed by Rodrigues & Cabral (2002):

Group	PTG final consonants	PTG *tʃ	PTG *pw	PTG *pj	PTG *j
1	lost	*tʃ > tʃ, ts, s; *ts > h, zero	*pw > kw, k	*pj > tʃ, ʃ	
2	lost	*tʃ, *ts merged as ts, s	*pw > kw, k	*pj preserved	
3	preserved	*tʃ, *ts merged as ts, s	*pw preserved	*pj preserved	
4	preserved (with some modifications)	*tʃ, *ts merged as h	*pw > kw	*pj > tʃ, ts	*j > tʃ, ts, s, z
5	preserved	*tʃ, *ts merged as h, zero	*pw > ɸ	*pj > s	*j > dʒ
6	preserved	*tʃ, *ts merged as h	*pw > kw (Parintintín, Apiaká); *pw > ɣw, ɣ (Tupí-Kawahíb)	*pj preserved	*j preserved
7	preserved	*tʃ, *ts merged as h, zero	*pw > hw, h	*pj > ts	*j preserved
8	partially lost	*tʃ, *ts merged as h, zero	*pw > kw	*pj > s	*j preserved

=== Michael, et al. (2015) ===
Michael, et al. (2015) propose the following classification for the Tupi–Guarani languages.

- Tupí-Guaraní
  - Kamaiurá (600 speakers)
  - Nuclear Tupí-Guaraní
    - Northern
      - Guajá (280 speakers)
      - Ka'ápor (800 speakers)
      - Avá-Canoeiro (14 speakers)
    - Central
        - Anambé, Araweté (Anambé 6 speakers, Araweté 280 speakers)
        - Xingú Asurini (120 speakers)
        - Tocantins Asuriní, Parakanã (700–1,500 speakers)
        - Tapirapé (560 speakers)
    - Peripheral
      - Wayampi, Emerillon (Wayampi 1,200 speakers, Emerillon 400 speakers)
      - Kayabí, Parintintin (Kayabí 1,000 speakers, Kagwahiva 870 speakers)
      - Diasporic
        - Tembé (13,000 speakers)
          - Tupi
            - Omagua, Kokama (Omagua 10 speakers, Cocama 250 speakers)
            - Tupinambá (Nheengatu 19,000 speakers)
          - Southern
            - Sirionó, Yuki (500 speakers)
            - Guarayu, Pauserna † (Guarayu 5,900 speakers)
            - Guaranian
              - Aché (910 speakers)
              - Mbyá
              - Paraguay Guaraní (4.85 million speakers)
                - Xetá †, Kaiowá, Ñandeva (Kaiwá 18,000 speakers, Ava Guarani 16,000 speakers)
                - Tapiete, Chiriguano (Chiriguano 51,000 speakers)

O'Hagan et al. (2014, 2019) proposes that Proto-Tupi-Guarani was spoken in the region of the lower Tocantins and Xingu Rivers, just to the south of Marajó Island in eastern Pará State, Brazil. Proto-Omagua-Kokama then expanded up the Amazon River, Proto-Tupinambá expanded south along the Atlantic coast, and the Southern branch expanded up along the Tocantins/Araguaia River towards the Paraná River basin.

=== Jolkesky (2016) ===
Below is an internal classification of Tupi-Guarani by Jolkesky (2016), which is largely based on Michael, et al. (2015):

(† = extinct)

- Tupí-Guaraní
  - Kamayura: Kamayura
  - Kaapor-Ava
    - Ava-Canoeiro: Ava-Canoeiro
    - Kaapor: Anambe †; Aura; Guaja; Takuñape †; Urubu-Kaapor
  - Akwawa-Arawete
    - Akwawa-Tapirape
      - Akwawa: Asurini do Tocantins; Parakanã; Surui (Tupi-Guarani)
      - Tapirape: Tapirape
    - Arawete-Asurini
      - Arawete: Amanaye †; Anambe; Ararandewara †; Arawete
      - Asurini do Xingu: Asurini do Xingu
  - Nuclear Tupi-Guarani
    - Tenetehara: Guajajara; Tembe; Turiwara †
    - Kawahib-Kayabi
      - Apiaka: Apiaka
      - Juma: Juma
      - Kayabi: Kayabi
      - Kawahib: Amondawa; Karipuna (Tupi); Parintintin; Piripkura; Tukumanfed †; Uruewauwau; Wirafed
    - Diasporic Tupi-Guarani
      - Guarani-Guarayu-Siriono
        - Guarayu: Guarayu; Pauserna
        - Siriono: Siriono; Jora †; Yuki
        - Guarani
          - Ache: Ache
          - Guarani: Guarani, Classical †; Chiriguano; Chiripa
          - Central: Guarani Paraguaio
          - Western: Guarani Boliviano; Tapiete
          - Eastern: Kayowa; Mbya; Ñandeva; Pai Tavytera; Sheta
      - Tupinamba-Kokama
        - Kokama-Omagua: Kokama; Kokamilla; Omagua
        - Tupi: Tupi †; Tupi Austral †
        - Tupinamba: Nhengatu; Tupinamba †
        - Wayampi: Emerillon; Wayampi; Zo'e

=== Ferraz and Reichert (2021) ===
The following is an approximation of the results of a computational phylogenetic study of the Tupí-Guaraní languages by Ferraz and Reichert (2021).

- Tupí-Guaraní
  - Guajá–Tenetehara
    - Guajá; Tembé, Guajajara
  - Guaraní
    - Warazu
    - Xetá
    - Guayaki; Tapiete, Chiriguano
    - Guaraní; Kaiowá, Mbyá
    - Guarayo; Sirionó, Yuki
  - Tupi
    - Tupinambá; Nheengatu, Ka'apor (Urubu-Kaapor)
  - Northern
    - Kamayura; Anambé, Araweté
    - Avá–Wayampí?
      - Avá-Canoeiro
      - Wayampí Jarí; Emerillon, Wayampí
  - Central
    - Asurini Xingu
    - Akwawa–Tapirapé
      - Apiaká; Suruí; Tapirapé; Parakanã, Asurini
    - Kawahib
      - Kayabi
      - Parintintin, Tenharim
      - Amondava, Urueuwauwau

=== Loukotka (1968) ===
Below is a list of Tupi–Guarani language varieties listed by Loukotka (1968), including names of unattested varieties.

Tupi–Guarani language varieties listed by Loukotka (1968)

Tupi (Abañeénga) dialects

- Tamoyo – once spoken from the Cabo de São Tomé to Angra dos Reis, state of Rio de Janeiro. (Unattested.)
- Ararape – once spoken on the Paraíba do Sul River in the state of Rio de Janeiro. (Unattested.)
- Temimino – once spoken on the coast of the state of Espirito Santo. (Unattested.)
- Tupiniquin / Margaya – once spoken on the coast from Espirito Santo as far as Camamu, state of Bahia.
- Tupinamba – formerly spoken on the coast from Camamu as far as the mouth of the São Francisco River, later on the coast in the state of Maranhão.
- Tupina – once spoken in the interior of the state of Bahia. (Unattested.)
- Caeté / Caité – once spoken on the coast from the mouth of the São Francisco River to the mouth of the Paraíba do Norte River. (Unattested.)
- Amoipira / Anaupira – once spoken in the interior of the state of Bahia, from Cabrobó to the mouth of the Grande River. (Unattested.)
- Abaete – once spoken in Bahia on the Abaeté River. (Unattested.)
- Maromomi – dialect spoken at the old mission of São Barnabé, Rio de Janeiro. (Unattested.)
- Potiguara / Petigare – dialect once spoken on the coast from the mouth of the Paraíba do Norte River to the mouth of the Parnaiba River, now spoken by a few families in the Baía da Traição, state of Paraíba.
- Viatan – once spoken in the interior of the states of Pernambuco, but the exact location not recorded. (Unattested.)
- Tobajara / Miarigois – once spoken in the interior of the state of Ceará on the Camocim River. (Unattested.)
- Cahicahi / Caicaze / Caicai – once spoken on the lower course of the Itapecurú River, state of Maranhão. (Unattested.)
- Jaguaribára – once spoken at the mouth of the Jaguaribare River, state of Ceará. (Unattested.)
- Tupinambarana – once spoken on the island of the same name on the Amazon River. (Unattested.)
- Nhengahiba / Ingahiva – once spoken in the southern part of Marajó Island, Pará. (Unattested.)
- Nheéngatu / Niangatú / Lingua Geral – a language spoken by the mixed population on both banks of the Amazon River and in the past century used in intertribal and commercial relations.

Guarani (Karani, Abañéem) dialects

- Chandri / Yarri – once spoken on the Martín García Island and in the Martín Chico region, Argentina, and on the coast near San Lázaro, Paraguay. (Unattested.)
- Topare – once spoken near San Gabriel, Uruguay. (Unattested.)
- Cariú / Carijó – once spoken in the state of Rio Grande do Sul, Brazil, from Porto Alegre to Antonina, state of Paraná and in the Serra do Mar.
- Arachane / Arechane – once spoken around the Lagoa dos Patos, Rio Grande do Sul. (Unattested.)
- Itatin – originally spoken south of the Apa River, Paraguay, now by a few families on the Brilhante River, state of Mato Grosso, Brazil. (Unattested.)
- Bituruna – once spoken on the São Antonio River, Peixe River, and Chopim River in the state of Paraná, Brazil. (Unattested.)
- Tape – extinct dialect from the Serra Geral, state of Rio Grande do Sul (Unattested.)
- Apapocúva – originally spoken on the Dourados River and Amambaí River, state of Mato Grosso, later on the Itaparé River, state of São Paulo, now extinct.
- Tañyguá – originally spoken on the Dourados River, Mato Grosso, later on the Aguapeí River, state of São Paulo, now extinct. (Unattested.)
- Oguaíva – originally spoken in Mato Grosso, later on the Paranapanema River, state of São Paulo. (Unattested.)
- Kainguá / Painguá / Montese – language affined to Guaraní, spoken on the Jejuy River, Paraguay, and on the Aracaí River and Igatimí River, state of Paraná. Dialects are:
  - Baticola – once spoken in the Serra Amambaí, state of Mato Grosso. (Unattested.)
  - Paiguasú – spoken on the Curupaiña River, Mato Grosso. (Unattested.)
  - Avahuguai – spoken on the Dourados River, Mato Grosso. (Unattested.)
  - Yvytyiguá – spoken in the Serra do Diabo, Mato Grosso. (Unattested.)
  - Apiteré – spoken between the São Joaquim River and Amambaí River, Mato Grosso. (Unattested.)
  - Tembecua – spoken by the neighbors of the Ivitiigúa (Yvytyigua) tribe.
  - Chiripá – spoken on the Acaray River, Paraguay; and at the mouth of the Iguasú River, Argentina.
  - Mbyhá / Jeguaká Tenondé / Bwihá / Caiua / Cahygua – spoken on the Monday River, Paraguay.
- Canoiero / Aba / Tiäbezä – spoken on both banks of the Tocantins River, in the central part of Bananal Island and at the mouth of the Crixás River and Peixe River, state of Goiás.

Guaranized languages

- Shetá / Aré / Yvaparé – once spoken in the interior of the state of Paraná on the Ivaí River, now extinct.
- Serra dos Dourados (tribe with unknown name) – in the Serra dos Dourados, state of Paraná.
- Guayaquí / Acé – spoken by a tribe in the Cordillera de Villa Rica, Paraguay.
- Notobotocudo / Pihtadyouai – language of an extinct tribe that lived at the sources of the Uruguai River and Iguasú River, state of Santa Catarina.

Kamayurá group

- Kamayurá / Camayura – spoken by a small tribe on the Ferro River in the Xingú basin, state of Mato Grosso.
- Awití / Auetö / Aweti – spoken in the same region on the Culiseú River, Mato Grosso.
- Arawiné – little known language from the 7 de setembro River, state of Mato Grosso.

Tapirapé group

- Tapirapé – spoken on the Tapirapé River and Naja River, Mato Grosso.
- Ampaneá – extinct language once spoken at the sources of the Tapirapé River, state of Mato Grosso. (Unattested.)

Northern group

- Tenetehara – language with two dialects:
  - Guajajára – originally spoken at the sources of the Itapecurú River and Mearim River, now on the Grajaú River and Pindaré River, state of Maranhão.
  - Tembé – originally spoken on the upper course of the Pindaré River, now on the Capiro River and Acará Pequeno River, state of Maranhão.
- Guajá / Guaxara / Wazaizara / Ayaya – spoken between the Capim River and the lower course of the Gurupí River, Maranhão.
- Manajé / Ararandeuára – spoken at the sources of the Bujarú River and on the Mojú River and Ararandéua River, state of Maranhão.
- Manoxo / Amanaye – extinct language once spoken on the lower course of the Mearim River near São Bento, Maranhão. (Unattested.)
- Turiwára / Turiguara – spoken originally on the Turi River, now on the Acará Grande River.
- Kaapor / Urubú / Gavião – spoken by the tribe of beautiful feather workers who lived on the Gurupi River, Guama River, and Turiassú River, Maranhão.
- Pocheti – once spoken on the Araguaia River and Mojú River. (Unattested.)

Pará group

- Camboca – extinct language once spoken between the mouths of the Tocantins River and Jacundá River. (Unattested.)
- Apehou – once spoken at the mouth of the Xingú River. (Unattested.)
- Aratú – once spoken at the mouth of the Curuá River. (Unattested.)
- Mapua – once spoken on Marajó Island on the Mapuá River. (Unattested.)
- Anajá – once spoken on Marajó Island on the Anajás River. (Unattested.)
- Camarapim – once spoken at the mouth of the Pacajá River. (Unattested.)
- Uanapú – once spoken on the Anapú River. (Unattested.)
- Coaní – once spoken at the mouth of the Xingú River. (Unattested.)
- Mamayaná – once spoken to the south of the mouth of the Anapú River. (Unattested.)
- Pacajá – once spoken between the Pacajá River and Anapú River.
- Jacunda – once spoken on the Jacundá River. (Villa Real 1848, p. 432, only two words.)
- Parakanã – spoken between the Tocantins River and Pacajá River by an almost unknown tribe.
- Anambé – once spoken on the left bank of the Tocantins River near Rebojo de Guariba, now extinct.
- Caranbú – spoken by the unknown neighbors of the Anambé tribe. (Unattested.)
- Tapirauha / Cupelobo / Kupẽ-rob / Jandiaí – spoken by only a few individuals on the Igarapé do Bacurí and west of the Cachoeira de Itaboca.
- Anta – once spoken by the neighbors of the Tapirauha tribe. (Unattested.)
- Tacayuna – once spoken on the Tacaiuna River. (Unattested.)
- Asurini – spoken by the totally unknown tribe that lived between the upper course of the Xingú River, and the Freso River and Pacajá River. (Unattested.)
- Mudzyetíre – a Cayapó name for an unknown Tupi tribe that lived on the Igarapé Sororosinho. (Unattested.)
- Tacuñapé / Eidum / Péua – extinct language once spoken on the Iriri River and Novo River. (only a few words.)
- Tacumandícai / Caras Pretas – language of a very little known tribe that lived on the lower course of the Xingú River.
- Jauari – extinct language once spoken on the Vermelho River and Araguaia River. (Unattested.)
- Zapucaya – once spoken between the Amazon and Paraná do Urariá Rivers. (Unattested.)
- Tapajó – once spoken at the mouth of the Tapajós River (cf. Amazonas group). (Unattested.)
- Auacachi – once spoken at the mouth of the Auacachi River. (Unattested.)
- Papateruana – once spoken in a part of Tupinambarana Island on the Amazon River. (Unattested.)

Guiana group

- Oyampi / Wayapí / Guayapi – originally spoken on the lower course of the Xingú River, later on the Oiapoque River in the territory of Amapá, in French Guiana, now on the Maroni River.
- Tamacom – extinct language once spoken on the middle course of the Jarí River and at the sources of the Maracá River, Pará. (Unattested.)
- Cusari / Coussani – once spoken on the upper course of the Araguarí River, territory of Amapá. (Unattested.)
- Paikipiranga / Parixi – spoken at the sources of the Maracá River, Pará.
- Calayua – once spoken at the sources of the Inipucú River, Pará. (Unattested.)
- Apama – spoken by a few individuals on the Maecurú River, Pará. (Unattested.)
- Emerillon / Teko / Emereñon / Marêyo – spoken by only a few families on the Approuague River, Camopi River, Inini River, Coureni River, and Araoua River, French Guiana.
- Caripuna / Calipurn – language spoken on the Curipi River, Pará, by the mixed population of diverse origin. (Unattested.)

Southern group

- Apiacá – originally spoken between the Arinos River and Juruena River, now on the São Manoel River and Ronuro River, and on the upper course of the Tapajós River, Mato Grosso.
- Tapañuna – language of a very little known tribe that lived between the Tapanhuna River and Peixe River, state of Mato Grosso. (Unattested.)
- Timaóna – language of an unknown tribe from the Peixe River. (Unattested.)
- Raipé-Sisi / Aipé-Chichi – once spoken between the Arinos River and São Manoel River. (Unattested.)
- Makirí – spoken at the mouth of the São Manoel River.
- Pariuaia – spoken at the sources of the Barati River. (Unattested.)
- Kayabí / Parua – spoken on the lower course of the Verde River and on the Paranatina River.
- Kawahyb / Cabahyba / Kawahíwa – originally spoken in the tropical forests west of the upper course of the Tocantins River, later on the Ji-Paraná River and Marmelos River, Pará.
  - Parintintin / Nakazetí / Itoehebe – spoken between the Madeira River and Maiçí River, Pará.
  - Wiraféd / Tupi do rio Machado – spoken on the Machado River.
  - Pauaté – once spoken at the sources of the Zinho River. (Unattested.)
  - Paranawát – spoken at the mouth of the Muqui River. (Unattested.)
  - Mialat – spoken on the middle course of the Machado River. (Unattested.)
  - Takwatíp / Tacuatepe – spoken at the confluence of the Ji-Paraná River and Pimenta Bueno River.
  - Tukumaféd – spoken on the middle course of the Machado River. (Unattested.)
  - Ipoteuate – spoken on the Ji-Paraná River. (Unattested.)
  - Apairandé – spoken between the Ji-Paraná River and Maiçí River. (Unattested.)
  - Jabotiféd – spoken on a tributary of the Machado River, east of the Ipoteuate tribe. (Unattested.)
  - Dawahib / Bocas Pretas – spoken on the Anarí River, Rondônia.
  - Jaguarúb – spoken south of the Paranawát tribe. (Unattested.)
  - Hamno – spoken in the same region as Jaguarúb. (Unattested.)
  - Sanenäre – spoken in the same region as Jaguarúb, but exact location uncertain. (Unattested.)
  - Majubim – spoken at the confluence of the Pimenta Bueno River and Ji-Paraná River. (Unattested.)
- Catuquinarú – language of a Tupinized Katukina tribe, spoken on the Embira River, Amazonas.

Amazonas group

- Omagua / Campeua / Carari – originally spoken along the Amazon River between the mouth of the Juruá River and the mouth of the Napo River, now in only a few villages.
- Yurimagua / Yoriman – once spoken along the Amazon River from the mouth of the Jutaí River to the mouth, of the Purus River, now spoken by only a few of the mixed population in the city of Yurimaguas, Peru. (Unattested.)
- Aizuare – once spoken from the mouth of the Juruá River to the mouth of the Japura River. (Unattested.)
- Ibanoma / Bonama – spoken on the right bank of the Amazon River from the mouth of the Purus River to the mouth of the Juruá River; now totally extinct. (Unattested.)
- Tapajó – once spoken at the mouth of the Tapajós River (cf. Pará group). (Unattested.)
- Awakachi – once spoken at the mouth of the Auacachi River. (Unattested.)
- Papateruana – once spoken in a part of the Tupinambarana Island on the Amazon River. (Unattested.)
- Paguana – once spoken along the Amazon River from the mouth of the Cafua River to the mouth of the Tefé River. (Unattested.)
- Cocama – language spoken on a great lagoon on the left bank of the Ucayali River and near the city of Nauta, Peru.
- Cocamilla – spoken on the lower course of the Huallaga River, Peru. (Tessmann 1930, p. 82.)
- Yeté – once spoken on the Tiputini River, Loreto province, Peru. (Unattested.)
- Jibitaona – once spoken near the city of Santiago de las Montañas, Peru. (Unattested.)

Chiriguano group

- Chiriguano / Camba – spoken in the Bolivian Andes in the Serranía de Aguarugue and in the western part of the Bolivian Chaco, in Sara Province and on the upper course of the Bermejo River. Now only in the Carandaiti Valley and around Tarabuco.
- Guarayo – spoken at the sources of the Blanco River and on the San Miguel River, now in the missions of Yotaú, San Pablo, and Yaguarú, province of Santa Cruz, Bolivia.
- Pauserna / Moperecoa / Warádu-nëe – originally spoken on the Paragúa River and Tarbo River, Bolivia, now by only a few individuals on the Verde River, a tributary of the Guaporé River, Mato Grosso.
- Tapieté / Kurukwá / Yanaygua / Parapiti – spoken on the upper course of the Pilcomayo River and on the Parapití River, Paraguayan Chaco
- Izozo / Chané language – spoken on the Itiyuro River in the Campo y Durán and on the Parepetí River, Chaco.
- Siriono / Chori – language of a very primitive tribe in central Bolivia, especially in the tropical forests on the Ichillo River and Grande River, between the Blanco River and Yapacaní River, between the Ivari River and Quimore River, between the upper course of the Ivari River and Grande River, between the Piray River and Itonama River, and between the Beni River and Mamoré River.
  - Tirinié – spoken on the Mamoré River.
  - Ñeozé – spoken on the Grande River and Mamoré River.
  - Yandé – spoken on the Mamoré River. (Unattested.)
  - Jora – once spoken around the Laguna Jorá near the city of Baures.

Mawé group

- Mawé / Mauhé / Mague – originally spoken on the Tapajós Mataura River, Maué-assú River, Arapiuns River, Arichi River, and Tracuá River, in the state of Pará, now on the Uaicurapá River.
- Arapiyú / Aripuana – once spoken at the mouth of the Arapiuns River. (Unattested.)
- Andirá – once spoken south of Tupinambarana Island on the Amazon River. (Unattested.)
- Igapuitariara – once spoken at the sources of the Curauaí River. (Unattested.)
- Curiato – once spoken at the mouth of the Maricauá River. (Unattested.)
- Sapupé / Sacopé – once spoken on the Bararatí River. (Unattested.)
- Maraguá – extinct language once spoken on the right bank of the Amazon River, south of the Condurí tribe. (Unattested.)

== Proto-language ==
Proto-Tupi–Guarani
- Reconstruction of: Tupi–Guarani languages
- Reconstructed ancestors: Proto-Tupian: Proto-Maweti-Guarani

=== Schleicher (1998) ===
The following reconstructions of Proto-Tupi-Guarani are from Schleicher (1998):

Proto-Tupi–Guarani reconstructions by Schleicher (1998)

no.	gloss	Proto-Tupi-Guarani	notes
1	fruit	*ʔá; *ɨʔβa	
2	hair	*ʔáβ	
3	lie down	*ʔáβ/*ʔáw	
4	to stand	*ʔám	
5	to sit	*ʔapɨk	
6	tie up	*ʔapɨtĩ	
7	fall (human)	*ʔár	
8	say	*ʔé	
9	other, companion	*ʔirũ	
10	tree	*ʔɨ́β	
11	canoe	*ʔɨčár	
12	swim	*ʔɨtáβ	
13	they	*ʔŋã	
14	dig	*ʔók	
15	eat (trans.)	*ʔú	
16	3rd person	*aʔé	
17	seed	*aʔɨ̃y	
18	person	*aβá	
19	corn	*aβatí	
20	bad	*aíβ	
21	sharp	*aimbé	
22	man	*akʷaimbaʔé	< *kuyãʔĩ-mbaʔé ?
23	head	*akáŋ	
24	humid, wet	*akɨ́m	
25	hot	*-akúβ	
26	rain	*amán	
27	other	*amõ	
28	far	*amõ-ité	
29	old man, grandfather	*amõy	
30	no	*anĩ	
31	this	*áŋ	
32	back	*apé	
33	road	*apé ~ *peé	
34	burn	*apɨ́	
35	nose	*apũy	
36	root	*apó	
37	short	*apoʔá/*apuʔá	
38	round	*apuʔá	
39	day	*ár	
40	walk	*atá	
41	fire	*(t)atá	
42	smoke	*(t)atá-tíŋ	
43	mountain	*atɨ́r	
44	horn	*atĩ	
45	tooth	*-ãy	
46	push	*(mbo)ayán	
47	parrot	*ayurú	
48	fly	*βeβé	
49	float	*βeβúy	
50	crack, split	*βók	
51	swell	*βúr	
52	float	*βúr	
53	cord	*čám	
54	play, amuse	*-čaráy	
55	worm	*čeβoʔí	
56	wash	*čéy	
57	mother	*čɨ́	
58	clean	*čɨ́β	
59	rub	*čɨ́β	
60	smooth	*čɨ́m	
61	run (water)	*čɨrɨ́	
62	pull off	*čók	
63	to bite	*čuʔú	
64	black	*čún	
65	not	*eʔɨ́m	
66	scratch	*eʔɨ̃y	
67	belly	*eβék	
68	eye	*ečá	
69	to pull	*ekɨ́y	
70	to live	*ekó	
71	wife	*embi-rekó	
72	you	*endé	
73	saliva	*endɨ	
74	hear	*endúβ	
75	knee	*enɨpɨʔã	
76	call	*enõy	
77	see	*epʸák	
78	name	*-ér	
79	much	*-etá	
80	leg	*etɨmã	
81	smell	*-etún	
82	stone	*itá	
83	I	*iye, *iče	
84	water	*ɨ́	
85	lake	*ɨ-upá	
86	sand	*ɨʔɨtíŋ	
87	drink	*ɨʔú	
88	earth	*ɨβɨ́	
89	sky	*ɨβák	
90	cloud	*ɨβák-tíŋ	
91	tree	*ɨβɨrá	
92	wind	*ɨβɨtú	
93	belly	*ié	
94	domestic animal	*(e)ɨmbá	
95	bark	*ɨpé	
96	night	*ɨpɨtún	
97	bow	*ɨrapár/*ɨβɨrapár	
98	dust, powder	*-ɨtiʔmbór	
99	know	*kʷaáβ	
100	sun	*kʷár	
101	scrubland, forest	*kaʔá	
102	grass, weeds	*kaʔapiʔí	
103	monkey	*kaʔí	
104	suck	*kaʔmbú	
105	fat	*káβ	
106	breast	*kám	
107	bone	*káŋ	
108	scrape	*karãy	
109	eat (intrans.)	*karú	
110	good	*katú	
111	get burned	*káy	
112	sleep	*kér	
113	dirty	*kɨʔá	
114	louse	*kɨβ	
115	knife	*kɨčé	
116	fear	*čɨkɨyé	
117	green	*(a)kɨr	
118	fat	*(pi)kɨr	
119	clean	*kɨtíŋ-ʔók	
120	to cut	*kɨtĩ/*kɨti	
121	tongue	*kũ	
122	this	*ko	
123	ashes	*kočúβ	
124	sand	*kuʔí	
125	back	*kupé	
126	boy	*kurumĩ	
127	bore, perforate	*kutúk	
128	fall (object)	*kúy	
129	woman	*kuyã	
130	manioc plant	*mandí	
131	die	*manõ	
132	why	*mbaʔé	
133	sing	*mbaraká	
134	sew	*mboβúk/*mboβɨk	
135	few	*mbočapɨr	
136	throw	*(mbo)mbór	
137	snake	*mbóy	
138	dust	*-mbukú	
139	give	*meʔéŋ	
140	child	*membɨr	
141	husband	*mén	
142	animal	*miyár	
143	two	*mokõy	
144	recount	*mombeʔú	
145	ear	*nambí	
146	beat	*nupã	
147	flesh	*oʔó	
148	green	*oβɨ́	
149	leaf	*óβ	
150	house	*ók	
151	we (exclusive)	*ore	
152	all	*páβ	
153	(re)count	*papár	
154	river	*paranã	
155	one	*pé	
156	you all	*pẽẽ	
157	wing	*pepó	
158	tobacco	*petɨ́m	
159	blow	*peyú	
160	rub	*pín	
161	skin	*pír	
162	fish	*pirá	
163	bark	*pirér	
164	child	*ptáŋ/*mitáŋ	
165	foot	*pɨ́	
166	liver	*pɨʔá	
167	new	*pɨčačú	
168	catch	*pɨčɨ́k	
169	wide	*pɨpír	
170	suck	*pɨtér	
171	breath	*pɨtú	
172	hand	*pó/*mbó	
173	thin	*poʔí	
174	fingernail	*po-apẽ	
175	twist	*poán	< *poayán ?
176	heavy	*počɨ́y	
177	sing, dance	*poračéy	
178	chest	*potiʔá	
179	flower	*potɨ́r	
180	clean	*potuká	< *po-kutuk ?
181	laugh	*puká	
182	long	*pukú	
183	tie (up)	*pʷár	
184	cure	*pʷeráβ	
185	cold	*roʔɨ́	
186	swell	*rurúk	
187	ashes	*tanimbúk	< *tatá imbúk ?
188	tapir	*tapiʔír	
189	white	*tíŋ	
190	nose	*tĩ	
191	pull	*-tɨ́k	
192	father	*túβ	
193	big	*tuβiyáβ	
194	old	*tuyá	
195	arrow	*uʔɨ́β	
196	leg	*úβ	
197	egg	*upiʔá	
198	come	*úr	
199	blood	*uwɨ́	
200	tail	*uwáy	
201	old (woman)	*waiwĩ	
202	red	*-wáŋ	
203	vomit	*weʔén	
204	bird	*wɨrá	
205	ax	*yɨ́	
206	jaguar	*yaʔwár	
207	moon	*yačɨ́	
208	star	*yačɨ-tatá	
209	crocodile	*yakaré	
210	run	*yán	
211	we (inclusive)	*yande	
212	tighten	*(mbo)yár	
213	to play	*-yarú	
214	laugh	*yáy	
215	speak	*yeʔéŋ	
216	return, come back	*ye-βɨ́r	
217	grass, weeds	*yuʔũ	
218	yellow	*yúβ	
219	rotten	*yúk	
220	kill	*yuká	
221	yellow	*yukɨrɨ́	
222	salt	*yukɨ́r	
223	neck	*yúr	
224	mouth	*yurú	

=== Lemle (1971) ===
The following reconstructions of Proto-Tupi-Guarani are from Lemle (1971):

Proto-Tupi–Guarani reconstructions by Lemle (1971)

no.	gloss	Proto-Tupi-Guarani
1	to, in	*pɨpe
2	accident	*memwã
3	sharp	*aemee
4	water	*ɨ
5	some	*amõ
6	align, braid	*pẽ
7	yellow	*yub
8	tie	*apɨtĩ
9	tie	*pwar
10	walk	*ata
11	tapir	*tapiʔir
12	tightten	*momyk
13	squeeze	*pɨcɨk
14	that	*pe
15	bow	*ɨbɨrapar
16	tree	*ʔɨb
17	wing	*pepo
18	grandfather	*amõy
19	fat	*kab
20	lard	*yanɨ
21	stomach, liver	*pɨʔa
22	stomach	*ɨe
23	stomach	*ebek
24	hit	*nupã
25	drink	*ɨʔu
26	animal	*eɨmab
27	mouth	*yuru
28	float	*bebɨy
29	good	*katu
30	white	*tiŋ
31	play	*yemocaray
32	hole	*kwar
33	head	*akaŋ
34	hair	*ʔab
35	fall	*ʔar
36	path	*pe, *ape
37	field	*yũ
38	canoe	*ɨar
39	grass	*kapiʔi
40	meat	*oʔo
41	house	*ok
42	bark	*pe
43	corn drink	*kawĩ
44	dig	*ɨbɨkoy
45	dig	*yoʔok
46	basket	*karamemwã
47	sky	*ɨbak
48	call	*enõy
49	full	*por
50	smell	*etun
51	horn	*atĩ
52	horn	*ʔak
53	suck	*pɨter
54	rain	*aman
55	ashes	*tanimuk
56	coati	*kwati
57	snake	*moy
58	scratch	*eʔɨ̃y
59	eat	*ʔu
60	companion, brother	*ʔirũ
61	long	*puku
62	string	*cam
63	flow	*cɨrɨk
64	cut	*kɨtĩ
65	back	*ape
66	back	*kupe
67	sew	*mobɨk, *mobɨbɨk
68	grow	*akakuwab
69	give	*meʔeŋ
70	finger	*pwã
71	lie	*ʔab
72	tooth	*ãy
73	draw	*kwatiar
74	day	*ar
75	two	*mokõy
76	sleep	*ker
77	he	*aʔe
78	push	*moayan
79	rub	*pin
80	rub	*kɨtɨk
81	wife	*emireko
82	stand	*puʔam
83	star	*yacɨtata
84	I	*(i)ce
85	knife	*kɨce
86	speak	*yeʔeŋ
87	full	*ʔɨtarõ
88	thin	*poʔi
89	arrow	*uʔɨb
90	flower	*potɨr, *ɨbotɨr
91	fire	*tata
92	leaf	*ob
93	cold	*roʔɨ, *roʔɨca
94	fruit	*ʔa
95	smoke	*tatatiŋ, *catatiŋ
96	tobacco	*petɨm
97	pierce	*kutuk
98	claw	*pɨcãpẽ
99	like	*ʔarõ
100	large	*tubicab
101	man	*aba
102	island	*ɨpaʔũ
103	swell	*bubur
104	swell	*ruru
105	space	*paʔũ
106	go	*co
107	alligator	*yakare
108	knee	*enɨpɨʔã
109	throw	*momor
110	lake	*ɨpab, *ɨupab
111	wash	*yocey, *ey, *c-ey, *yac-ay
112	tongue	*ape-kũ, *kũ
113	smooth	*cɨm
114	far	*-mɨrɨb
115	moon	*yacɨ
116	monkey	*kaʔi
117	ax	*yɨ
118	mother	*cɨ
119	command	*pway
120	manioc	*maniʔok
121	hand	*po
122	left hand	*acu
123	husband	*men
124	kill	*yuka
125	woods	*kaʔa
126	bad	*aib, *aɨb
127	boy	*kunumĩ
128	corn	*abati
129	wet	*akɨm
130	bite	*cuʔu
131	die	*manõ
132	hill	*ɨbɨtɨr, *ɨbɨʔam (+ -usu)
133	move	*mɨ̃y
134	many	*eta, *c-eta
135	woman	*kuyã
136	variety of bird	*mɨtũ
137	swim	*ɨtab
138	nose, beak	*tĩ
139	night	*pɨtun
140	night	*pɨca
141	name	*er
142	we (excl.)	*ore
143	we (incl.)	*yane
144	new	*pɨcacu
145	cloud	*ɨbatiŋ
146	hollow	*ɨbɨ̃y
147	eye	*eca
148	jaguar	*yawar
149	ear	*nami
150	bone	*kaŋ, *kaŋ-wer
151	hear	*enub
152	egg	*upiʔa
153	father	*ub
154	pan	*yaʔẽ
155	pan	*yaẽpopo
156	parrot	*ayuru
157	pass	*pwan
158	bird	*wɨra
159	stick	*ɨbɨra
160	foot	*pɨ
161	rock	*ita
162	chest	*potiʔa
163	breast	*kam
164	fish	*pira
165	skin	*pir, *piruer
166	feather	*ab, *c-ab, *c-a-wer
167	leg	*etɨmã
168	heavy	*pocɨy
169	neck	*ayur
170	person	*akwa
171	louse	*kɨb
172	variety of gnat	*piʔũ
173	past tense	*pwer
174	black	*un, *c-un
175	black, dark	*picun
176	burn	*kay
177	burn	*apɨ
178	hot	*akub
179	tail	*uway
180	split	*mobok, *bok
181	root	*apo
182	scrape	*karãy
183	round	*apuʔa
184	breathe	*pɨtu
185	river	*paranã
186	laugh	*puka
187	know	*kuwaab
188	sat	*yukɨr
189	saliva	*enɨ
190	blood	*uwɨ
191	heal	*pwerab
192	dry	*kaŋ
193	seed	*aʔɨ̃y
194	sit	*apɨk
195	sun	*kwaracɨ
196	blow	*peyu
197	dirty	*kɨʔa
198	dirty	*ipib
199	bamboo	*takwar
200	fear	*cɨkɨye
201	land	*ɨbɨ
202	all	*pab
203	three	*mocapɨr
204	intestines	*ɨʔe
205	one	*oyepeteĩ
206	fingernail	*pwã-pẽ
207	wind	*ɨbɨtu
208	see	*epyak
209	green	*obɨ
210	worm	*ceboʔi
211	red	*waŋ
212	red	*piraŋ
213	red	*pɨtaŋ
214	pour	*(ʔ)ẽ
215	come	*ur
216	live	*eko, *ekobe
217	ffly	*bebe
218	you (sing.)	*ne, *ene
219	you (pl.)	*pe- -ẽ
220	vomit	*weʔen
221	mad	*irõ

== See also ==
- Urubú–Kaapor Sign Language
