= Canoeiro language =

Canoeiro may refer to:

- Avá-Canoeiro language
- Rikbaktsa language
