= Tapirapé language =

Tupí-Guaraní language of Brazil

Tapirapé
- apyãwa
- Native to: Brazil
- Region: Mato Grosso
- Ethnicity: Tapirapé
- Native speakers: 950 (2020)
- Language family: Tupian: Tupí–Guaraní; Group IV; Tapirapé

Language codes
- ISO 639-3: taf
- Glottolog: tapi1254
- ELP: Tapirapé
- Linguasphere: 88-AAB-ca

Tapirapé (also known as Apyãwa and Tapi'irape) is a Tupí-Guaraní language of Brazil spoken near the Araguaia River, in the border of the states of Mato Grosso and Tocantins. As of 2020, the language has around 917 speakers, who belong to the Tapirapé ethnic group.

== Etymology ==
The term "Tapirapé", originated in Tupi, means "tapir's way" (tapi'ira, tapir + apé, way). This was the way that the ancestral indigenous people called the Milky Way, and it was the name given to the people by the foreigners (mãira). Even though this was not how these indigenous people called themselves (apyãwa), the term began to be used by them as a way to identify their language and themselves, both in Portuguese and in the Tapirapé language.

== Language contact ==
Ribeiro (2012) finds a number of Apyãwa loanwords in Karajá (such as bèhyra 'carrying basket', kòmỹdawyra 'andu beans', hãrara 'macaw (sp.)', tarawè 'parakeet (sp.)', txakohi 'Txakohi ceremonial mask', hyty 'garbage (Javaé dialect)') as well as several Karajá loans in Apyãwa (tãtã 'banana', tori 'White man', marara 'turtle stew', irãwore 'Irabure ceremonial mask'). Some of the latter loans are also found in other Tupí-Guaraní languages closely related to Apyãwa, such as Parakanã and Asuriní of Trocará (sata 'banana', toria 'White man').

== Phonology ==
The phonology of the Tapirapé language originated in the Proto-Tupian language. Among its main features, the presence of alternation and vowel nasality processes stand out.

=== Vowels ===
Differently from most Tupian languages, the Tapirapé people make use of five vowel phonemes, going against the predominant six vowel system in the family. All five vowels have five nasal counterparts.

==== Oral vowels ====
	Front	Central	Back
Close	i	ɨ	o
Mid	e		o
Open	a		

- The vowel /ɨ/ is, most of the time, realised as a close central unrounded vowel. Due to the variation in the height of the tongue in the emission of vowel phonemes, this representation also includes the phoneme [ə], which only differs from /ɨ/ in its height.
- The phoneme /e/ represents both [e̞] and [ɛ], depending on the height variation of the tongue in one's mouth.
- The vowel /i/ is realised as a close front unrounded vowel.
- Unlike other vowel phonemes, the nature of the vowel /o/ is controversial; it is seen as an interpretation of the vowel u, [o], and ɔ, all of which are rounded and back vowels. The use of the phoneme /o/ as a representative of this set is influenced by the vowel evolution of Asuríni, a similar language, where the Proto-Tupian phoneme [u] was neutralised into [o].

==== Nasal vowels ====
	Front	Central	Back
Close	ĩ	ɨ̃	õ
Mid	ẽ		õ
Open	ã		

=== Consonants ===
	Labial	Alveolar	Postalvoelar	Velar	Glottal
Plosive	b	t		k kʷ	ʔ
Nasal	m	n		ŋ	
Tap		ɾ			
Fricative					h
Approximant			j	w	

- Yonne Leite, in his article about the syllabic structure of Tapirapé, mentions that /j/ has five possible allophones: [tʃ], [tʲ], [ɲ], and [j̃]. He says that, in onsets, [tʲ] and [tʃ] appear frequently, while [j] appears in codas and in onsets of posttonic syllables when, in the nucleus of the syllable, the vowel is oral. The palatal nasal and the nasal palatal approximant appear in the codas of a tonic syllable and in the onset of a posttonic syllable when, in the nucleus of the syllable, the vowel is nasal.
