= Ayaya =

Ayaya may refer to:

- Aya Matsuura, Japanese singer and actress
- Aya Komichi (Ayaya), a character from Kin-iro Mosaic anime and manga series
- Guajá language, also known as Ayaya
- "Mamacita (Ayaya)", a song of South Korean band Super Junior
