= Zoʼé =

Indigenous people in Brazil

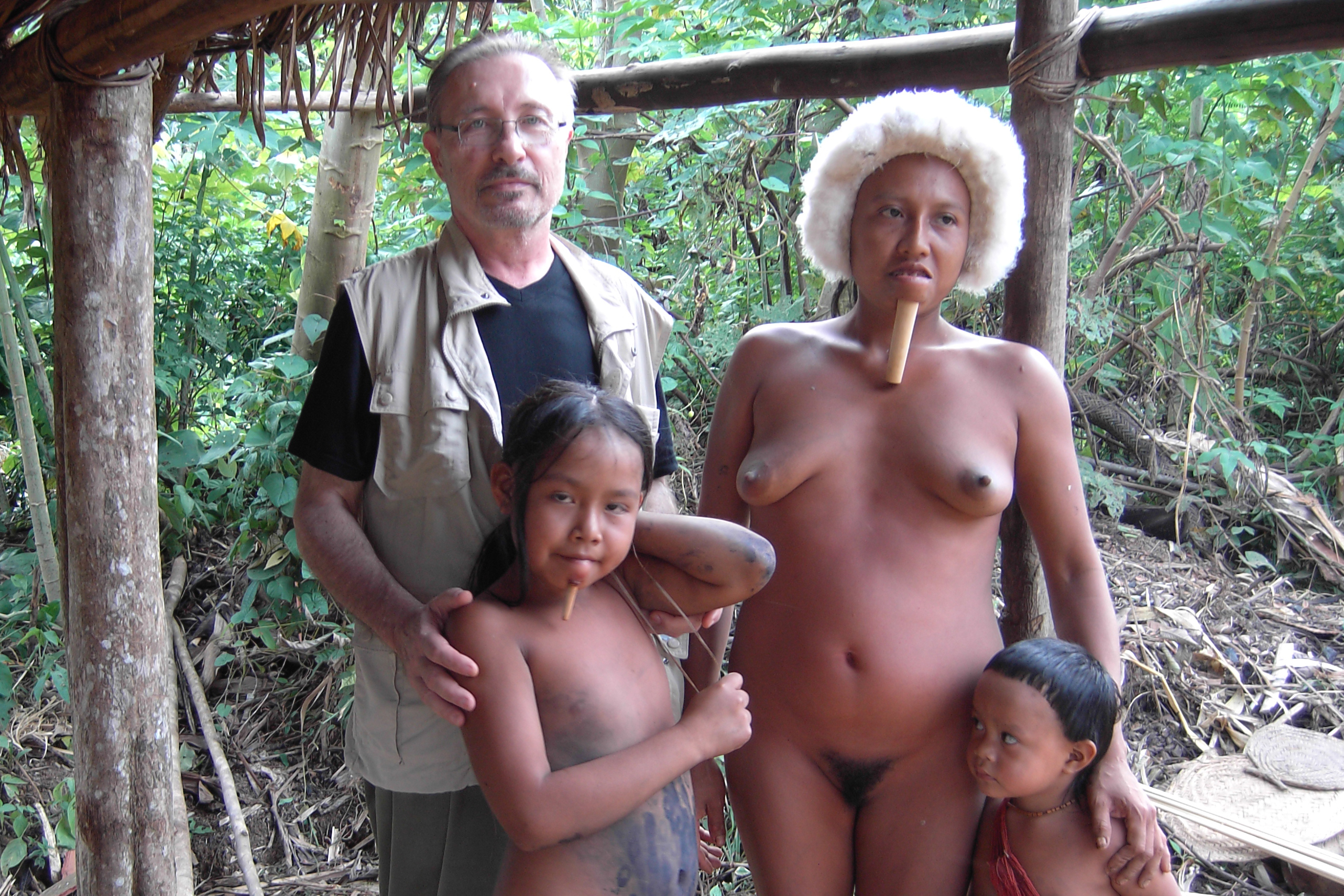
- Albert Abril in the Amazon, with a Zoʼé family

Total population
- 256 (2010)

Regions with significant populations
- Brazil (Pará)

Languages
- Zoʼé

Religion
- traditional tribal religion

Related ethnic groups
- Wayampi

The Zoʼé people are an Indigenous people of Brazil in the State of Pará, Municipality of Óbidos, on the Cuminapanema River, Brazil. They are a Tupi–Guarani people.

== Name ==
They are also known as the Poturu, Poturujara, or Buré. The term "Zoʼé" means "us", as opposed to non-Indians or enemies. The term "Poturu" is the type of wood used to make the embe'po labrets which they wear.

== Language ==
The Zoʼé language belongs to Subgroup VIII of the Tupi-Guarani language family.

== Culture ==
All Zoʼé wear the poturu, a wooden plug piercing the bottom lip. The Zoʼé have a tradition where new fathers have the backs of their calves cut with the 'tooth of a small rodent'. The marriage rituals of the Zoʼé are complex and not fully understood. It is not known how many wives or husbands one is allowed to have. Many women practice polyandry. One or more husbands may be "learning husbands": young men learning how to be good spouses, in exchange for hunting for the rest of the family.

In the state of Para, Northern Brazil, in one of the last still largely unexplored rainforests in the world, a new tribe, the Zoʼé, was recently contacted. They live between the Amazon River and the country of Suriname. The Zoʼé are part of the Tupi linguistic group. Little is known about them. They are semi-nomadic hunters and gatherers. Their favorite prey is monkey, which is plentiful in the region during the dry season. During the rainy season, the Zoʼé rely on a root plant called manioc, which must be processed into flour to avoid its poisonous properties.

— Jean-Pierre Dutilleux

== In film ==
The Salt of the Earth documents the work of photographer Sebastião Salgado including his photographs of the Zoʼé.
