= Amanayé language =

Endangered Tupian language of Brazil

Amanayé
- Native to: Brazil
- Region: Pará, São Domingos do Capim
- Ethnicity: Amanayé people
- Extinct: 2001?
- Language family: Tupian: Tupi–Guaraní; Xingu; Amanayé

Language codes
- ISO 639-3: ama
- Glottolog: aman1266
- ELP: Amanayé
- Linguasphere: 88-AAA-ca
- Amanayé is classified as Extinct by the UNESCO Atlas of the World's Languages in Danger.

Amanayé (Amanaje) is a possibly extinct Tupi language last spoken in the town of São Domingos do Capim in Pará State, Brazil. The closely related but possibly distinct language is Ararandewara, which is spoken at the headwaters of the Moju River. It is unknown whether the Amanayé continue to speak the language or not.
