= Xeta language =

Nearly extinct Tupian language of Brazil

Xeta
- Native to: Brazil
- Region: Paraná
- Ethnicity: 69 Xetás (2020)
- Native speakers: 2 (2014)
- Language family: Tupian: Tupí–Guaraní; Xeta

Language codes
- ISO 639-3: xet
- Glottolog: xeta1241
- ELP: Xetá
- Linguasphere: 88-AAI-ea

Xeta is a nearly extinct Tupí–Guaraní language formerly spoken in the Paraná state of Brazil.

== Vocabulary ==
Xetá vocabulary (Fernandes 1958: 10-13): A transcription is also available online.

Português	English	Xetá
língua	tongue	inko
boca	mouth	dióri
dente	tooth	nénai
nariz	nose	sapôta
olho	eye	imahâ
orelha	ear	ñambi
cabeça (parte superior)	top of head	tixapotê
cabeça (total)	head (entire)	ñakankaue
cabelo	hair	ñâka
barba	beard	tirá
mão	hand	êpo
cotovelo	elbow	ama
polegar	thumb	tikaáudio
dedo mínimo	little finger	inkanawakan
unha	fingernail	puâpe
pé em geral	foot	prohá
coxa	thigh	ñôr
panturrilha	calf	etâma-la
joelho	knee	enápua
perna	leg	etâma
unha do pé	toenail	posiâpe
casco de animal	animal hoof	posiâbe
costela	rib	ñalóka
peito	chest	pasiá
mamelão do homem	male nipple	ikãta
seio	breast	kamoá
mamelão feminino	female nipple	ikãta
pele	skin	êti
osso	bone	inkã
sangue	blood	hôga
veia (vaso sangüíneo)	vein (blood vessel)	hâdia
carne	flesh, meat	haikâ
coração	heart	henia
água	water	hôñe
rio	river	?
regato	stream	?
fogo	fire	haikela
fumaça	smoke	tatâde
cinza	ash	tatâupa
carvão de madeira	charcoal	tátâbui
céu	sky	tataka
cerração, nevoeiro	fog, mist	hawãndie
chuva	rain	atêg
orvalho	dew	achabue
vento	wind	awôto
relâmpago	lightning	auêra
arco-íris	rainbow	nitiô
sol	sun	enexâve
aurora	dawn	kádo
dia	day	alâdia
noite	night	poá
manhã	morning	memóe
tarde	afternoon	kerakadso
lua	moon	nhanetavetoa
estrela	star	iatêda
plêiades	Pleiades	hetai
terra, solo	earth, soil	ewûa
caminho (trilha de índio)	path (Indigenous trail)	péka
selva, floresta	jungle, forest	ñyata
areia	sand	takarói
pedra	stone	itá
casa	house	tâpui
cesta	basket	pinako, eváitá
lenha	firewood	niapiá
aparelho ignígeno	fire-making apparatus	tatail
lasca de madeira (cavaco)	wood chip, splinter	hágue
abanador, esteira	fan, mat	tapéguá
machado	axe	nepraka
arco	bow	guarâba
corda de arco	bowstring	napádia
flecha	arrow	vûá
emplumação da flecha	arrow fletching	upéba
flecha com ponta de madeira barbelada	arrow with barbed wooden point	alauête
flecha para pássaro	bird arrow	narâpia
clava	club	auêrapingebo
punção (pequeno osso aguçado)	awl (small sharpened bone)	haikiinka
tanga	loincloth	hamiakâ
flauta de Pã	pan flute	tâgua
cabaça (fruto)	gourd (fruit)	kôgua
cabaça (recipiente)	gourd (container)	amawá
canto	song, singing	aprai
nome (grupo de índios de Dourados)	name (Indigenous group of Dourados)	xetá
botocudo (homem com ornato labial)	man wearing a lip ornament	heméta
varão (homem)	man (male)	kanome
marido	husband	teiradwa
pai	father	mai
mãe	mother	hai
criança	child	nieue kauai
filho	son	timêmo
menino	boy	txigoi, xigoi
irmão	brother	mendjâgoi
irmã	sister	nadsiaguê
mulher	woman	ñanekoinha, kôña
esposa	wife	simirâda
filha (menina)	daughter (girl)	tiguá
filha (jovem moça)	daughter (young woman)	timémo
velho	old man	diâlei, diarei
velha	old woman	dihárei
amigo	friend	diakâda
inimigo	enemy	nhadiakáte
fantasma	ghost	möuel
alma	soul	nhang
sonho	dream	ákâña
macaco	monkey	krâkoi
bugio	howler monkey	huimá
onça pintada	jaguar	haiköpintai
puma	puma	punahai
veado	deer	hehehai
lontra	otter	hame-ai
anta	tapir	telâgoihai
capivara	capybara	haikehüra
paca	paca	hum-hai
porco-do-mato	peccary (general)	huhai
queixada	white-lipped peccary	haikenhuai
quati	coati	haikancai
tamanduá-bandeira	giant anteater	moko hehai
tamanduá-mirim	southern tamandua	moko-atai
camundongo	mouse	hararau
ratazana	rat	hararau
lebre	hare	têká
tatu	armadillo	hekeldiâve
pássaro pequeno	small bird	gurokihánge
ovo	egg	[em branco]
jacu	guan (bird)	kukai
jacutinga	black-fronted piping guan	pinpiai
urubu (corvo)-preto	black vulture	fofoai
urubu (corvo) branco	white vulture	peke-hararau
urubu (corvo)-de-cabeça-vermelha	turkey vulture	niampine
pombo grande	large pigeon	hãhãhai
pombo pequeno	small pigeon	hehai
peixe	fish	radja
cobra	snake	moi
cobra cascavel	rattlesnake	diagoi
sapo	toad	ndoi
lagarto	lizard	moihiruai
formiga	ant	arará
mosquito	mosquito	malêgue
mosca	fly	mêro
abelha	bee	êi
mel	honey	ikânge
gafanhoto	grasshopper	toko
vespa	wasp	kawá
piolho	louse	kö
aranha	spider	ñadú
árvore	tree	áuéra
folha	leaf	há
casca de árvore	tree bark	ipegwa
raiz	root	hâpó
espinho	thorn	hâté
resina	resin	huawaai
flor	flower	debótérame
taquara (bambu)	bamboo	tákua
cana, caniço (criciúma)	cane, reed (criciúma)	kailekomhuá
grande	big, large	halêdja, hauidja
pequeno	small	teai
alto	tall, high	niauai
velho	old	inama
frio	cold	ñrandja
quente	hot	hâko
molhado	wet	awaba
doente	sick	hâde
branco	white	katahai
preto	black	hûntai
vermelho	red	putâdai
azul	blue	awete
verde	green	awete
não	no	ñiá
