= Tenetehara languages =

Language group

Tenetehara
- Tupi–Guarani subgroup IV
- Geographic distribution: Brazil
- Linguistic classification: Tupian: Tupi–Guarani; Tenetehara
- Subdivisions: Akwáwa; Avá-Canoeiro; Tapirapé; Tenetehára; Turiwára

Language codes
- ISO 639-3: –
- Glottolog: tupi1279

The Tenetehára or Teneteharan languages (also known as Tupi–Guarani IV) are a subgroup of the Tupi–Guarani language family.

Along with Timbira and the Northern Tupi–Guarani languages, the Tenetehara languages form part of the lower Tocantins-Mearim linguistic area.

== Languages ==
The Tenetehara languages are:

- Akwáwa (dialects: Asuriní, Suruí do Pará, Parakanã)
- Avá-Canoeiro
- Tapirapé
- Tenetehára (dialects: Guajajara, Tembé)
- Turiwára
