= Tupinambarana =

Former Brazilian fluvial island

Native name: Ilha Tupinambarana
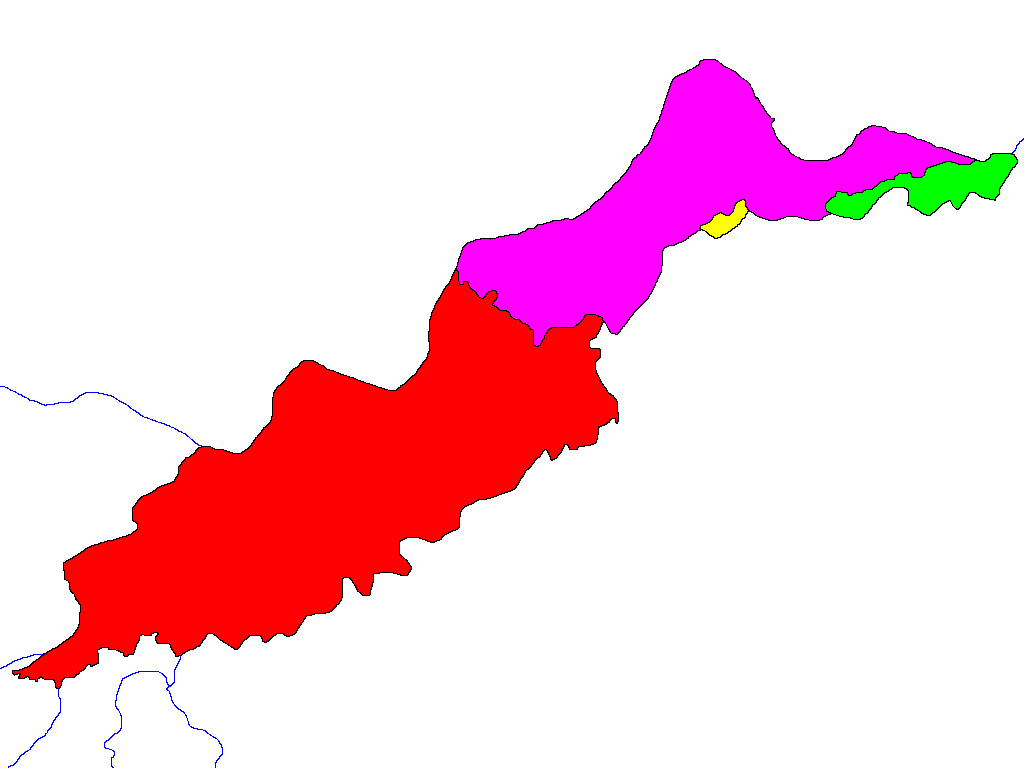
- The four islands of Ilha Tupinambarana

- Location within Brazil

Geography
- Location: North Region, Brazil
- Coordinates: 3°00′S 58°00′W
- Area: 11,850 km^{2} (4,580 sq mi)
- Area rank: 63rd (by total area of 4 islands)

Administration
- Brazil
- State: Amazonas
- Largest settlement: Parintins (pop. 109,150)

Ilha Tupinambarana is a former fluvial island bordered by rivers of the Amazon system (Amazon, Madeira, Ramos, Uraria, and Abacaxis) in eastern Amazonas, Brazil. It has been split into four completely separate parts by natural channels, just like those isolating it from the mainland. The original island stretched from the municipalities of Parintins, in the northeast, to Nova Olinda do Norte, in the southwest. The combined area of the islands is to 11,850 km^{2}, making Ilha Tupinambarana the second largest fluvial group of islands in the world after Bananal Island. The largest of the four parts is the 93rd largest island in the world and the 3rd largest island in Brazil.
