= Yotaú =

Coordinates: 16°03′S 63°03′W

- Town
- Interactive map of Yotaú
- Country: Bolivia
- Department: Santa Cruz Department
- Time zone: UTC-4 (BOT)

Yotaú is a small town in Bolivia.
