= Emerillon language =

Tupian language spoken in French Guiana

Emerillon
- Teko
- Region: French Guiana
- Ethnicity: Emerillon people
- Native speakers: 400 (2012)
- Language family: Tupian: Tupi–Guaraní; Wayampí; Emerillon

Language codes
- ISO 639-3: eme
- Glottolog: emer1243
- ELP: Emerillon
- Linguasphere: 88-AAA-a

Emerillon (endonym Teko; also known as Emerilon, Emerion, Mereo, Melejo, Mereyo, Teco) is a language belonging to the Tupi–Guarani family, one of the most heavily researched language families in Amazonia. The languages related most closely to Emerillon are Wayampípukú, Wayampí, and Jo'é.

Emerillon is spoken by a small community residing in two areas of French Guiana: the Maroni River and the Oyapock-Camopi confluence. The speakers of Emerillon refer to themselves and their language as Teko.

The last recorded number of Emerillon speakers was 410, as recorded in 2010. The language is currently listed as endangered due to the extremely low number of speakers. However, the language is still being actively passed onto each generation and taught as a first language, with very little influence from the widely spoken tongues of the area.

== Classification ==
Emerillon belongs to the Tupi–Guarani language branch of the Tupi family. Within this family, Emerillon is found within subgroup VIII along with the Wayampi language, Wayampípukú, Guajá, and several other Amazonian languages (the Wayampi language being its closest relative in similarity and proximity of native speakers).

== History ==
Emerillon is a language that shares many components with outside sources. It borrows words from Creoles, French, and other American Indian languages (given its position in French Guiana alongside other tribes). Amongst the many tribes in French Guiana, Emerillon makes very little contact with other tribes or foreigners since they have been able to mitigate their decreasing population in the mid 1900s. Before then, Emerillon was built from its own speakers and the inter-tribal communication within the Tupi-Guarani family. Many of the Tupi languages share similar traits, such as the use of SOV syntax and word commonalities. Wayampi is the closest language to Emerillon in the Tupi family, and its speakers are also the closest tribe to the Teko people. Upon the arrival of major world powers, first by Spain in 1496, The native people in what is now French Guiana were first impressed upon by foreign influence. When the French settled and colonized the territory in the 1600s, the Emerillon began to borrow words and speech patterns.

Before the first major communications between the foreign superpowers of the time and the Emerillon speakers, it is difficulty to say exactly where and when the language was first developed and how it changed over time, because the Teko people and other native tribes of the area were not entered into recorded history until that point.

Several of the studies on the Teko people pre-1970 offer the idea that the population had descended to a mere 50 native Emerillon speakers. The most recent census recording of the Teko population however find that there are at least 400 native speakers of Emerillon in French Guiana. This is not to say, however, that the Teko population is not on the decline, or has not suffered heavy loss. In the 1700s and 1800s, the immense depopulation began. Out of all of the tribal families in French Guiana, the Tupi family, of which the Teko are a part of, has suffered the heaviest of losses. In fact, the Teko people suffered the second highest loss in population of all the Tupi tribes, depopulating at a rate of 88% since then.

Much of the depopulation of the Teko people and neighboring tribes is due to deadly epidemics such as influenza and malaria, causing as much as an 88% decrease in the population rate since the turn of the 19th century. These epidemics were brought by the Tupi tribes' contact with foreigners, which happened to be slightly higher than most other tribe families. The foreign settlers in the area, namely the French, also incited warfare between the native tribes, resulting in further deaths.

These instances of contact with the French and other foreign countries did influence the language to some degree. For example, the French language influenced nasality into Emerillon, although in Emerillon, nasality is used in segments throughout a phrase. A French word that ends with a nasal vowel will become completely nasal in the Emerillon equivalent. Since the mid 20th century, the Teko are only seen communicating with the Wayampi (Waiãpi) speakers. The Wayampi language is also the closest remaining language to Emerillon, and the two are mutually understood to an extent. In the 1950s, medical assistance became available to several tribes including the Teko, allowing for their steady and dangerous decline in population to cease and level off around the current population. This remaining population actively passes on the language through each generation, maintaining its importance and position as the official language of the Teko people.

Considering the numerous studies of the Emerillon speakers from before 1970 that found there to be below 100 speakers, the introduction of medical assistance, and the subsequent 2010 census finding that places 410 speakers of Emerillon in French Guiana, there is evidence of a population surge over the last half century. The Emerillon language came dangerously close to extinction.

The Emerillon culture is rich in storytelling and tradition. The Teko people place great importance on natural resources and a culture based upon the Earth around them, and this is evident in their mythology and storytelling. One such story describes the tale of a worm that visits an Emerillon woman, falls in love with her, and becomes a man in order to woo her. This worm-man realizes the difficult and hard-working lifestyle of her people, and takes his new lover and her family to his worm people who agree to help them. The worm people give them plentiful resources: corn, maize, cassava, and other crops. They plant some of their crops, and when the worm man tells his lover to go and look for more of the resources that they have grown, she is afraid to search and does not go immediately. When she eventually goes to check for resources, the harvest is weak. Furthermore, this brief summarization of the Emerillon folk tale shows the emphasis on the importance of hard work and a strong relationship with the Earth and its resources. It also highlights the language's deep connection with nature.

== Geographic distribution ==
The native Emerillon speakers (the Teko people) reside in a small part of French Guiana, a colony in South America settled by the French in the late 16th century, located between Suriname and Brazil, bordering the Atlantic Ocean. The Teko are found in the southernmost point of the country, and are split into two areas. One group resides in on the Tampoc River, and the second is found near Camopi. The Emerillon speakers are believed to have been in these areas since the 1600s, with definite reason known as to why they reside in two separate locations. Both groups communicate with each other, and on rare occasions with neighboring tribes such as the Wayampi, whose language is understood by the Emerillon. Emerillon is still passed on from generation to generation thanks to the minuscule amount of outside influence on the Teko people, and despite the low number of speakers, the language does not appear to be going extinct anytime soon if tradition holds.

== Official status ==
Emerillon is endangered, and is not the official language of any one country. Emerillon is categorized as an Endangered language due to the steadily low population of around 400 speakers (Most recent census measuring 410 speakers).

== Dialects ==
Emerillon does not have any known dialects.

== Phonology ==
=== Consonants ===
There are several consonants found in the Emerillon language that descend from various external languages and influences. Emerilllon uses the labiovelar consonant [kʷ], which is a common vocal sound used in Africa and the southern Americas. In Emerillon, the "y" is also pronounced as a "j." The language also features glottal stops, transcribed in IPA as [ʔ].

Emerillon Consonants
		Bilabial	Alveolar	Palatal	Velar	Lab.-vel.	Glottal
Plosive	voiceless	p	t	tʃ	k	kʷ	ʔ
Plosive	voiced	b	d	dʒ	g		ʔ
Fricative	voiceless		s				h
Fricative	voiced		z				
Liquid			ɾ				
Semivowel		w		j			

=== Vowels ===
Emerillon Vowels
	Front	Central	Back
Close	i	ɨ	u
Mid	e	ə	o
Open		a	

=== Prosody ===
In addition to the phonology, the Emerillon language contains a definite prosody which is common amongst the other similar Tupi family languages. An expression meant to stand out or hold importance tends to vary broadly in pitch, with the highest pitch points being placed on the verb or verbs. Considering the SOV syntax format of the language, this means that a potent phrase will increase in pitch until the verb, where the major accent is found.

== Orthography ==
Emerillon is spelt phonetically based on the International Phonetic Alphabet, and not according to the French orthography. The spelling uses the letter ɨ for the close central unrounded vowel between i and u. e is always pronounced é, vowels with a tilde are always nasal (ã, ẽ, ĩ, õ, ũ), ö is like the German O umlaut, and b is pronounced mb. All letters are pronounced.

== Grammar ==
=== Morphology ===
Emerillon, similarly to the other languages of the Tupi-Guarani family, is an agglutinative language. The language contains many morphemes that are modified. Prefixes are rarely used, and when they are, they tend to indicate gender and recognize a person. Suffixes are very common, and in fact are used to modify most words.

The language also has signs of polysynthesis, and therefore often utilizes the combination of many morphemes and suffixes to create a single word or expression.

In this example cited by Erika Coljin, three words are added to the base morpheme "karu" (to eat) as if they are tailing suffixes in order to create one more meaningful word consisting of the action, time, purpose, etc.

Karu-rire-guá-icha
eat-after-PURPOSE-like
'as if for dessert'

=== Syntax ===
The syntax of Emerillon is most commonly SOV (subject, object, verb). However, this is not always the case when either the subject or object are not realized in the sentence.

Examples of Emerillon word order:

Mama baʔerupiʔa o-bo-siu-siu
Mum eggs 3.I-CAUS-REDUP-fry
'Mum used to fry eggs.'

Orone-karakuri-nam pe-r-upi oro-ho-tar-uwe
1EXCL.II-money-when way-RELN-on 1EXCL.I-go-FUT-too
'When we have money, we'll go that way too.'

Wanemaʔẽ za-ɨkɨdʒ-taɾ apam-a-wi
good-REL INDET.I-take-FUT foreigner-REF-ABL
'We will take the good things to the foreigners.'

== Sample texts ==
a-ʔɨta ʔɨ-pope
1SG.I-swim river-in
'I swim in the river.'

d-o-ʔu-dʒi sautu
NEG-3.I-eat-NEG salt
'She does not eat salt.'

Teko-a-te ere-dʒu!
Emerillon-REF-FOC 2SG.I-be
'Emerillon you are!'

== Bibliography ==
- Clopper, C., & Tonhauser, J. (2013). The Prosody of Focus in Paraguayan Guaraní. International Journal of American Linguistics, 79(2), 219-251. doi:10.1086/669629
- Daveau, M., Rivat, L., Langaney, A., Afifi, N., Bois, E., & Ropartz, C. (1975). Gm and Inv Allotypes in French Guiana Indians. Human Heredity, 25(2), 88-92. JSTOR 245101140
- Davy Damien, Isabelle Tritsch & Pierre Grenand. 2012. Construction and territorial restructuring among the Wayãpi and Teko of the commune of Camopi, French Guyana, Confins [Online], 16. doi:10.4000/confins.7964
- De Souza Aguiar, G. (1991). Ethnohistory, Intertribal Relationships, and Genetic Diversity among Amazonian Indians. Human Biology, 63(6), 743-762. JSTOR 241464230
- Ferraz Gerardi, Fabrício et al. 2021. Tupían Lexical Database: Tekó. https://doi.org/10.5281/zenodo.5655343
- Gordon, M., & Rose, F. (2006). Émérillon Stress: A Phonetic and Phonological Study. Anthropological Linguistics, 48(2), 132-168. JSTOR 225132376
- Grenand, P. (1995). Guyane française: Le parc de la forêt tropicale et les amérindiens. Journal De La Société Des Américanistes, 81, 294-298. JSTOR 224605791
- Grenand, Pierre; Grenand, Françoise (2017). "Pour une histoire de la cartographie des territoires teko et wayãpi (Commune de Camopi, Guyane française)". Open Edition. Revue d'ethnoécologie (in French) (11). doi:10.4000/ethnoecologie.3007.
- Larrouy Georges, Y. Marty, Ruffié Jacques. (1965). Étude hémotypologique des populations indiennes de la Guyane française; I. les groupes érythrocytaires. Bulletins et Mémoires de la Société d'anthropologie de Paris, XI° Série. Tome 7 fascicule 1, 1965. pp. 107–117.
- Hurault, J., & Frenay, P. (1963). Les Indiens Émerillon de la Guyane française. Journal de la Société des Américanistes 52, nouvelle série, 133-156. JSTOR 224718268
- Perret, J. (1933). Observations et documents sur les Indiens Émerillon de la Guyane française. Journal de la Société des Américanistes 25(1), nouvelle série, 65-97. JSTOR 24601579
- Rose, F. (2009). A hierarchical indexation system: the example of Emerillon (Teko). In New challenges in typology: Transcending the borders and refining the distinctions, 63, 83.
- Sutter, J. (1967). Interprétation démographique de la fréquence des groupes sanguins chez les Wayana et les Emerillon de la Guyane. Population (French edition), 22(4), 709-734. doi:10.2307/1528776
- Tchen, P., Bois, E., Lanset, S., & Feingold, N. (1981). Blood Group Antigens in the Emerillon, Wayampi, and Wayana Amerindians of French Guiana. Human Heredity, 31(1), 47-53. JSTOR 245101639
- Tonhauser, J., & Colijn, E. (2010). Word Order In Paraguayan Guaraní. International Journal of American Linguistics, 76(2), 255-288. doi:10.1086/652267
