= Aurê–Aurá language =

Extinct language of Brazil

Aurê–Aurá
- Aurá
- Native to: Brazil
- Region: Maranhão, formerly Pará
- Extinct: September 20, 2025, with the death of Aurá
- Language family: Tupian: Tupi–Guaraní; Xingu; Aurê–Aurá

Language codes
- ISO 639-3: aux
- Glottolog: aura1243
- ELP: Auré
- Linguasphere: 88-HAA-ac
- Aurê–Aurá is classified as Extinct according to the Endangered Languages Project.

Aurê–Aurá is an extinct language, part of the Tupi language family, last spoken by two individuals in Maranhão, Brazil, named Aurê and Aurá. Both known speakers originally came from west of Marabá, Pará. The language primarily used nouns, with few adjectives or verbs. Aurê died in 2014, leaving Aurá as the last known speaker of the language. Aurá died on September 20, 2025, at the age of 77, marking the definitive extinction of the language.

== Vocabulary ==
Vocabulary of the language of Aurê and Aurá
Aurê–Aurá	Gloss
jiti	sweet potato
iwe	sky
kutu	to pierce
maniʔa	manioc
inẽ	beetle
pana	butterfly
ã	to stand
petã	tobacco
amã	rain
pitũ	night
tokõ	toucan
akã	head
uʔi	arrow
jutai	jatobá tree
u	father
ʔa	to fall
puti	flower
ci	honey
pa	to jump
arawe	cockroach
aꞵe	man
awuti	tortoise
tai	ant
tajau	peccary
kic	hammock
korai	sun
urui	surubim (fish)
tupã	rope
jaɨ	moon
uʔu	he bites
he	I
hɨ	mother
atʃa	I see
aka	I sleep
pira	skin
jakara	alligator
pa	way
are	macaw
kwe	hole
awe	man
ie	canoe
ke	wasp
pek	paca
watĩ	to walk
tatĩ	fire
iĩ	fruit
ʔi	water
ji	ax
mitu	mutum bird
nopõ	to hit
toʔi	parrot
pepa	wing
a	house
pa	hand
topõ	thunder
pwarã	to recover
tapiʔi	tapir
wari	howler monkey
taku	stone
