= Dourado River (São Paulo) =

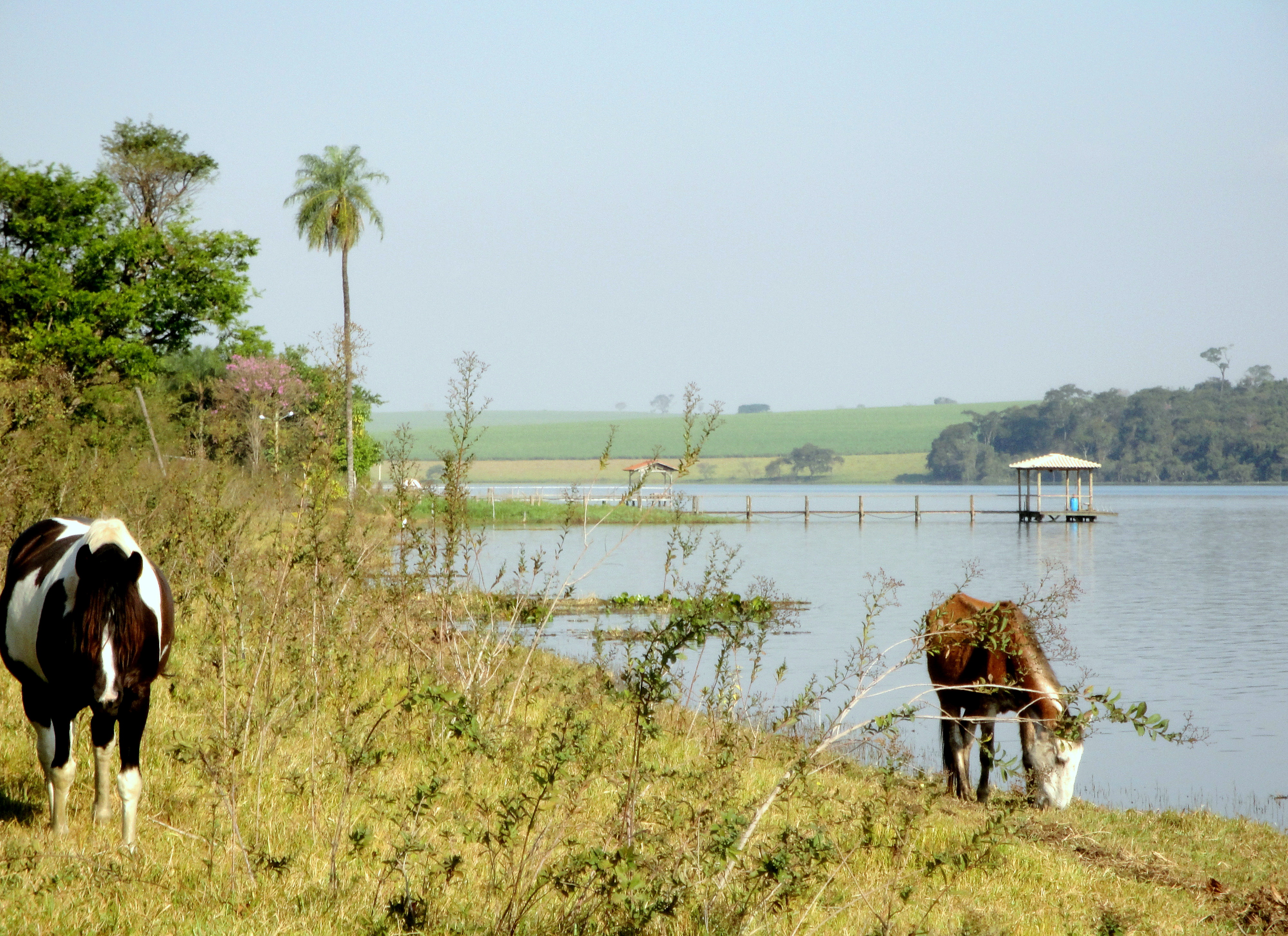

Location
- Country: Brazil

Physical characteristics
- Source
  - location: Pirajuí (São Paulo state)
- Mouth: Tietê River
  - coordinates: 21°22′S 49°41′W

The Dourado River is a river of São Paulo state in southeastern Brazil.

== See also ==
- List of rivers of São Paulo
