= Araweté language =

Tupian language spoken in Brazil

Araweté
- Native to: Brazil
- Region: Amazonas
- Native speakers: 280 (2006)
- Language family: Tupian: Tupi–Guarani; Xingu; Araweté

Language codes
- ISO 639-3: awt
- Glottolog: araw1273
- ELP: Araweté
- Linguasphere: 88-AAF-aa
- Araweté is classified as Vulnerable by the UNESCO Atlas of the World's Languages in Danger.

Araweté is a Tupi–Guaraní language of the state of Amazonas, in the Amazon region of Brazil. Nearly all speakers were monolingual in 1986.

== Phonology ==
=== Vowels ===
	Front	Central	Back
Close	i ĩ	ɨ ɨ̃	
Mid	e ẽ		o õ
Open		a ã	

Phoneme	Allophones
/e/	[e], [ɛ]
/o/	[o], [ɔ], [ɤ], [ʊ], [ɯ], [u]
/ã/	[ã], [ə̃]
/õ/	[õ], [ũ]

=== Consonants ===
		Labial	Alveolar	Palatal	Velar	Glottal
Nasal		m	n	ɲ		
Plosive	voiceless	p	t	tʃ	k	ʔ
Plosive	voiced		d			ʔ
Continuant		w	ɾ	j		h

Phoneme	Allophones
/t/	[t], [ts], [tʲ]
/d/	[d], [dᶻ], [dʲ], [ð]
/tʃ/	[tʃ], [tʃʲ]
/m/	[m], [b]
/w/	[w], [β]
/j/	[j], [j̃], [ɲ], [ɲʲ], [dʒ]
