= Zoʼé language =

Tupian language spoken in Brazil

Zoʼé
- Poturu, Poturujara, Buré
- Jo'é
- Native to: Brazil
- Region: Pará, Obidos Municipality, Cuminapanema River
- Ethnicity: Zoʼé
- Native speakers: (150 cited 1998)
- Language family: Tupian: Tupi–Guarani; Wayampí; Zoʼé

Language codes
- ISO 639-3: pto
- Glottolog: zoee1240
- ELP: Zo'é
- Linguasphere: 88-AAD-aa

Zoʼé (Joʼé) is a Tupian language spoken by the indigenous Zoʼé people of Pará, Brazil. It is close to the Emerillon language.

Zoʼé is also known as Zoé, Buré, Poturu, Poturujara, and Tupí of Cunimapanema.

== Phonology ==
Zo’é has the following vowels and consonants as depicted in the tables below.

=== Consonants ===
		Bilabial		Dental/ Alveolar		Palatal (-alveolar)		Velar			Glottal	
		plain	pal.	plain	sib./pal.	plain	lab.	plain	pal.	lab.	plain	pal.
Nasal		m	mʲ	n	nʲ			ŋ	ŋʲ			
Plosive/ Affricate	voiceless	p	pʲ	t		t͡ʃ	t͡ʃʷ	k	kʲ	kʷ	ʔ	
Plosive/ Affricate	voiced	b	bʲ	d		d͡ʒ		ɡ	ɡʲ	gʷ		
Fricative	voiceless	ɸ		θ	s						h	hʲ
Fricative	voiced	β		ð								
Sonorant		w		ɾ		j						

=== Vowels ===
	Front		Central		Back	
	oral	nasal	oral	nasal	oral	nasal
Close	i	ĩ	ɨ	ɨ̃	u	ũ
Close-mid	e	ẽ			o	õ
Open-mid	ɛ	ɛ̃			ɔ	ɔ̃
Open			a	ã		
