= Ararandewára language =

Extinct language of Brazil

Ararandewára
- Ararandeūara
- Native to: Brazil
- Region: Moju River, Pará
- Ethnicity: Ararandewara
- Era: attested 1913–14
- Language family: Tupian: Tupi–Guaraní; Xingu; Ararandewára

Language codes
- ISO 639-3: xaj
- Glottolog: None aman1266 Amanayé

Ararandewára is an extinct language formerly spoken on the Moju River in the state of Pará, Brazil.
