= Turiwára language =

Extinct Tupian language of Brazil

Turiwára
- Native to: Brazil
- Region: Pará
- Ethnicity: Turiwára people
- Extinct: (date missing)
- Language family: Tupian: Tupi–Guarani; Tenetehara; Turiwára

Language codes
- ISO 639-3: twt
- Glottolog: turi1247
- Linguasphere: 88-AAB-ad

Turiwára is an extinct Tupi–Guaraní language of the state of Pará, in the Amazon region of Brazil.
