= Avá-Canoeiro language =

Tupian language spoken in Brazil

Avá-Canoeiro
- Ãwa
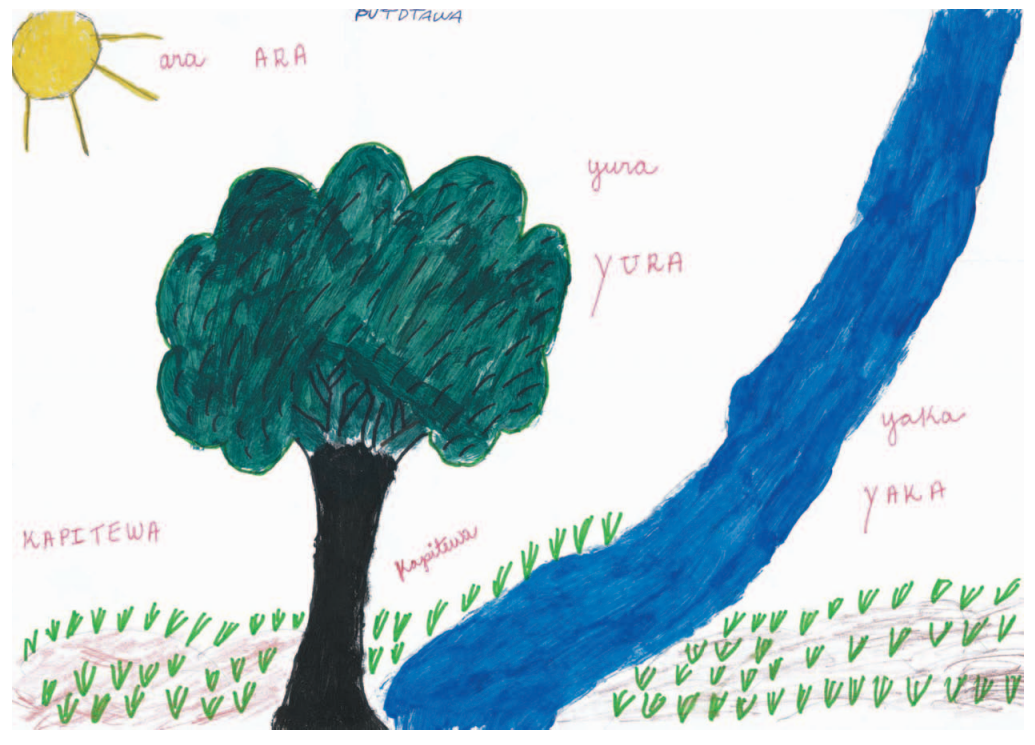
- A drawing with Avá-Canoeiro text
- Native to: Brazil
- Region: Goiás
- Ethnicity: 46 (2009)
- Native speakers: 14 (2006)
- Language family: Tupian: Tupi–Guarani; Group IV; Avá-Canoeiro
- Dialects: Tocantins; Araguaia

Language codes
- ISO 639-3: avv
- Glottolog: avac1239
- ELP: Avá
- Linguasphere: 88-AAB-d
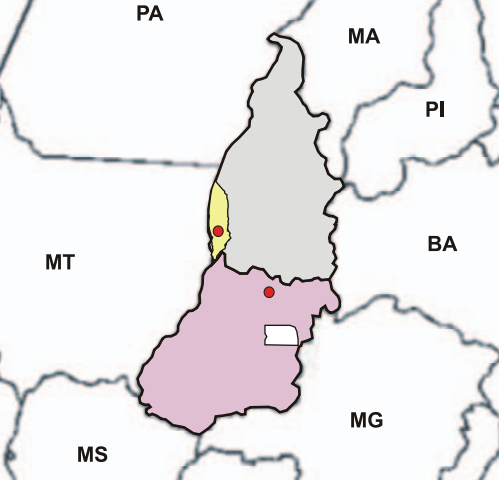
- Historical locations of Tocantins dialect (yellow) and Araguaia dialect (pink)

Avá-Canoeiro, known as Avá or Canoe, is a minor Tupi–Guaraní language of the state of Goiás, in Brazil. It can be further divided into two dialects: Tocantins Avá-Canoeiro and Araguaia Avá-Canoeiro. All speakers of the language are monolingual.

== Phonology ==
The Avá-Canoeiro language has 12 phonemic consonants and 12 phonemic vowels, six of which are oral and six of which are nasal.

=== Vowels ===
The Avá-Canoeiro vowel system is believed to be identical to that of Proto-Tupi-Guarani, with 12 vowels total, including both oral and nasal vowels.

| | Front | | Central | | Back | |
| | oral | nasal | oral | nasal | oral | nasal |
|---|---|---|---|---|---|---|
| Close | i | ĩ | ɨ | ɨ̃ | u | ũ |
| Mid | e | ẽ | (ə) | ə̃ | o | õ |
| Open | (ɛ) | | a | | (ɔ) | |

- /i u/ can be realized as semivowels [j w] after other vowels.

| Phoneme | Allophones | Phoneme | Allophones |
|---|---|---|---|
| /i/ | [i], [ɪ], [j] | /ĩ/ | [ĩ] |
| /e/ | [e], [ɛ], [ɪ] | /ẽ/ | [ẽ] |
| /ɨ/ | [ɨ], [ə] | /ɨ̃/ | [ɨ̃] |
| /a/ | [a], [ə] | /ã/ | [ə̃] |
| /u/ | [u], [ʊ], [w] | /ũ/ | [ũ] |
| /o/ | [o], [ɔ], [ʊ] | /õ/ | [õ] |

=== Consonants ===
The Avá-Canoeiro consonant system has been simplified compared to Proto-Tupi-Guarani due to several sound changes, including the complete loss of the palatalized consonants, the alveolar affricate *ts, the glottal stop *ʔ, and the bilabial fricative *β.

| | Labial | Alveolar | Palatal | Velar | | Uvular |
| | Labial | Alveolar | Palatal | plain | labial | Uvular |
|---|---|---|---|---|---|---|
| Nasal | m | n | | ŋ | | |
| Plosive | p | t | | k | kʷ | |
| Affricate | | | tʃ | | | |
| Fricative | | | | | | ʁ |
| Liquid | | ɾ | j | | w | |

- /ɾ/ may be realized as a tap [ɾ] or as a lateral approximant [l] in free variation.
- /m n/ may be realized as prenasalized [ᵐb ⁿd] or voiced plosives [b d] in free variation; observed only in the Tocantins state variety.

Avá-Canoeiro displays a relatively large degree of allophony. Consonant phonemes may be realized as a variety of non-contrastive phones, given below:

| | | | Labial | Alveolar | Palatal | Velar | | Uvular | |
| | | | Labial | Alveolar | Palatal | plain | labial | plain | labial |
|---|---|---|---|---|---|---|---|---|---|
| Occlusive | voiceless | tenuis | p | t | tʃ | k | kʷ | q | |
| Occlusive | voiceless | aspirated | pʰ | tʰ | | kʰ | | | |
| Occlusive | voiceless | unreleased | p̚ | t̚ | | k̚ | | | |
| Occlusive | voiced | oral | b | d | dʒ | g | | ɢ | ɢʷ |
| Occlusive | voiced | prenasal | ᵐb | ⁿd | | | | | |
| Occlusive | voiced | nasal | m | n | ɲ | ŋ | | | |
| Fricative | voiceless | | | | ʃ | | | | |
| Fricative | voiced | | β | | ʒ | | | ʁ | |
| Liquid | median | oral | | ɾ | j | | w | | |
| Liquid | median | nasal | | ɾ̃ | j̃ | | w̃ | | |
| Liquid | lateral | | | l | ʎ | | | | |

| Phoneme | Allophones |
|---|---|
| /m/ | [m ᵐb b] |
| /n/ | [n ⁿd d] |
| /ŋ/ | [ŋ] |
| /p/ | [p pʰ p̚] |
| /t/ | [t tʰ t̚ tʃ] |
| /k/ | [k kʰ k̚ q] |
| /kʷ/ | [kʷ] |
| /tʃ/ | [tʃ ʃ ʒ j] |
| /ʁ/ | [ʁ ɡ ɢ] |
| /ɾ/ | [ɾ l ɾ̃] |
| /j/ | [j ʃ ʒ tʃ dʒ ʎ ɲ j̃] |
| /w/ | [w β ɢʷ w̃] |

=== Syllable structure and stress ===
The most common syllable structure in Avá-Canoeiro is CV which is found in all positions within words, just like V. CVC and VC can also be found, but they are restricted to the final syllable of a word and considered “marked.” Stress is not phonemic in Avá-Canoeiro, meaning that it is predictable based on the syllable structure of the word. Most words are stressed on the penultimate syllable. There are instances where words are stressed on the final syllable. However, the language has a tendency to transform such words into paroxytones through the process of vowel insertion:

| Stress | Word | Narrow transcription | Translation |
|---|---|---|---|
| paroxitonic | /a.wa.ti/ | [ə.ˈwaː.tʃɪ] | “corn” |
| oxitonic | /ta.kɨ.wɨ.ɾap/ | [tʰə.kɨ.wɨ.ɾaːp] | “behind” |
| paroxitonic after vowel insertion | /ta.kɨ.wɨ.ɾa.p/ | [tʰə.kɨ.wɨ.ɾaː.pə] | “behind” |

== Morphosyntax ==
=== Verbs ===
Avá-Canoeiro uses a combination of prefixes, clitics, and relational morphemes to mark the person of verb subjects and objects. Thus, three series of verbal person markers can be highlighted:

1. Series I marks the subjects of transitive verbs and intransitive active verbs in declarative sentences. These prefixes appear before the verb stem.
2. Series II marks the subjects of all verb types in imperative sentences. Like Series I, these prefixes also appear before the verb stem.
3. Series III marks the objects of transitive verbs and the subjects of intransitive descriptive verbs. These clitics appear after the verb stem.

The third-person pronoun is expressed using the relational prefix i-.

| | | | Series I | Series II | Series III |
|---|---|---|---|---|---|
| sg. | 1st pers. | | a- | — | tʃi= ~ tʃe= |
| sg. | 2nd pers. | | eɾe-/e- | e- | ne= ~ ni= ~ na= |
| pl. | 1st pers. | incl. | jane- | — | jane= |
| pl. | 1st pers. | excl. | oɾo- | — | oɾe= |
| pl. | 2nd pers. | | pe- | pe- | pe= |
| pl. | 3rd pers. | | o- | — | i- |

==== Verb classes ====
Avá-Canoeiro has four subclasses of verbs:

1. transitive, which take two arguments: a subject, and an object;
2. active intransitive, are used to indicate activities and acts of volition and control by the participant in the action. These verbs are marked by person prefixes;
3. descriptive intransitive express concepts related to size, age, value, color, physical property, human propensity, and speed. While these concepts may be considered adjectives semantically, morphologically and syntactically, they do not have distinct properties that distinguish them as a separate class of adjectives. They share characteristics with active intransitive verbs, such as reduplication indicating intensive and iterative aspects, the -pam suffix indicating completive aspect, the circumfix n(a)=...-i(te) for negation, and the causative prefix mo-. As such, the descriptive intransitive verbs can be treated as a subclass of intransitive verbs;
4. the copular verb eko ~ iko is inflected like active intransitive verbs and is marked by personal prefixes. It is related to the deletion of the nuclear case morpheme {-a} in the language.

These subclasses are identified by the number of arguments they take and the pronominal elements they receive. Transitive and intransitive active verbs take Series I personal prefixes to mark their subjects in declarative sentences and Series II personal prefixes in imperative sentences. Intransitive descriptive verbs take Series III pronominal clitics to mark their subjects. In imperative sentences, however, they take the Series II prefixes like the other verb types. Objects of transitive verbs are also marked with Series III pronominal clitics. Unlike other Tupi-Guaraní languages, Avá-Canoeiro does not have portmanteau personal prefixes that mark simultaneous reference to subject and object—here, only one argument is indicated at a time.

==== Moods ====
In Avá-Canoeiro verbs, the following moods have been described:

1. indicative I expresses the simple realization of a verbal process and is considered the unmarked mood for declarative statements;
2. indicative II expresses the realization of a verbal process that is subordinate to a specific circumstance and is often used in subordinate clauses;
3. imperative, used to express commands, requests, and prohibitions. It is characterized by specific prefixes that mark the subject of the verb;
4. gerundive expresses an action that occurred simultaneously with, after, or for the purpose of another action. It often functions similarly to adverbial clauses in other languages.

An object noun can be incorporated into a transitive verb, forming a single phonological word. This has been observed with the verbs eʁuɾ “to bring” and e “to eat.” Notably, the incorporated noun does not take the usual case markers found in noun phrases.

==== Aspects ====
Iterative and intensive aspects, indicating repetition and intensity respectively, are marked using reduplication, which can be either monosyllabic or disyllabic. Monosyllabic reduplication involves repeating the first syllable of the verb root, potentially excluding the final consonant if the root begins with a vowel. Disyllabic reduplication entails repeating the first two syllables of the verb root.

Completive Aspect: To express the completion of an action, Avá-Canoeiro utilizes the suffix {-pam}. This suffix attaches to the main verb of the sentence, irrespective of whether it is transitive or intransitive. The morpheme {-pam} also exists as an independent intransitive active verb meaning “to finish, complete, end, conclude.” This suggests that {-pam} might have originated from a verb and grammaticized into a completive aspect marker in Avá-Canoeiro.

=== Nouns ===
Nouns can be categorized as either relative or absolute. This distinction reflects whether the noun can receive relational inflection, indicating a relationship to something or someone.

Absolute nouns are those that cannot take on relational inflection and represent independent entities. They typically denote: humans (e.g., person, girl, boy); animals and plants (except when talking about a specific referent belonging to someone); elements of nature (e.g., mountain, sky).

Relative nouns, on the other hand, can receive relational inflection, signifying a connection to another entity. Those include: body parts of humans and animals; plant parts; parts of artifacts or tools; feelings, attributes, or qualities.

Nouns in Avá-Canoeiro can be marked for case, including a dedicated argumentative case that obligatorily marks syntactic arguments that are not pronouns or deictic expressions.

==== Cases ====
There are four cases in Avá-Canoeiro: nuclear, locative, translative and unmarked.

The nuclear case in Avá-Canoeiro, indicated by the suffix {-a}, identifies a word as a noun. It is used for the following:

- subjects of both intransitive active and descriptive verbs;
- subjects and objects of transitive verbs;
- complements of the copula eko ~ iko “to be”;
- possessors in possessive constructions;
- objects of postpositions;
- nominal predicates.

The nuclear case in Avá-Canoeiro has two allomorphs, /-a/ and /-∅/. The allomorph /-a/ can occur after both consonants and vowels. However, there are instances where /-∅/ is used instead. This suggests an ongoing linguistic shift in the language. One possible explanation is the lexicalization of the {-a} morpheme, where it becomes an integral part of words. Examples of this phenomenon include aɾaɾa “macaw,” originating from *aɾaɾ+a, and kʷaʁa “hole,” derived from *kʷaɾ+a. This lexicalization of the {-a} suffix is believed to be connected to a shift in stress from the last to the penultimate syllable in words with two or three syllables ending in /ɾ/. This process leads to the {-a} morpheme becoming part of the word's phonological structure. Consequently, the nuclear case is no longer consistently marked by the /-a/ allomorph.

The locative case is marked on nouns using the suffix {-pe}. This suffix signals spatial location. For example, oka-pe “in the house,” comes from oka “house” + -pe. The locative case suffix {-pe} has three allomorphs, dependent on the environment. The allomorphs are:

- [-p], which comes after vowels
- [-pe], which occurs after both vowels and consonants
- [-m], which comes after nasal vowels.

The translative case marks a noun phrase as indicating the state resulting from a process or the complement of a predicate. It is usually formed with the -amo ~ -ramo suffix, but there are instances of -ʁamo and -u also have been observed. Examples include transformations like “the woman turned into a tapir” or to mark complements, as in “my uncle is the chief.”

The unmarked case, indicated by the null suffix {-∅}, occurs in two specific situations:

- citation forms, i.e., when nouns are presented in isolation. This typically happens when providing a word for something in response to a question.
- possessive clauses employ the unmarked case {-∅} on the possessed noun. This distinction helps differentiate the two constructions, as seen in the contrast between tʃi=∅-kɨw-a “my louse” (possessive noun phrase) and tʃi=∅-kɨw-∅ “I have lice” (possessive clause).

=== Adverbs ===
Adverbs encompass a diverse group of words that might belong to other word classes like nouns, postpositions, demonstratives, quantifiers, and descriptive verbs. These words function as adverbs to convey temporal, locative, quantifying, and modal concepts. Some adverbs, however, appear to be independent of other word classes, like amoete (“far”) and upakatu (“all”). Adverbs in Avá-Canoeiro are invariable, independent, and lack specific morphosyntactic features. They are primarily identified by their distributional properties: they exhibit flexibility in their syntactic position, appearing at the beginning or end of sentences, although they usually follow nouns and verbs they modify.

Adverbs can be divided into four classes:

- temporal adverbs, which demote time and frequently appear at the end of sentences;
- locative adverbs, which denote location, typically appear at the end of sentences. Locative concepts can also be expressed using nouns marked with the locative case;
- quantifying adverbs can signify the number of times an action occurs or function as nominal adjuncts expressing the quantity of objects. The position of these adverbs in a sentence determines their function as either adverbs or nominal modifiers.
- modal adverbs. The descriptive verbs katu (“to be good, beautiful”) and puku (“to be long”) can function as modal adverbs, modifying verbs without any specific marking. These adverbs usually follow the verbs they modify, lack person markers, and can be followed by the intensifier particle ete (“really”, “truly”).

== Bibliography ==
- Silva, Ariel Pheula do Couto e (2015). Elementos de fonologia, morfossintaxe e sintaxe da língua Avá-Canoeiro do Tocantins (Dissertação (Mestrado em Linguística)) (in Portuguese). Universidade de Brasília. doi:10.26512/2015.03.D.18519.
- Borges, Mônica Veloso (2006). Aspectos Fonológicos e Morfossintáticos da Língua Avá-Canoeiro (Tupi-Guarani) (PDF) (Tese (Doutorado em Linguística)) (in Portuguese). Universidade Estadual de Campinas. doi:10.47749/T/UNICAMP.2006.370760.
- Silva, Ariel Pheula do Couto e (2018). "Pivô Semântico, Tópico e Foco em Avá-Canoeiro do Tocantins (família Tupí-Guaraní)". Revista Brasileira de Linguística Antropológica (in Portuguese). 9 (1): 163–185. doi:10.26512/rbla.v9i1.19524.
- Silva, Ariel Pheula do Couto e; Cabral, Ana Suelly Arruda Câmara (2016). "Expressão de caso argumentativo em Avá-Canoeiro do Tocantins". Fragmentum (in Portuguese) (46): 215–231. doi:10.5902/fragmentum.v0i46.23397.
- Silva, Ariel Pheula do Couto e (2021). Contribuições para o Conhecimento da História da Língua e da Cultura Avá-Canoeiro (Tese (Doutorado em Linguística)) (in Portuguese). Universidade de Brasília.
- Braggio, Sílvia Lucia Bigonjal (2003). "O papel da pesquisa sociolingüística em projetos de educação, vitalização de língua e cultura: relatos sociolingüísticos iniciais dos Avá-Canoeiro de Minaçu". LIAMES: Línguas Indígenas Americanas (in Portuguese). 3 (1). doi:10.20396/liames.v3i1.1416.
