= Parakanã language =

Tupi-Guarani language

Parakanã
- Native to: Brazil
- Region: Pará
- Ethnicity: Parakanã
- Native speakers: 900 (2004)
- Language family: Tupian: Tupí–Guaraní; Group IV; Akwáwa; Parakanã

Language codes
- ISO 639-3: pak
- Glottolog: para1312
- ELP: Parakanã
- Linguasphere: 88-AAB-ba

Parakanã is a Tupi-Guarani language spoken in the Brazilian state of Pará. The language is classified under the Tenetehara branch or fourth language group of Tupi-Guarani languages as suggested by Rodrigues & Cabral (2012). Parakanã is a dialect of the Akwáwa cluster and is sometimes referred to as Awaeté, Parakanân or Parocana. The Parakanã are the primary speakers of their language. It has been recorded as part of the International Organization for Standardization under the Ethnologue listing pak. Their language has been transcribed and preserved by Christian missionaries for Bible translations.

== Phonology ==
The following is the Parakanã dialect:

=== Vowels ===
	Front	Central	Back
Close	i	ɨ	
Mid	e		o
Open		a	

- Vowel sounds are realized as nasalized when preceding nasal consonants.
- /e/ can also be heard as [ɛ] when in stressed position.
- /ɨ/ can also be heard as [ə] when preceding a vowel.
- /a/ can be heard as back [ʌ] when in word-final position. In its nasal form, it is heard as back [ʌ̃].
- /o/ can be heard as [u] when in unstressed position.

=== Consonants ===
	Labial	Alveolar	Palatal	Velar		Glottal
	Labial	Alveolar	Palatal	plain	lab.	Glottal
Plosive	p	t	tʃ	k	kʷ	ʔ
Fricative	β					h
Nasal	m	n		ŋ		
Tap		ɾ				
Glide					(w)	

- /β/ can also be heard as a glide [w].
- /tʃ/ can be realized as a glide [j] in final position, and as voiced [dʒ] in intervocalic positions.
