= Takunyapé language =

Extinct Tupian language of Brazil

Takunyapé
- Tacunhape
- Region: Brazil
- Ethnicity: Takunyapé
- Extinct: early 1950s
- Language family: Tupian: Tupi–Guarani; Wayampí; Takunyapé

Language codes
- ISO 639-3: None (mis)
- Glottolog: tacu1234
- Linguasphere: 88-AAA-ea

Takunyapé (Tacunhape) is an extinct Tupi–Guaraní language of Brazil.

== Vocabulary ==
The following short vocabularies of Takunyapé were recorded from three settlers in the area, Ernesto Accioly, Teophilo de Castro, and Francisco Pinheiro, who had been in contact with the Takunyapé throughout the end of the 19th century.

gloss	Accioly	Castro	Pinheiro
sun		kuarí	
moon		yaí	
thunder			tupá
rain		amán	
woman	kunyã́		
hammock	kié		
coffee pot	láta kafé maepepá		
fire fan	tapékwá		
oar, rudder	pokuitá		
pot	yapepó		
spirit	koeṅgá	kaĭaṅgę́d	
wine		kaĭaṅgę́d muntpię̃	
sugar	arapet	iambapéd	
manioc flour		uús	
house		iká	
money		marapé	
shirt			kamitsá
trousers			tsirét
shotgun		mukáę	
tapir	tapií	tapíę	
wild boar	tažuž		
howler monkey	akikí		
chicken	ierapayá	arapayá	
egg			psem
black vulture	iriví		
trahira		tairí	
rice	awačií		
tobacco		petimã́	
let's go!	eré katú		
let's go to the Ambé!	ehé Ambé erupap		
of the mornings	koemirĩ		
light a fire	mendí tatá		
to row	pokuí		
I want to eat tracajá eggs			trakuyá psem gro̲
