= Akwáwa language =

Tupi–Guarani dialect group of Brazil

Akwáwa
- Native to: Brazil
- Region: Pará
- Ethnicity: Suruí do Pará, Asuriní, Parakanã
- Native speakers: 1,500 (2012)
- Language family: Tupian: Tupí–Guaraní; Group IV; Akwáwa
- Dialects: Suruí; Asuriní; Parakanã

Language codes
- ISO 639-3: Variously: asu – Asuriní mdz – Suruí pak – Parakanã
- Glottolog: tupi1284
- Linguasphere: 88-AAB-b
- Akwáwa is classified as Vulnerable by the UNESCO Atlas of the World's Languages in Danger.

Akwáwa is a Tupi–Guarani dialect cluster spoken in Pará in western Brazil.

== Dialects ==
There are three distinct dialects:

- Asuriní (of Tocantins or Trocará), or Akwawa
- Suruí (of Tocantins or Pará), or Akewara
- Parakanã, Awaeté

Both the name Asuriní and Suruí are used for related peoples and their languages: Suruí of Jiparaná, Suruí of Rondônia, Asuriní of Xingú, etc.

== Phonology ==
The following is the Asuriní dialect:

=== Vowels ===
	Front	Central	Back
Close	i	ɨ	
Mid	ɛ		o
Open		a	

- Vowel length is also distinctive.
- Vowel sounds are realized as nasalized when preceding nasal consonants.

=== Consonants ===
	Labial	Alveolar	Palatal	Velar		Glottal
	Labial	Alveolar	Palatal	plain	lab.	Glottal
Plosive	p	t	tʃ	k	kʷ	ʔ
Fricative						h
Nasal	m	n		ŋ		
Tap		ɾ				
Approximant					w	
