= Anambé language =

Endangered Tupian language of Brazil

Anambé
- Native to: Brazil
- Region: Pará, Cairari River
- Ethnicity: 130 Anambé (2000)
- Native speakers: 6 (2006)
- Language family: Tupian: Tupi–Guaraní; Xingu; Anambé

Language codes
- ISO 639-3: aan
- Glottolog: anam1249
- ELP: Anambé of Cairarí
- Linguasphere: 88-AAE-bb
- Anambé is classified as Critically Endangered by the UNESCO Atlas of the World's Languages in Danger.

Anambé, or more specifically Anambe of Cairari, is a possibly extinct Tupi language spoken in Pará, on the Cairari River in Brazil. It is being supplanted by Portuguese.
