= Xingu Asurini language =

Tupi–Guaraní language of Brazil

Xingú Asuriní
- Asurini of Xingu
- Awaeté
- Pronunciation: [a.wa.e.'te]
- Native to: Brazil
- Region: Pará
- Native speakers: 120 (2006)
- Language family: Tupian: Tupi–Guarani; Xingu; Xingú Asuriní

Language codes
- ISO 639-3: asn
- Glottolog: xing1248
- ELP: Asuriní of Xingú
- Linguasphere: 88-AAE-ba
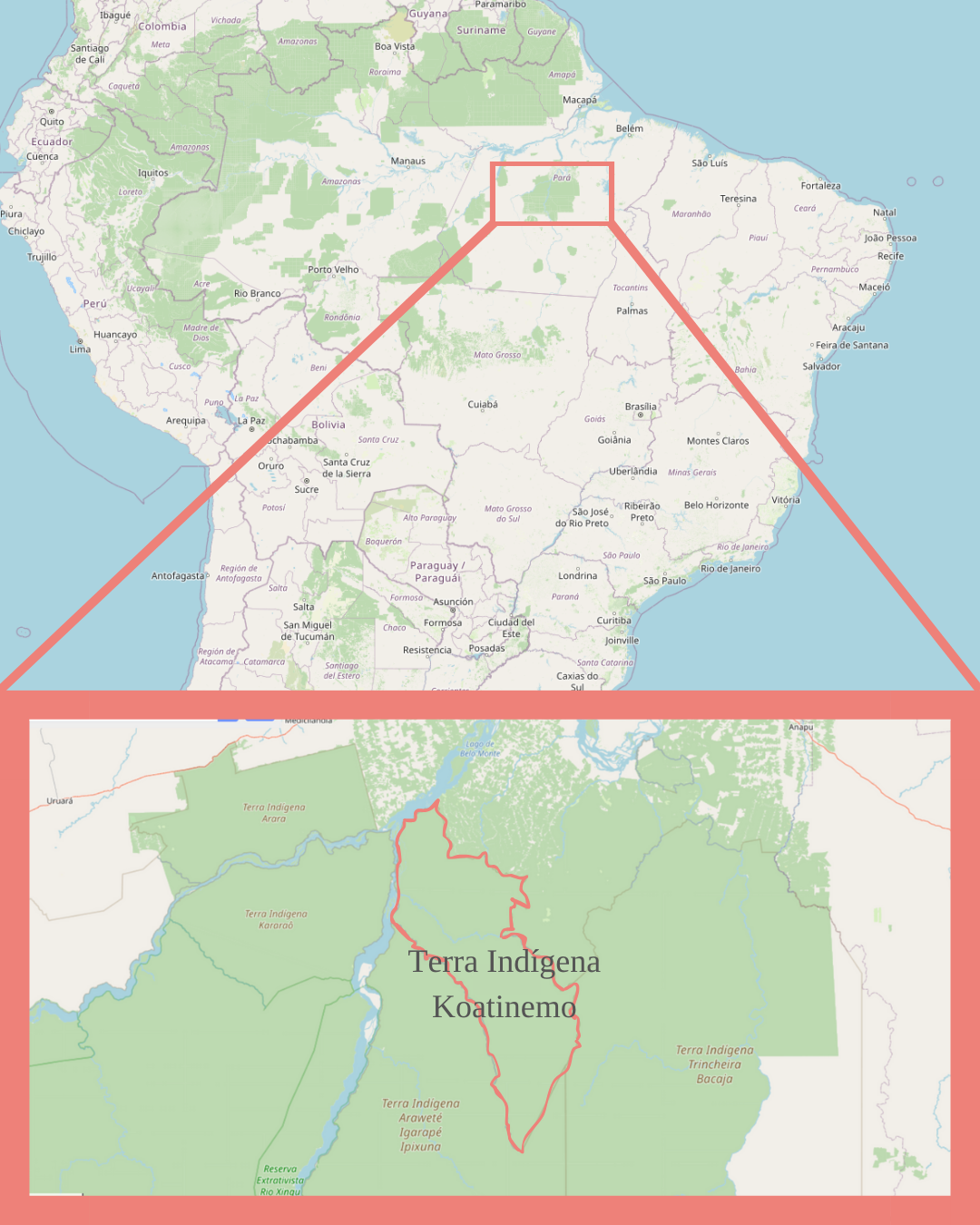

- Asurini do Xingu is classified as Vulnerable by the UNESCO Atlas of the World's Languages in Danger.

Xingú Asuriní (Asurini of Xingu) is a Tupi–Guaraní language of the state of Pará, in the Amazon region of Brazil. The entire population speaks the language, and most speakers are monolingual.

== Phonology ==
=== Consonants ===
		Bilabial	Alveolar	Postalveolar	Palatal	Velar	Glottal
Occlusive	voiceless	p	t			k	ʔ
Occlusive	aspirated	pʰ	tʰ			kʰ	
Occlusive	voiced	b	d			g	
Occlusive	labialized					kʷ	
Nasal		m	n		ɲ	ŋ	
Pre-nasal		ᵐb	ⁿd			ᵑg	
Fricative	voiceless	ɸ		ʃ			h
Fricative	voiced	β		ʒ			
Affricate	voiceless			t͡ʃ			
Affricate	voiced			d͡ʒ			
Tap			ɾ				
Approximant		w			j		

=== Vowels ===
	Plain			Nasal		
	Front	Central	Back	Front	Central	Back
Close	i	ɨ	u	ĩ	ɨ̃	ũ
Close-mid	e			ẽ		
Open	a			ã		
