= Guajá language =

Tupi–Guarani language spoken in Brazil

Guajá
- Awá
- Native to: Brazil
- Region: Maranhão
- Ethnicity: Awá-Guajá
- Native speakers: 335 (2023)
- Language family: Tupian: Tupi–Guaraní; Wayampí; Guajá
- Dialects: Anambé of Ehrenreich †

Language codes
- ISO 639-3: gvj
- Glottolog: guaj1256
- ELP: Guajá
- Linguasphere: 88-AAA-fa

Guajá, or Awá (also Ayaya, Guaxare, Wazaizara), is a geographically isolated Tupi–Guarani language spoken in Brazil. The extinct 'Anambé' recorded by Ehrenreich may have been a distinct language.
