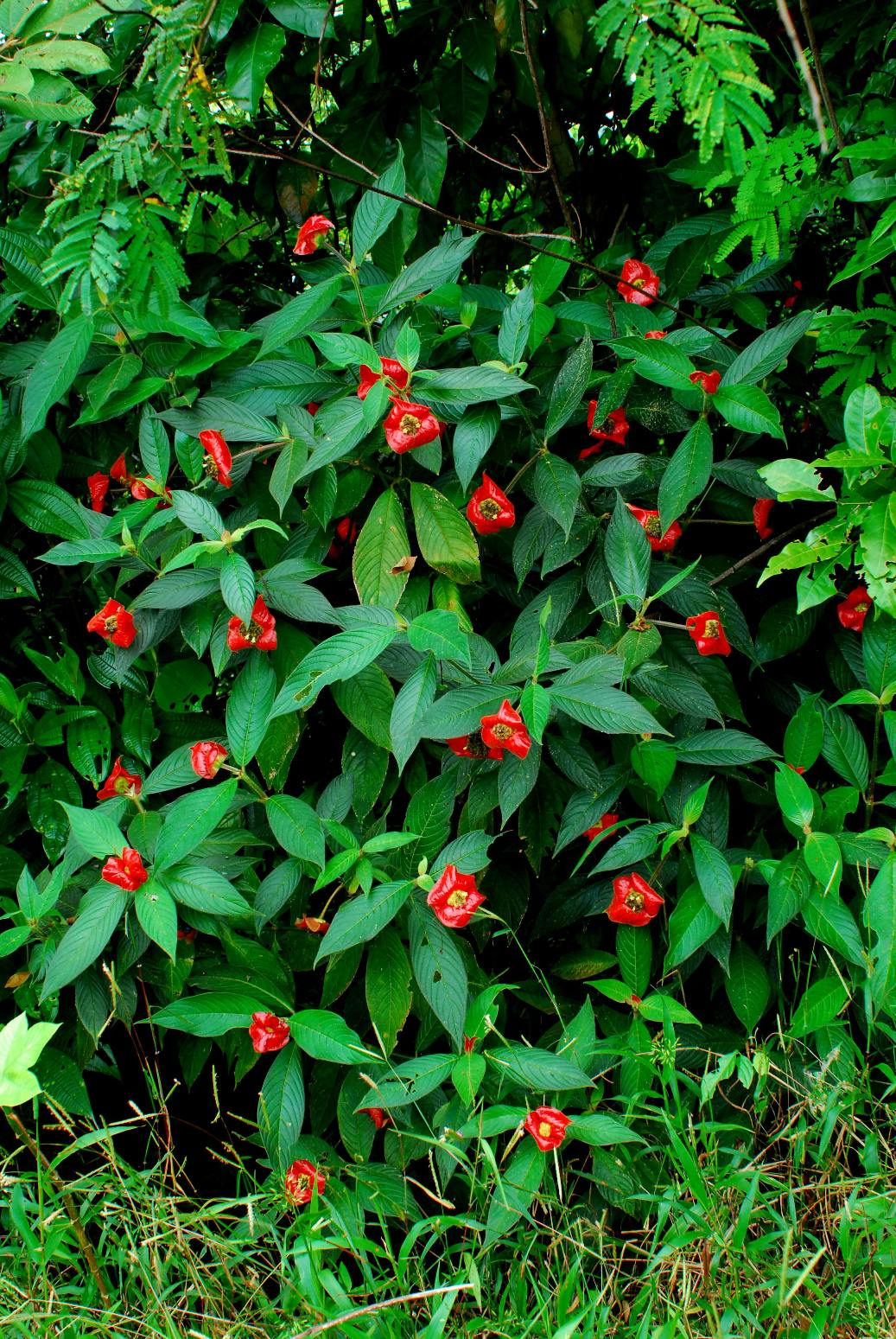
- Flowering plant

Scientific classification
- Kingdom: Plantae
- Clade: Embryophytes
- Clade: Tracheophytes
- Clade: Angiosperms
- Clade: Eudicots
- Clade: Asterids
- Order: Gentianales
- Family: Rubiaceae
- Genus: Palicourea
- Species: P. tomentosa

Binomial name
- Palicourea tomentosa (Aubl.) Borhidi

Synonyms
- Many, see text

= Palicourea tomentosa =

Species of plant

Palicourea tomentosa, many synonyms, including Psychotria poeppigiana, is a plant species in the family Rubiaceae. A common name is sore-mouth bush, though it is not very often used.

It ranges widely in the tropical Americas, from Chiapas, Oaxaca, Tabasco and Veracruz in Mexico to the very north of Argentina. It does not occur on the Pacific side of the American Cordillera however, and is thus absent from El Salvador and Chile. It is probably also absent from Uruguay and Paraguay.

Palicourea tomentosa is a large shrub. The inflorescences are carried upright or semi-erect and are surrounded by large bracts, colored a conspicuous red, that attract pollinators. The flowers themselves are inconspicuous, with the small yellow petals and sepals forming a narrow corollar tube. Pollinators are mainly hummingbirds, namely small hermit (Phaethornithinae) species like the black-throated hermit (Phaethornis atrimentalis), straight-billed hermit (P. bourcieri) and reddish hermit (P. ruber). They do not insert their bills deeply into the small flowers, and thus the pollinators of the sore-mouth bush include curved- and straight-billed species alike.

== Taxonomy and names ==
This widespread plant has been described under a variety of names, today all considered synonym:

- Callicocca tomentosa (Aubl.) J.F.Gmel.
- Cephaelis hirsuta M.Martens & Galeotti
- Cephaelis tomentosa (Aubl.) Vahl
- Cephaelis vultusmimi Dwyer
- Evea tomentosa (Aubl.) Standl.
- Psychotria hirsuta (M.Martens & Galeotti) Müll. Arg. ex Mart.
- Tapogomea tomentosa Aubl.
- Uragoga poeppigiana (Müll. Arg.) Kuntze
- Uragoga tomentosa (Aubl.) K.Schum.

In 2011, Hungarian botanist Attila Borhidi published reclassification of Mexican Psychotria species, transferring Psychotria poeppigiana into Palicourea tomentosa based on Tapogomea tomentosa. This reclassification has been accepted by Kew.

Local names include:

- Carib languages:
  - Guiana Carib: yo-nu-ne-mah (Akuriyó), ku-ri-lu eh-nah-pe-da (Tiriyó)
  - North Amazonian Carib: kaia-eno-mio (Akawaio)
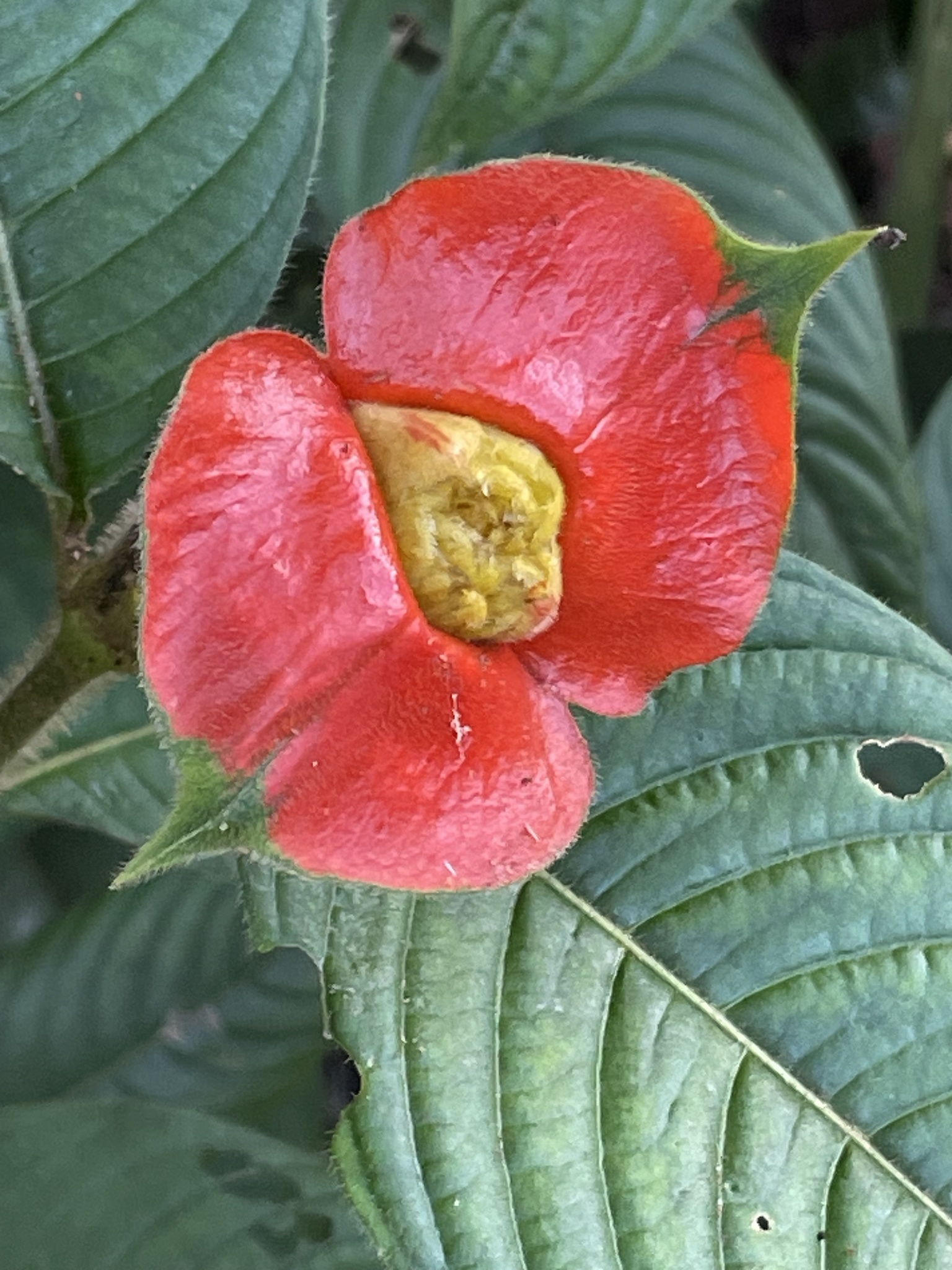
    Colombia
  - Central Carib: pe-yah-o-tih-puh (Wayana)
- Creole languages: radie zore (French Guiana Creole), soldier's cap (Guyanese Creole)
- Tupí–Guaraní languages: tapi'i-kanami (Ka'apor), meaning "tapir-kanami". Kanami is the Ka'apor term for poison used in fishing prepared from Clibadium. The name references both plant's (real or presumed) property of making animals more accessible to hunters (see below).

== Use by humans ==
The Ka'apor people of Maranhão (Brazil) use its flowers as a "hunting fetish", a magical talisman to facilitate hunting. As the Tulane University anthropologist and historical ecologist William Balée describes it,

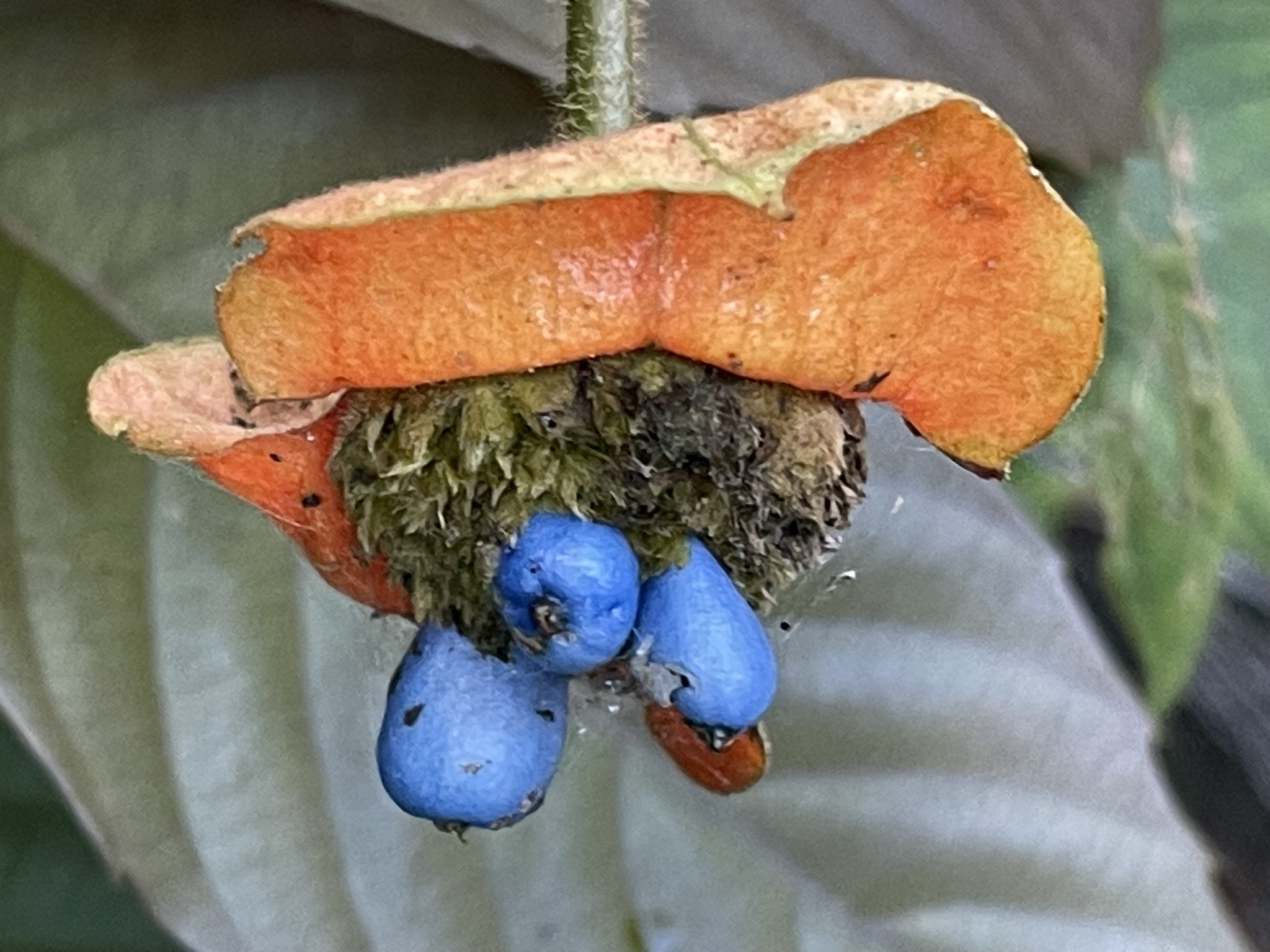
Fruit, Columbia

"... flowers of Psychotria poeppigiana [...] are wrapped in a piece of cloth and affixed to a dog's collar so that it may more easily find the enormous, highly desirable, and decidedly uncommon tapir"

Palicourea tomentosa has several uses in folk medicine; it is widely used as a painkiller besides having some more specialized applications. The Tiriyó of Suriname crush and boil the plant and use the resulting decoction to treat headaches, sprains, rheumatism, muscular pains and bruises. The Wayana, also of Surinam, grind the bark and apply it raw to a particular rash known to them as poispoisi. The bracts are crushed to release the sap, which is then applied into the ear canal to relieve earaches. The decoction from the inflorescence, boiled whole, is credited with antitussive qualities and used as a whooping cough remedy and more generally to treat respiratory tract infections, as are decoctions of the leaves of ssp. barcellana.

It also contains dimethyltryptamine, though as suggested by the use native peoples make of it probably not in quantities to render it strongly psychedelic.

== See also ==
- Psychedelic plants
