= Kaʼapor (disambiguation) =

The Kaʼapor are an indigenous people of Brazil.

Kaʼapor may also refer to:

- Kaʼapor language
- Kaʼapor Sign Language

== See also ==
- Kaapori capuchin
