= Tremembé people =

Indigenous people in Brazil

Tremembé Teremembé
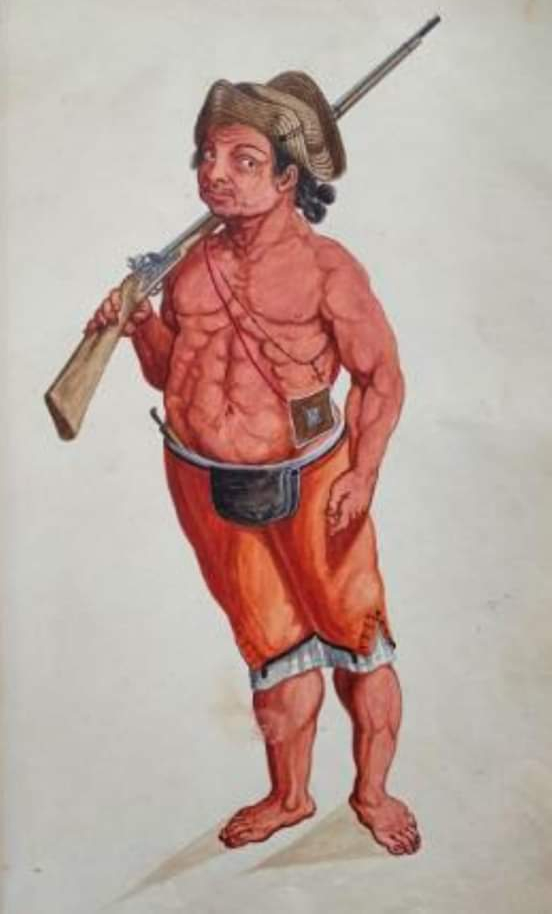

Total population
- 3,662 (2014)

Regions with significant populations
- Brazil (Ceará, Maranhão)

Languages
- Tremembé (unattested and extinct), Brazilian Portuguese, Tupi

Religion
- Traditional tribal religion

The Tremembé or Teremembé people are an Indigenous people in the states of Ceará and Maranhão in Brazil. In 2020, there were 3,837 of them.

== Settlement area ==
Existing members of this ethnicity are centered in the Almofala district of the municipality of Itarema, and a few more in the neighboring municipalities of Acaraú and Itapipoca, on the Atlantic coast of Ceará, some 150 km north of the state capital of Fortaleza. CEDI (1990) estimates that the Tremembé were 3,060 until 1986, but a more recent estimate places their numbers at merely 1,175. The Tremembé people live in tipis.

== History ==
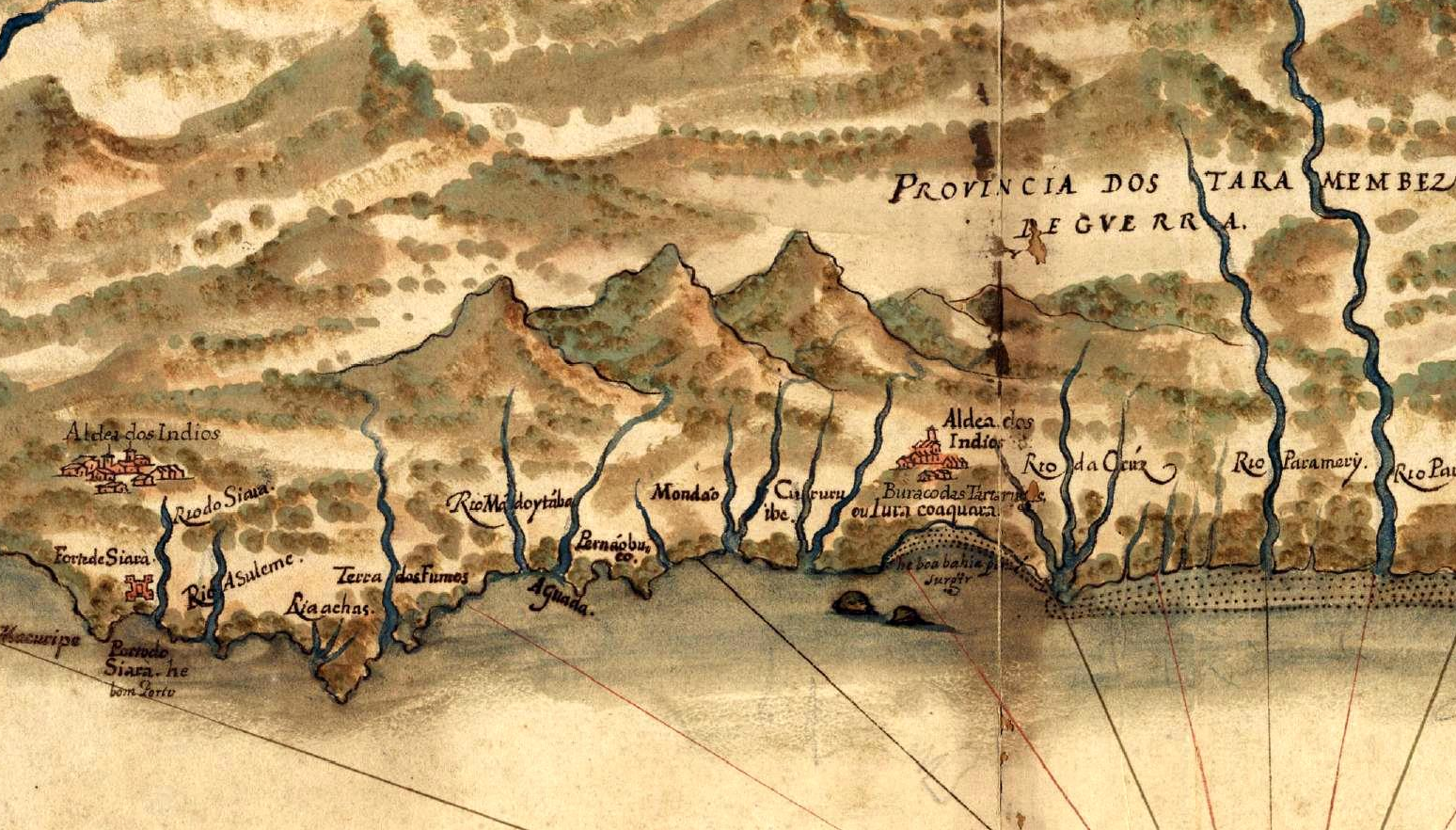
1629 map of Ceará coast, highlighting the dominions of the Tremembé

The Tremembé were one of the few Tapuia ("non-Tupi people") that lived on the Brazilian coast on the advent of European contact c. 1500. The Tremembé ranged over a large coastal area ranging across the modern states of Pará, Maranhão, Piauí and Ceará. The ethnohistorical map of Nimuendajú situates the traditional territory of the Tremembé in two segments along the northern Atlantic coast of Brazil. The first segment stretched some 160 km from the bay of the Caeté River (by modern Bragança, Pará) to the bay of Turiaçu (Maranhão). The second and principal segment stretched some 500 km, from the environs of São Luís, Maranhão as far as the region of Fortaleza. The small interruption between the two stretches was occupied by a Tupinambá tribe. The Tremembé population are estimated to have once numbered 20,000.

The Tremembé, a Tapuia tribe, were virtually surrounded by Tupi peoples - on the coast, there were Tupinambá to the west, and the Potiguara and Tabajara to the east. In their hinterlands were other Tupi ethnicities, like the Guajá, the Urubú, and the Guajajara.

In the 17th century, the Tremembé began to settle in the Jesuit mission of Aracati-mirím, at Aldeia do Cajueiro (now Almofala) by the Acaraú River in Ceará. There was also a (non-Jesuit) mission at Tutóia (in Maranhão). When the Portuguese minister, the Marquis of Pombal, issued his 1759 decrees expelling the Jesuits and dismantling their missions, the settled Tremembé population moved, along with a handful of priests, to Vila Nova do Soure (Caucaia). However, they did not adapt well to their new environment, and were allowed to return to their old mission settlement, the Aldeia do Cajueiro, which was renamed Almofala and incorporated as an Indian town in 1766.

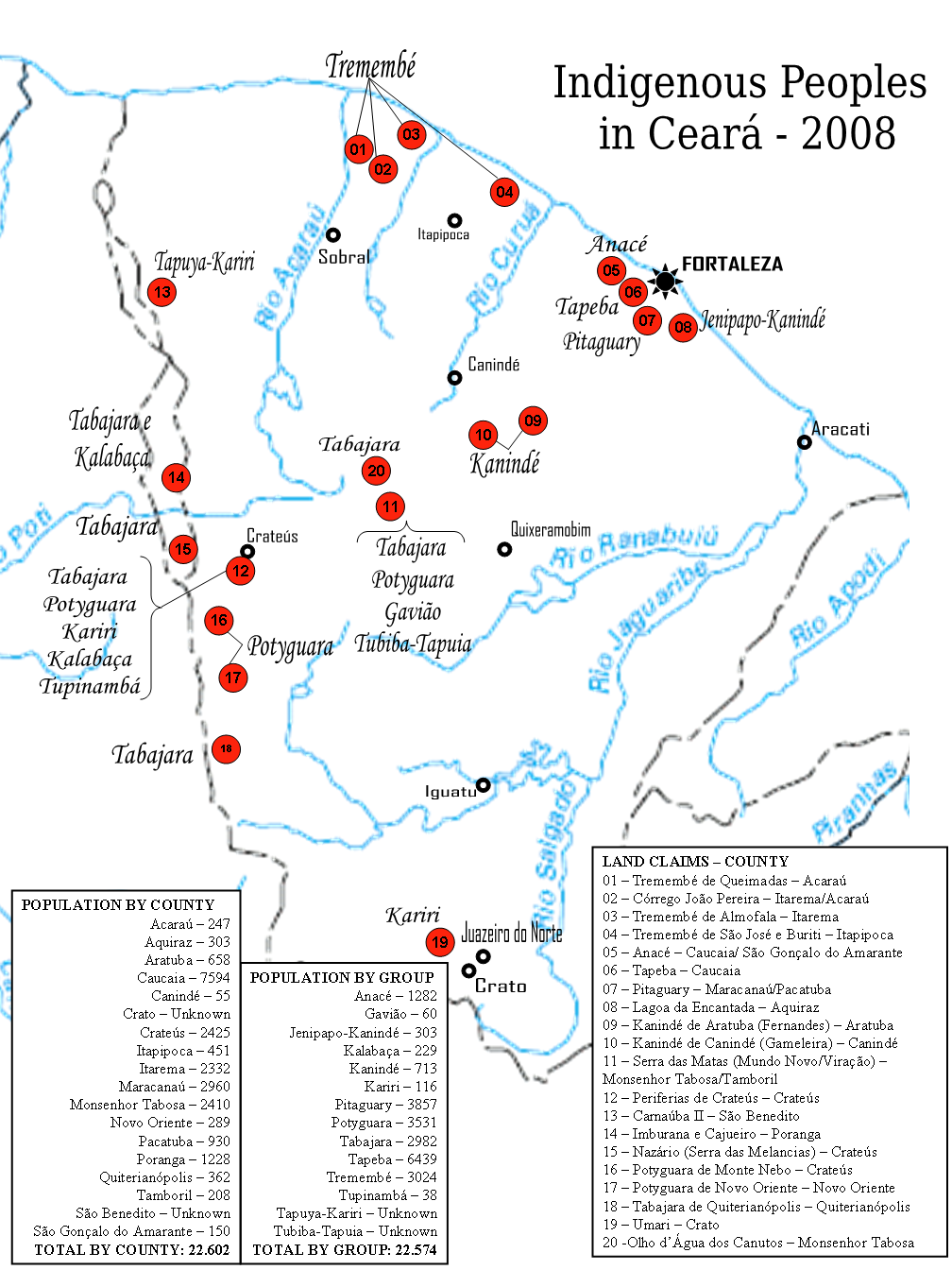
Indigenous peoples of Ceará, 2008

The Tremembé were dispossessed of most of their remaining lands in the aftermath of the 1854 "Lei da Terra" (land tenure decree) of the Empire of Brazil. The state governor of Ceará issued a decree in 1863 declaring the Tremembé an extinct people, remaining Indians officially regarded as caboclos (mixed-race) or "descendants" of Indians, but not an existing ethnicity. Nonetheless, the Tremembé resurged and received recognition from the Fundação Nacional do Índio in the 1980s.

== Culture ==
The Tremembé were known for their manufacture of crescent-shaped axes, also called "anchor axes", which were produced the first night of a crescent moon and can be found scattered along Eastern Brazil. They shared these axes with the Canela people. They believed that with these axes, they were invincible in battle.

== Language ==
The original language of the Tremembé is extinct and entirely unknown. Current members of the ethnicity speak Portuguese as their mother tongue. The language is unclassified, but generally believed to have not been part of the Tupi–Guarani family (thus, "Tapuia", or non-Tupi). Nonetheless, the Tremembé may have borrowed a considerable number of Tupi words through interaction with their Tupi neighbors.

== Notable Tremembé ==
- Kunã Yporã Tremembé, Vice-Presidential Candidate for the Unified Workers' Socialist Party of Brazil during the 2022 Brazilian Election
