= Tenetehara =

Tenetehara may refer to:

- Tenetehara people, an ethnic group of Brazil
- Tenetehara language, a language of Brazil
  - Tenetehara languages, a group of languages
