= William Balée =

American anthropologist (born 1954)

William Balée (born 1954) is a professor of anthropology at Tulane University in New Orleans, Louisiana.

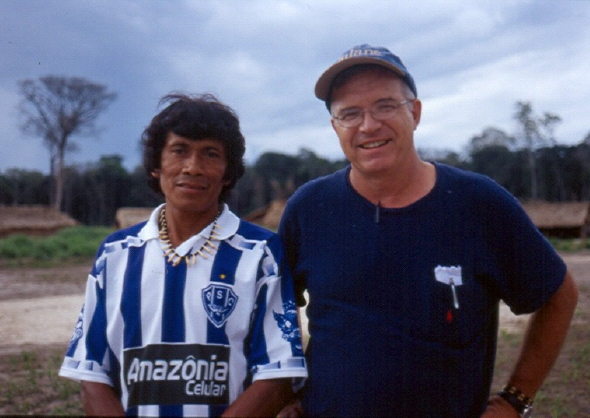
(R) William Balée, Anthropology professor at Tulane University, with (L) indigenous consultant on landscape transformation in Brazil

== About ==
Balée was born in Fort Lauderdale, Florida and educated at the University of Florida, Gainesville, where he received a B.A. in Anthropology before moving on to Columbia University in New York City where he earned a Ph.D. in Anthropology (1984).

== Career ==
His primary ethnographic work was with the Ka'apor indigenous people of Maranhão, Brazil (Balée 1994). He also carried out fieldwork with the Tembé, the Assurini of the Xingu River, the Araweté of the Ipix (tributary of the Xingu), and the Guajá of Maranhão (Balée 2013, 2023).

He is well-known as one of the founders of and experts in historical ecology (Balée 1998). Balée has proposed four interdependent postulates, which set historical ecology apart from other more traditional research programs. Basically summarized, these postulates are: (1) Humans have affected nearly all environments on Earth; (2) Humans do not have an innate propensity to decrease biotic and landscape diversity or to increase it; (3) Various types of societies impact their landscapes in dissimilar ways; (4) Human interactions with landscapes can be comprehended holistically (Balée 2006).

=== Awards and Recognition ===
Dr. Balée has won the Mary W. Klinger Book Award from the Society for Economic Botany for two of his books, in 1996 (Footprints of the Forest) and 2014 (Cultural Forests of the Amazon). He was appointed Officer of the Order of the Golden Ark, a Dutch conservation merit order, by Prince Bernhard in 1993. In 2016 he received the President’s Award for Excellence in Graduate and Professional Teaching from Tulane University. He is a 2019 Guggenheim Fellow. Balée is the 2023 recipient of the Distinguished Ethnobiologist Award from the Society of Ethnobiology.

== See also ==
- Carl O. Sauer (geographer)

== Sources ==
- Balée, William. 2023. Sowing the Forest. Tuscaloosa: University of Alabama Press.
- Balee William. 2016. Inside Cultures. Second Edition. New York and London: Routledge.
- Balée, William. 2013. Cultural Forests of the Amazon: A Historical Ecology of People and their Landscapes. Tuscaloosa: University of Alabama Press.
- Balée, William. 2012 Inside Cultures: A New Introduction to Cultural Anthropology. Walnut Creek, CA: Left Coast Press.
- Balée, William. 2006. The Research Program of Historical Ecology. Annual Review of Anthropology 35(1):75-98.
- Balée, William. (editor). 1998. Advances in Historical Ecology. Historical Ecology Series, New York: Columbia University Press.
- Balée, William. 1994 Footprints of the Forest. New York: Columbia University Press.
- Balée, William. (editor). 1989. Nomenclatural patterns in Ka'apor ethnobotany (Journal of Ethnobiology).
