= UKS =

UKS or uks may refer to:

- UKS, the IATA code for Sevastopol International Airport, Belbek, Crimea
- uks, the ISO 639-3 code for Ka'apor Sign Language, Maranhão, Brazil
- Umayalpuram K. Sivaraman, Indian mridangam player
- Unbreakable Kimmy Schmidt, Netflix comedy show
