= Kaʼapor language =

Tupian language spoken in Brazil

Kaʼapor
- Urubu
- Native to: Brazil
- Region: Maranhão
- Ethnicity: 990 Kaapor (2006)
- Native speakers: 800 (2006)
- Language family: Tupian: Tupi–Guaraní; Wayampí; Kaʼapor
- Writing system: Latin script
- Signed forms: Kaʼapor Sign Language

Language codes
- ISO 639-3: urb
- Glottolog: urub1250
- ELP: Kaapor
- Linguasphere: 88-AAA-d

Kaapor (Kaʼapor, Kaaporté), also known as "Urubú," "Caapor" or Urubú-Kaapor, is a Tupi–Guarani language spoken as a primary language by the Kaʼapor people of Brazil. The language is also spoken as a second language by non-Ka'apor ethnic groups, including Tembé.

There is a high incidence of congenital deafness among the Kaʼapor people, most of whom grow up bilingual in Urubu-Kaapor Sign Language, which may be indigenous to them.

== Phonology ==
=== Consonants ===
	Labial	Alveolar	Palatal	Velar		Glottal
	Labial	Alveolar	Palatal	plain	labial	Glottal
Nasal	m	n		ŋ	ŋʷ	
Plosive	p	t		k	kʷ	ʔ
Fricative		s	ʃ			h
Approximant			j		w	
Tap		ɾ				

- /s ʃ/ may be realized as affricates [ts tʃ] word-initially.
- /m n/ may be realized as prenasalized plosives [ᵐb ⁿd] word-initially.
- /j/ may be realized as a voiced fricative [ʒ] or affricate [dʒ] in free variation word-initially.
- /ɾ/ may be realized as a trill [r] word-finally.

=== Vowels ===
	Front		Central		Back	
	oral	nasal	oral	nasal	oral	nasal
Close	i	ĩ	ɨ		u	ũ
Mid	e	ẽ			o	õ
Open			a	ã		

- /e o/ may also be heard as open-mid [ɛ ɔ] in stressed syllables.
