= Tremembé language =

Extinct language of Brazil

Tremembé
- Teremembé
- Native to: Brazil
- Region: Ceará
- Ethnicity: Tremembé people
- Extinct: early 19th century
- Language family: unclassified

Language codes
- ISO 639-3: tme
- Glottolog: trem1235
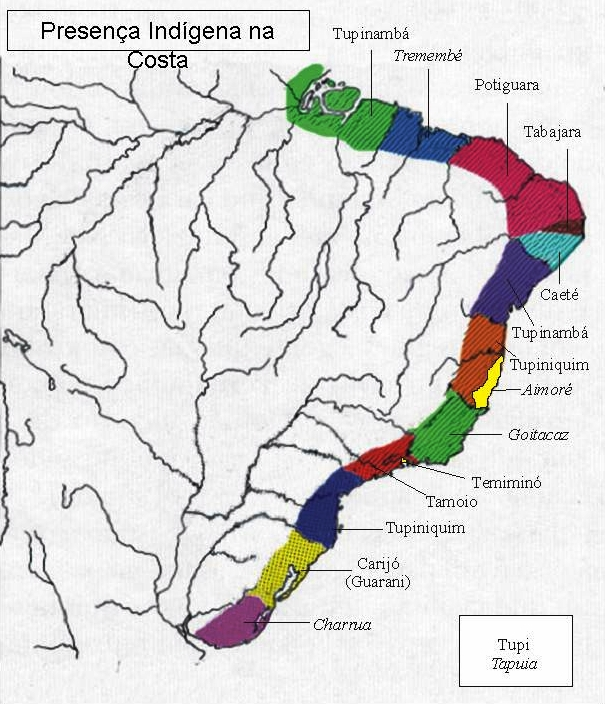
- Tremembé

Tremembé, Teremembé or Taramembe is an extinct language of Brazil. It was originally spoken by the Tremembé people, who once inhabited the northern Brazilian coasts from Pará to Ceará. The Tremembé were described as a "Tapuia" tribe - that is, not one of the dominant Tupi–Guarani peoples of the coasts. It was thought "very likely" to belong to the Macro-Jê languages by John Alden Mason. Only a few personal names of this language were recorded before it became extinct in the early 19th century.
