= Guajajara =

Indigenous people in the Brazilian state of Maranhão

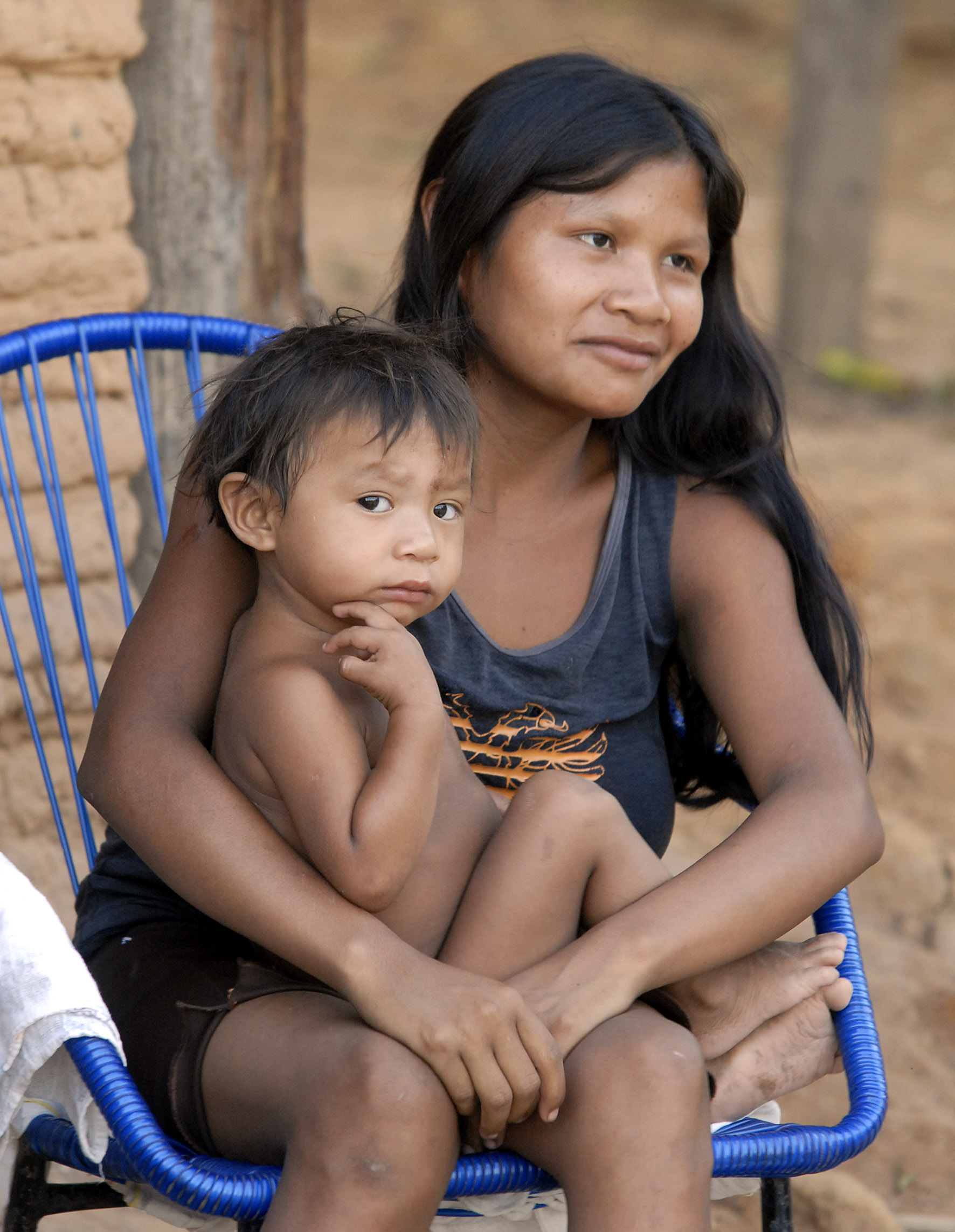
- Guajajara woman holding a young child

Total population
- 19,471 (2006)

Regions with significant populations
- Brazil (Maranhão)

Languages
- Guajajara (a Tupi–Guarani language)

Religion
- traditional tribal religion

Related ethnic groups
- Tembé

The Guajajara are an Indigenous people in the Brazilian state of Maranhão. They are one of the most numerous Indigenous groups in Brazil, with an estimated 13,100 individuals living on Indigenous land.

== History ==
In 1901, the Guajajara fought Capuchin missionaries in what is regarded as the last Brazilian "war against the Indians." Chief Cauiré Imana had succeeded in uniting many villages to destroy the Capuchin mission and expel all whites from the region between the cities of Barra do Corda and Grajaú. The Guajajara were defeated by a militia made up of army contingents, military police, and Canelas warriors.

== Guardians of the forest ==
The "guardians of the forest" are a forest protection group primarily composed of Guajajara tribal members living on Arariboia Indigenous Land, a territory in the north-eastern edge of the Amazon rainforest in Maranhão, Brazil. They operate with the intent of protecting the rainforest from invasion by loggers, land grabbers, and drug traffickers. Although the group was officially founded in 2013, the Arariboia Guajajara argue that their mission of guarding the rainforest has been in action for more than five centuries.

=== Origin and mission ===
On October 15, 2007, tribal leader Tome Guajajara was killed during an armed invasion by woodcutters in his village, after which talks of formalizing the group began. Village leaders in nearby communities encouraged young people to mobilize to defend their land. In 2013, the Guardians of the Forest was established. They are politically independent, volunteer-run, and there is no official record of their existence to protect their members from being targeted. The Guardians track illegal loggers, miners, and their camps in groups of five or more, by foot or using motorized vehicles to disrupt and deter deforestation.

The Guardians consist of approximately 120 volunteers who collectively protect 413,000 hectares of land in Arariboia. The territory is inhabited by 13,100 members of the Guajajara, Awa-Guaja, and Awá Indigenous tribes. A large portion of the Awá tribe are uncontacted and are dependent on the rainforest for subsistence and survival. Loggers and extraction teams negatively impact the ecological longevity and spiritual value of the land, undermining Indigenous peoples' safety and way of life. The Guajajara adopt an Indigenous approach to environmental justice, in which they emphasize a reciprocal relationship between humans and the environment. From their perspective, humans have a responsibility to give back to the environment what they take. The Guardians consider themselves stewards of the forest, emphasizing kinship and their ancestral obligation to protect their land.

=== Response ===
==== Political response ====
The Brazilian government has been a prominent adversary to the Guardians, particularly under the presidency of Jair Bolsonaro. Bolsonaro has publicly dismissed the Indigenous people's claim to the Arariboia land throughout his political career. The conflict is furthered by the interests of multinational corporations that aim to maximize profits from cheap commodities retrieved through forest extraction. Bolsonaro, who was elected on a platform heavily supported by the agricultural business sector, sided with the multinational corporations. The Guardians have accused Bolsonaro of weakening their constitutional rights through his support for deforestation over the needs of Indigenous communities. Although the 1988 Brazilian Constitution grants land rights to Indigenous groups, they have been consistently excluded from the procedural process of environmental discussions. The capabilities of Indigenous people to achieve cultural, spiritual, and physical wellbeing is ignored through the generalization of human environmental needs. According to the Guardians, the lack of recognition of their injustice was a motivating factor for the creation of their group.

==== International response ====
The Guardians have attracted growing international attention due to their opposition to the government and the high-profile murders of several members. In November 2019, Sônia Guajajara, a prominent Indigenous activist and former presidential candidate who ran against Bolsonaro in 2018, urged the European Union to place global pressure on Brazil for their repression of Indigenous environmental rights. Organizations including Greenpeace, Democracy Now!, and major news outlets, including The Atlantic, Vox Media, and the BBC have raised awareness of the group's activities, with Indigenous activists increasingly advocating for sanctions against the Brazilian government and the need for Indigenous visibility in environmental justice forums.

=== Conflict ===
Between 2000 and 2020, 47 Guardians were killed during confrontations with illegal loggers, miners, and extractions teams. Violence escalated following Bolsonaro's election in 2018, leading to the death of multiple members, including Paulo Paulino Guajajara and schoolteacher Zezico Guajajara. Guardians are eligible to enrol in a federally implemented Human Rights Defenders Protection Program, which claims to provide physical and financial security to vulnerable community members. However, it has been criticized by Guajajara members for its criminalization of protestors and its failure to punish and hold illegal loggers and miners accountable.
