= Tenetehara language =

Tupian language spoken by indigenous peoples in the Brazilian state of Maranhão

Tenetehára
- Guajajara
- Native to: Brazil
- Region: Maranhão
- Ethnicity: 19,500 Guajajara (2006), 820 Tembé (1999), 60 Turiwara (1998)
- Native speakers: 13,000 (2006)
- Language family: Tupian: Tupí–Guaraní; Group IV; Tenetehára
- Dialects: Guajajara; Tembé

Language codes
- ISO 639-3: Either: gub – Guajajara tqb – Tembé
- Glottolog: temb1276
- Linguasphere: 88-AAB-a

Tenetehára is a Tupi–Guarani language spoken in the state of Maranhão in Brazil. Sociolinguistically, it is two languages, each spoken by the Guajajara and the Tembé people, though these are mutually intelligible. Tembé was spoken by less than a quarter of its ethnic population of 820 in 2000; Guajajara, on the other hand, is more robust, being spoken by two-thirds of its 20,000 people.

== History ==
Tenetehára speakers were first contacted in 1615 by a French expedition in the margins of the Pindaré river. They clashed against slaver raids until Jesuit missions were set up among them (1653-1755). After the Jesuits were expelled from Brazil, the various Tenetehára groups went back to a life with very limited contact with the settler society.

At the end of the 19th century the members of the community started to be employed as collectors of natural resources. After some abuse by white settlers in their vicinity, in 1901 the Guajajara group revolted against a nearby Capuchin missions and expelled them from their land. They have been in continuous conflict with clandestine loggers and illegal settlements in their land.

== Phonology ==
Tenetehára has a total of 21 phonemes: 14 consonants and 7 vowels. Each of the consonantal phonemes occurs as the initial C in CV and CVC syllables, while each of the vowels occurs as the nucleus in the four syllable patterns.

Any phoneme of the class /m n ŋ t k z w r/ may occur in the syllable and word final C position, while /ŋʷ p kʷ ʔ s h/ are limited in their distribution in that they do not occur in the final C position. Similarly, /ŋ ŋʷ/ have a somewhat limited distribution in that they never occur word-initially.

Consonants
		Bilabial	Alveolar	Velar		Glottal
		Bilabial	Alveolar	plain	labial	Glottal
Nasal		m ⟨m⟩	n ⟨n⟩	ŋ ⟨g⟩	ŋʷ ⟨gw⟩	
Plosive		p ⟨p⟩	t ⟨t⟩	k ⟨k⟩	kʷ ⟨kw⟩	ʔ ⟨ʼ⟩
Fricative	voiceless		s ⟨x⟩			h ⟨h⟩
Fricative	voiced		z ⟨z⟩			
Approximant					w ⟨w⟩	
Tap			ɾ ⟨r⟩			

- /s/ may be realized as an alveolar [ts] or postalveolar [tʃ] affricate.
- /z/ has seven allophones:
  - [z] occurs among all villagers in the Maranhão state, as well as older speakers of the Tembé dialect;
  - [d] occurs among Tenetehára-Tembé speakers, specially the younger generations;
  - [dʒ] occurs in free variation in all regions, but is strongly dominant among inhabitants of the Bacurizinho and Canabrava Indigenous Lands;
  - [ʒ] is frequently used in the Pindaré Indigenous Land;
  - [s] appears syllable-initially and is strongly identified in the Canabrava Indigenous Land;
  - [ɾ] is common in the Lagoa Quieta and Juçaral villages, located in the Arariboia Indigenous Land;
  - [j] is restricted to coda position before a consonant or word-finally.

Vowels
	Front	Central	Back
Close	i ⟨i⟩	ɨ ⟨y⟩	u ⟨u⟩
Mid	e ⟨e⟩	ə ⟨à⟩	o ⟨o⟩
Open		a ⟨a⟩	

== Syntax ==
Tenetehára has a verb-subject-object word order. Verbs are marked with person prefixes that reference the subject of the clause:

u-suka Zezin arapuha
3-kill Zezin deer
"Zezin killed a deer."

There are three verb classes, corresponding to transitive, intransitive and stative verbs. Each of these has a different set of verbal prefixes to mark the subject.

Even though it is a verb-initial language, Tenetehára has postpositions instead of prepositions, as would be expected cross-linguistically:

o-ho Zezin ko pe
3-go Zezin field to
"Zezin goes to the field."

A small group of adverbial words, that relate the sentence to its context, can appear in the first position in the clause, followed by the verb and the rest of the sentence.

aipo o-ho ko pe
maybe 3-go field to
"Maybe he went to the field."

== Bibliography ==
- Bendor-Samuel, David (2009) [1969]. Gramática Pedagógica da Língua Guajajara. Anápolis, GO: Associação Internacional de Linguística SIL – Brasil. OCLC 896408604.
- Bendor-Samuel, David (1972). Hierarchical structures in Guajajara. Summer Institute of Linguistics publications in linguistics and related fields. Vol. 37. Norman, OK: Summer Institute of Linguistics of the University of Oklahoma. OCLC 1370420801.
- Chamorro, Pilar (2020). "Past Temporal Reference and Remoteness Distinctions in Guajajára". International Journal of American Linguistics. 86 (3): 331–365. doi:10.1086/708831.
- Duarte, Fábio Bonfim (2003). Ordem de constituintes e movimento em Tembé: minimalismo e anti-simetria (PhD dissertation). Belo Horizonte: Universidade Federal de Minas Gerais.
- Duarte, Fábio Bonfim (2007). Estudos de morfossintaxe Tenetehára. Belo Horizonte: Faculdade de Letras da UFMG. ISBN 978-85-7758-012-5.
- Duarte, Fábio Bonfim (2007). Movimentos de constituintes na língua Tembé. Belo Horizonte: Faculdade de Letras da UFMG.
- Duarte, Fábio Bonfim (2012). "Tenetehára: A predicate-fronting language". Canadian Journal of Linguistics / Revue canadienne de linguistique. 57 (3): 359–386. doi:10.1353/cjl.2012.0042.
- Duarte, Fábio Bonfim; Menezes, Ana Cláudia; da Silva, Cintia Maria Santana (2022-12-29). "O fonema /z/ camaleão na língua Tenetehára: uma abordagem variacionista" [The phoneme /z/ chameleon in the Tenetehára language: a variationist approach]. Revista Brasileira de Linguística Antropológica (in Portuguese). 14 (1): 481–499. doi:10.26512/rbla.v14i1.46457. eISSN 2317-1375. ISSN 2176-834X.
- Menezes, Ana Cláudia; Duarte, Fábio Bonfim (2024). "A natureza sintático-semântica do núcleo voice anticausativo na língua Guajajára". Revista Linguística. 20 (3). doi:10.31513/linguistica.2024.v20n3a65637.
- Harrison, Carl H.; Harrison, Carole W. (2013). Dicionário Guajajara-Português. Anápolis, GO: Associação Internacional de Linguística SIL – Brasil.
