= Kaʼapor =

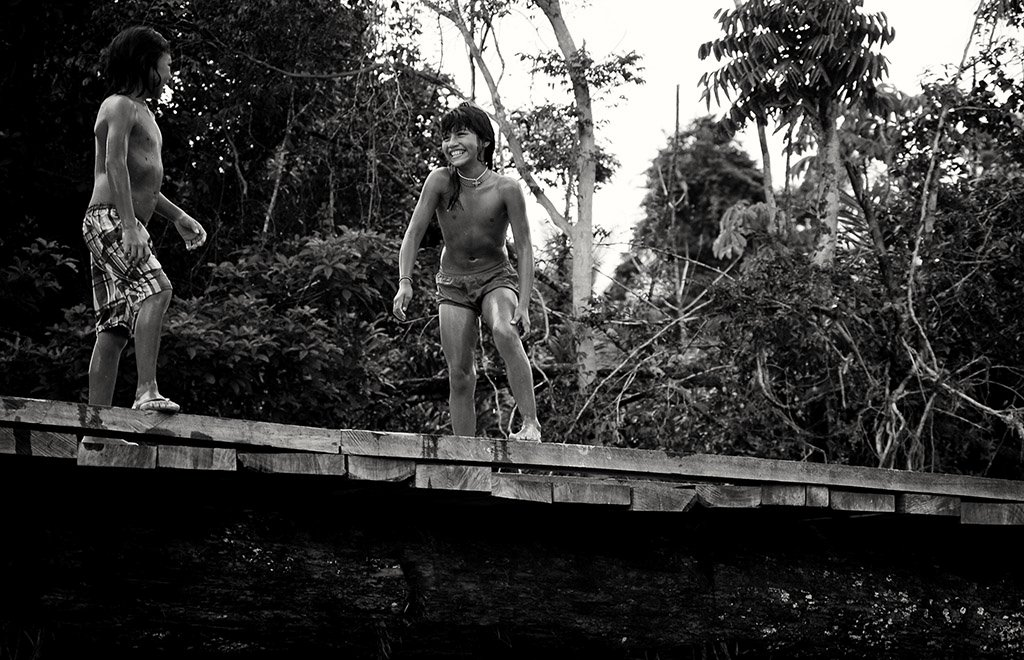

Total population
- approx. 800

Regions with significant populations
- Brazil (Maranhão)

Languages
- Kaʼapor, Kaʼapor Sign Language (entire community), some Portuguese

Religion
- Shamanism, Ancestor worship

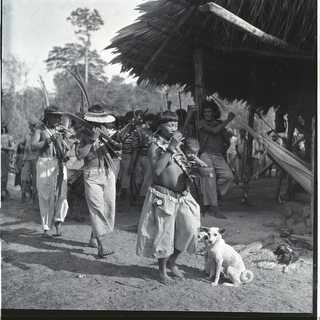
Photo taken by Darcy Ribeiro in 1951 featuring Kaʼapor people

The Kaʼapor are an Indigenous people of Brazil. They live on a protected reserve in the state of Maranhão.

== Ethnography ==
They were the subject of a book by anthropologist Dr. William Balée in an exhaustive study of their ethnobotany lifeways and the historical ecology of the area they currently inhabit.

== Geographical distribution ==
They live in a heavily deforested area of Pre-Amazonian forest, but have managed to protect the forest within their designated reserve.

== Deafness ==
There is a high degree of congenital deafness among the Kaʼapor, and consequently most of the hearing community knows sign language. (See Ka'apor Sign Language.)

== Lands ==
Their forest reserve is under attack from illegal loggers, and in September 2014, the Kaʼapor took matters into their own hands when they attacked a group of loggers, tying them up, and humiliating them, before destroying the logs that had been extracted from the forest and burning the logger's lorry, before eventually setting them free.
