= Awá (Brazil) =

Indigenous people of Brazil

The Awá are an Indigenous people of Brazil living in the Amazon rainforest. There are approximately 350 members, and 100 of them have no contact with the outside world. They are considered highly endangered because of conflicts with logging interests in their territory.

The Awá people speak Guajá, a Tupi–Guaraní language. Originally living in settlements, they adopted a nomadic lifestyle around 1800 to escape incursions by Europeans.

== History ==
During the 19th century, the Awá came under increasing attack by the European settlers in the region, who cleared most of the forests from their land. Beginning around 1801, the Awá people adjusted an increasingly nomadic lifestyle in order to avoid European invaders.

From the mid-1980s onward, some Awá moved to government-established settlements. However, for the most part, they were able to maintain their traditional way of life. Sustaining themselves entirely from their forests in nomadic groups of a few dozen people, and with little or no contact with the outside world.

In 1982, the Brazilian government received a loan of US$900 million from the World Bank and the European Union. One condition of the loan was that the lands of certain Indigenous peoples, including the Awá, would be demarcated and protected; this held particular importance for the Awá, whose forests were being increasingly invaded by outsiders, with many cases of tribespeople being killed by settlers, and the forest on which they depended being destroyed by logging and land clearance for farming.

Without government intervention, it seemed very likely that the Awá and their culture would become extinct. However, the Brazilian government was extraordinarily slow to act on its commitment. It took 20 years of sustained pressure from campaigning organisations such as Survival International and, earlier, the Forest Peoples Programme before, in March 2003, the Awá's land was finally demarcated.

Meanwhile, encroachment on their land and a series of massacres had reduced their numbers to about 300, only about 67 of whom were still living their traditional hunter-gatherer way of life.

In late 2011, illegal loggers burned an 8-year-old Awá girl alive after she wandered out of her village. The murder happened inside a protected area in the state of Maranhão. Luis Carlos Guajajaras, a leader from another related people, the Guajajara, said that the girl had been killed as a warning to other native peoples living in the protected area.

According to the Indigenous Missionary Council, about 450 Indigenous people were murdered between 2003 and 2010. An investigation discovered the Awá camp in question had been destroyed by loggers. According to Survival International, a human rights organisation that campaigns for the rights of Indigenous tribal peoples and considers them to be the "earth's most threatened tribe", Awá forests are now disappearing faster than in any other Indian area in the Brazilian Amazon.

In April 2012, Survival International launched a worldwide campaign, backed by the actor Colin Firth, to protect the Awá people.

In September 2012, Brazil's Indian Affairs Department claimed that loggers were only 6 km (3.7 mi) away from the Awá.

In 2019, Mídia Índia, an indigenous film-making association, released a rough cut video of uncontacted tribe members, as activists warn of growing threats to this tribe from loggers who are nearing their traditional hunting ground. It was shown on Brazil's Globo TV on 21 July 2019, and features in the documentary, "Ka'a Zar Ukize Wá – Forest Keepers in Danger" by Mídia Índia. It was made in collaboration with the Instituto Socioambiental and the Instituto Catitu with the support of organizations including Instituto Makarapy, If Not Us Then Who and Survival International. In July 2021, it was confirmed that one of the tribe's members, Karapiru Awá Guajá, had died of COVID-19 earlier in the month, at an estimated age of 75. Guajá, who campaigned against the destruction of Awá land and for the rights of Indigenous Brazilian peoples, had been vaccinated against the virus.
