= Kaʼapor Sign Language =

Village sign language used in Brazil

- Urubu(–Kaʼapor) Sign Language
- Native to: Brazil
- Region: Maranhão
- Ethnicity: Kaʼapor
- Native speakers: unknown: 7 monolingual deaf cited (1968) about 500 hearing signers
- Language family: village sign

Language codes
- ISO 639-3: uks
- Glottolog: urub1243
- ELP: Urubú-Kaapor Sign Language

Kaʼapor Sign Language (also known as Urubu Sign Language or Urubu–Kaʼapor Sign Language, although these are pejorative; Portuguese: Língua de sinais caapor brasileira) is a village sign language used by the small community of Kaʼapor people in the Brazilian state of Maranhão. Linguist Jim Kakumasu observed in 1968 that the number of deaf people in the community was 7 out of a population of about 500. This relatively high ratio of deafness (1 in 75) led to both hearing and deaf members of the community using the language, and most hearing children grow up bilingual in the spoken and signed languages. The current state of the language is unknown. Other Indigenous tribes in the region have also been reported to use sign languages, and to communicate between themselves using sign language pidgins.

Notable features of Kaʼapor Sign Language are its object–subject–verb word order, and its locating of the past in front of the signer and the future behind, in contrast to sign languages of European origin, including American Sign Language, Auslan and New Zealand Sign Language. This may represent a world view of the past as something visible, and the future as unknowable.

Kakumasu noted several features which sign language linguists today recognise as common to other sign languages, such as the use of name signs. Conditional and imperative grammatical moods are marked by non-manual features such as a widening of the eyes and tensing of facial muscles. Questions are marked with a question sign either before or after the clause, described as "a motion of the index finger towards the referent (addressee) with a slight wrist twist."

== See also ==
- Al-Sayyid Bedouin Sign Language
- Providence Island Sign Language
- Martha's Vineyard Sign Language
- Adamorobe Sign Language
