= Historical ecology =

Study of ecosystems over time

Historical ecology is a research program that focuses on the interactions between humans and their environment over long-term periods of time, typically over the course of centuries. In order to carry out this work, historical ecologists synthesize long-series data collected by practitioners in diverse fields. Rather than concentrating on one specific event, historical ecology aims to study and understand this interaction across both time and space in order to gain a full understanding of its cumulative effects. Through this interplay, humans both adapt to and shape the environment, continuously contributing to landscape transformation. Historical ecologists recognize that humans have had world-wide influences, impact landscape in dissimilar ways which increase or decrease species diversity, and that a holistic perspective is critical to be able to understand that system.

Piecing together landscapes requires a sometimes difficult union between natural and social sciences, close attention to geographic and temporal scales, a knowledge of the range of human ecological complexity, and the presentation of findings in a way that is useful to researchers in many fields. Those tasks require theory and methods drawn from geography, biology, ecology, history, sociology, anthropology, and other disciplines. Common methods include historical research, climatological reconstructions, plant and animal surveys, archaeological excavations, ethnographic interviews, and landscape reconstructions.

== History ==
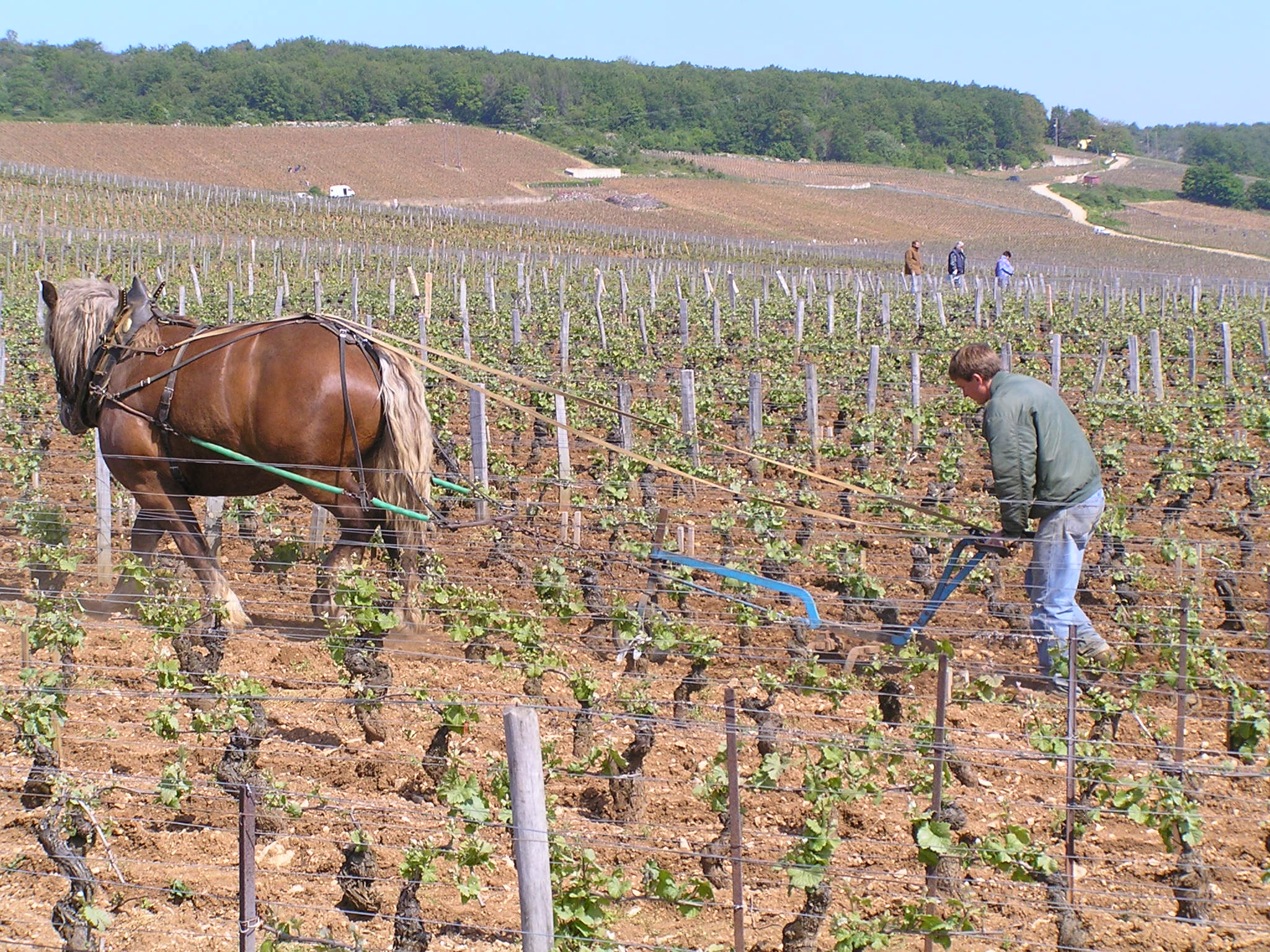
Historical ecology studies the interactions between people and their environment over the long term.

The discipline has several sites of origins by researchers who shared a common interest in the problem of ecology and history, but with a diversity of approaches. Edward Smith Deevey, Jr. used the term in the 1960s to describe a methodology that had been in long development. Deevey wished to bring together the practices of "general ecology" which was studied in an experimental laboratory, with a "historical ecology" which relied on evidence collected through fieldwork. For example, Deevey used radiocarbon dating to reconcile biologists’ successions of plants and animals with the sequences of material culture and sites discovered by archaeologists.

In the 1980s, members of the history department at the University of Arkansas at Little Rock organized a lecture series entitled "Historical Ecology: Essays on Environment and Social Change" The authors noted the public's concerns with pollution and dwindling natural resources, and they began a dialogue between researchers with specialties which spanned the social sciences. The papers highlighted the importance of understanding social and political structures, personal identities, perceptions of nature, and the multiplicity of solutions for environmental problems.

The emergence of historical ecology as a coherent discipline was driven by a number of long-term research projects in historical ecology of tropical, temperate and arctic environments:

E.S. Deevey's Historical Ecology of the Maya Project (1973-1984) was carried out by archaeologists and biologists who combined data from lake sediments, settlement patterns, and material from excavations in the central Petén District of Guatemala to refute the hypotheses that a collapse of Mayan urban areas was instigated by faltering food production.

Carole L. Crumley's Burgundian Landscape Project (1974–present) is carried out by a multidisciplinary research team aimed at identifying the multiple factors which have contributed to the long-term durability of the agricultural economy of Burgundy, France.

Thomas H. McGovern's Inuit-Norse Project (1976–present) uses archaeology, environmental reconstruction, and textual analysis to examine the changing ecology of Nordic colonizers and indigenous peoples in Greenland, Iceland, Faeroes, and Shetland.

In recent years the approaches to historical ecology have been expanded to include coastal and marine environments:

Stellwagen Bank National Marine Sanctuary Project (1984–present) examines Massachusetts, USA cod fishing in the 17th through 19th centuries through historical records.

Florida Keys Coral Reef Eco-region Project (1990–present) researchers at the Scripps Institute of Oceanography are examining archival records including natural history descriptions, maps and charts, family and personal papers, and state and colonial records in order to understand the impact of over-fishing and habitat loss in the Florida Keys, USA which contains the third largest coral reef in the world.

Monterey Bay National Marine Sanctuary Historical Ecology (2008–present) seeks to collect relevant historical data on fishing, whaling, and trade of the furs of aquatic animals in order form a baseline for environmental restorations of the California, USA coast.

== Relations with other disciplines ==
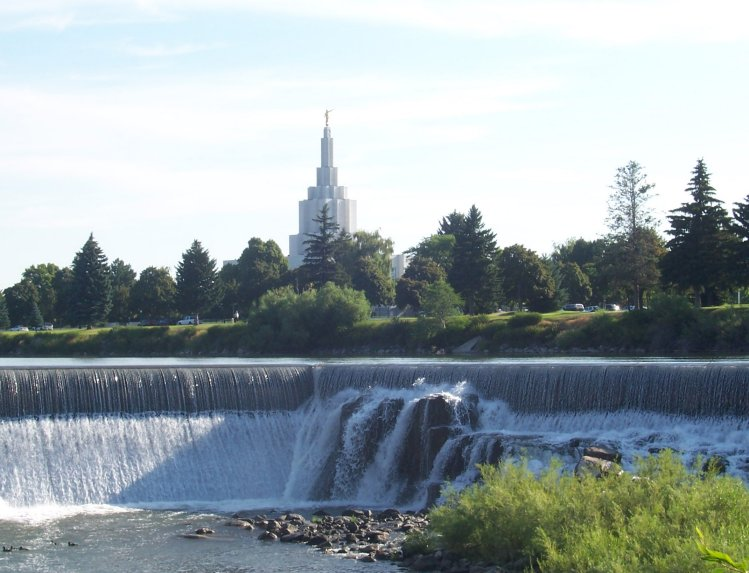
Manmade nature: In Idaho Falls, Idaho, these waterfalls replaced naturally occurring ones

Historical ecology is interdisciplinary in principle; at the same time, it borrows heavily from the rich intellectual history of environmental anthropology. Western scholars have known since the time of Plato that the history of environmental changes cannot be separated from human history. Several ideas have been used to describe human interaction with the environment, the first of which is the concept of the Great Chain of Being, or inherent design in nature. In this, all forms of life are ordered, with Humanity as the highest being, due to its knowledge and ability to modify nature. This lends to the concept of another nature, a manmade nature, which involves design or modification by humans, as opposed to design inherent in nature.

Interest in environmental transformation continued to increase in the 18th, 19th, and 20th centuries, resulting in a series of new intellectual approaches. One of these approaches was environmental determinism, developed by geographer Friedrich Ratzel. This view held that it is not social conditions, but environmental conditions, which determine the culture of a population. Ratzsel also viewed humans as restricted by nature, for their behaviors are limited to and defined by their environment. A later approach was the historical viewpoint of Franz Boas which refuted environmental determinism, claiming that it is not nature, but specifics of history, that shape human cultures. This approach recognized that although the environment may place limitations on societies, every environment will impact each culture differently. Julian Steward's cultural ecology is considered a fusion of environmental determinism and Boas' historical approach. Steward felt it was neither nature nor culture that had the most impact on a population, but instead, the mode of subsistence used in a given environment.

Anthropologist Roy Rappaport introduced the field of ecological anthropology in a deliberate attempt to move away from cultural ecology. Studies in ecological anthropology borrow heavily from the natural sciences, in particular, the concept of the ecosystem from systems ecology. In this approach, also called systems theory, ecosystems are seen as self-regulating, and as returning to a state of equilibrium. This theory views human populations as static and as acting in harmony with the environment.

The revisions of anthropologist Eric Wolf and others are especially pertinent to the development of historical ecology. These revisions and related critiques of environmental anthropology undertook to take into account the temporal and spatial dimensions of history and cultures, rather than continuing to view populations as static. These critiques led to the development of historical ecology by revealing the need to consider the historical, cultural, and evolutionary nature of landscapes and societies. Thus, historical ecology as a research program developed to allow for the examination of all types of societies, simple or complex, and their interactions with the environment over space and time.

== Landscapes in historical ecology ==
In historical ecology, the landscape is defined as an area of interaction between human culture and the non-human environment. The landscape is a perpetually changing, physical manifestation of history. Historical ecology revises the notion of the ecosystem and replaces it with the landscape. While an ecosystem is static and cyclic, a landscape is historical. While the ecosystem concept views the environment as always trying to return to a state of equilibrium, the landscape concept considers "landscape transformation" to be a process of evolution. Landscapes do not return to a state of equilibrium, but are palimpsests of successive disturbances over time. The use of "landscape" instead of "ecosystem" as the core unit of analysis lies at the heart of historical ecology.

Various individuals and schools of thought have informed the idea of the landscape as historical ecologists conceive of it. The Old English words landskift, landscipe or landscaef refer to environments that have been altered by humans. As this etymology demonstrates, landscapes have been conceived of as related to human culture since at least the 5th century CE. Cultural and historical geographers have had a more recent influence. They adopted this idea from nineteenth-century German architects, gardeners, and landscape painters in Europe, Australia, and North America. Landscapes are not only physical objects, but also "forms of knowledge". Landscapes have cultural meanings, for example, the sacredness in many cultures of burial grounds. This recognition of landscapes as forms of knowledge is central to historical ecology, which studies landscapes from an anthropocentric perspective.

The idea of the cultural landscape is directly attributed to American geographer Carl Sauer. Sauer's theories developed as a critique of environmental determinism, which was a popular theory in the early twentieth century. Sauer's pioneering 1925 paper "The Morphology of Landscape" is now fundamental to many disciplines and defines the domain. In this, the term landscape is used in a geographical sense to mean an arbitrarily selected section of reality; morphology means the conceptual and methodological processes for altering it. Hence to Sauer, wherever humans lived and impacted the environment, landscapes with determinate histories resulted.

The perception of the landscape in historical ecology differs from other disciplines, such as landscape ecology. Landscape ecologists often attribute the depletion of biodiversity to human disturbance. Historical ecologists recognize that this is not always true. These changes are due to multiple factors that contribute to the ever-changing landscape. Landscape ecology still focuses on areas defined as ecosystems. In this, the ecosystem perpetually returns to a state of equilibrium. In contrast, historical ecologists view the landscape as perpetually changing. Landscape ecologists view noncyclical human events and natural disasters as external influences, while historical ecologists view disturbances as an integral part of the landscape's history. It is this integration of the concept of disturbance and history that allows for landscape to be viewed as palimpsests, representing successive layers of change, rather than as static entities.

Historical ecologists recognize that landscapes undergo continuous alteration over time and these modifications are part of that landscape's history. Historical ecology recognizes that there is a primary and a secondary succession that occurs in the landscape. These successions should be understood without a preconceived bias against humanity. Landscape transformations are ecological successions driven by human impacts. Primary landscape transformations occur when human activity results in a complete turnover of species and major substrate modifications in certain habitats while secondary landscape transformations involve human-induced changes in species proportions. The stages of landscape transformation demonstrate the history of a landscape. These stages can be brought on by humans or natural causes. Parts of the Amazon rainforest exhibit different stages of landscape transformation such as the impact of indigenous slash-and-burn horticulture on plant species compositions. Such landscape transformation does not inherently reduce biodiversity or harm the environment. There are many cases in which human-mediated disturbance increases biodiversity as landscapes transform over time.

Historical ecology challenges the very notion of a pristine landscape, such as virgin rainforests. The idea that the landscape of the New World was uninhabited and unchanged by those groups that did inhabit it was fundamental to the justifications of colonialism. Thus, perceptions of landscape have profound consequences on the histories of societies and their interactions with the environment. All landscapes have been altered by various organisms and mechanisms prior to human existence on Earth. Humans have always transformed the landscapes they inhabit, however, and today there are no landscapes on Earth that have not been affected by humans in some way.

Human alterations have occurred in different phases, including the period prior to industrialization. These changes have been studied through the archeological record of modern humans and their history. The evidence that classless societies, like foragers and trekkers, were able to change a landscape was a breakthrough in historical ecology and anthropology as a whole. Using an approach that combines history, ecology, and anthropology, a landscape's history can be observed and deduced through the traces of the various mechanisms that have altered it, anthropogenic or otherwise. Understanding the unique nature of every landscape, in addition to relations among landscapes, and the forms which comprise the landscape, is key to understanding historical ecology.

== Human-mediated disturbance ==
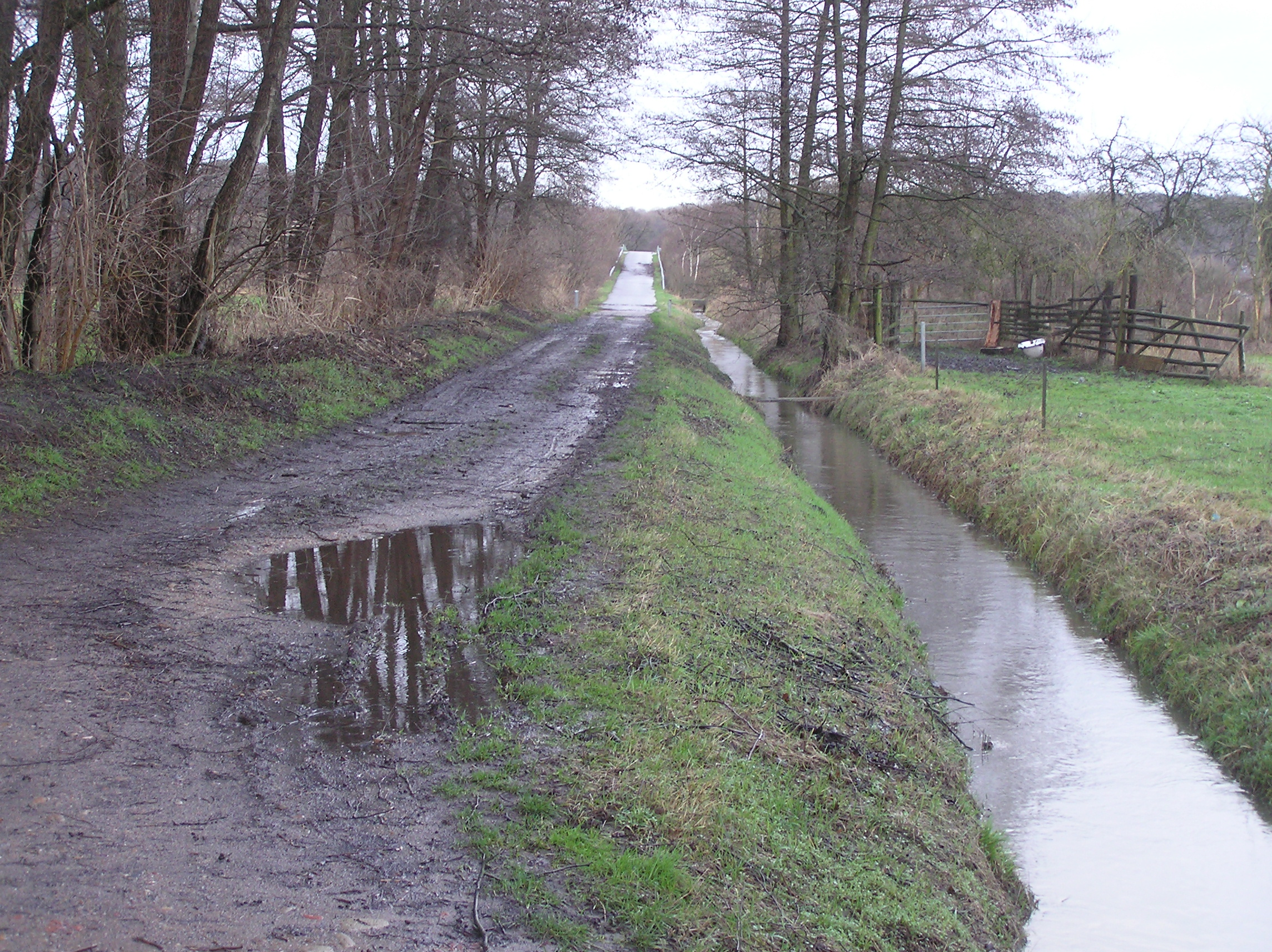
Man-made irrigation canal

Homo sapiens have interacted with the environment throughout history, generating a long-lasting influence on landscapes worldwide. Humans sometimes actively change their landscapes, while at other times their actions alter landscapes through secondary effects. These changes are called human-mediated disturbances, and are effected through various mechanisms. These mechanisms vary; they may be detrimental in some cases, but advantageous in others.

Both destructive and at times constructive, anthropogenic fire is the most immediately visible human-mediated disturbance, and without it, many landscapes would become denatured. Humans have practiced controlled burns of forests globally for thousands of years, shaping landscapes in order to better fit their needs. They burned vegetation and forests to create space for crops, sometimes resulting in higher levels of species diversity. Today, in the absence of indigenous populations who once practiced controlled burns (most notably in North America and Australia), naturally ignited wildfires have increased. In addition, there has been destabilization of "ecosystem after ecosystem, and there is good documentation to suggest fire exclusion by Europeans has led to floral and faunal extinctions."

Biological invasions and the spread of pathogens and diseases are two mechanisms that spread both inadvertently and purposefully. Biological invasions begin with introductions of foreign species or biota into an already existing environment. They can be spread by stowaways on ships or even as weapons in warfare. In some cases a new species may wreak havoc on a landscape, causing the loss of native species and destruction of the landscape. In other cases, the new species may fill a previously empty niche, and play a positive role. The spread of new pathogens, viruses, and diseases rarely have any positive effects; new pathogens and viruses sometimes destroy populations lacking immunities to those diseases. Some pathogens have the ability to transfer from one species to another, and may be spread as a secondary effect of a biological invasion.

Other mechanisms of human-mediated disturbances include water management and soil management. In Mediterranean Europe, these have been recognized as ways of landscape alteration since the Roman Empire. Cicero noted that through fertilization, irrigation, and other activities, humans had essentially created a second world. At present, fertilization yields larger, more productive harvests of crops, but also has had adverse effects on many landscapes, such as decreasing the diversity of plant species and adding pollutants to soils.

=== Anthropogenic fire ===
Anthropogenic fire is a mechanism of human-mediated disturbance, defined within historical ecology as a means of altering the landscape in a way that better suits human needs. The most common form of anthropogenic fire is controlled burns, or broadcast burning, which people have employed for thousands of years. Forest fires and burning tend to carry negative connotations, yet controlled burns can have a favorable impact on landscape diversity, formation, and protection.

Broadcast burning alters the biota of a landscape. The immediate effect of a forest fire is a decrease in diversity. This negative impact associated with broadcast burning, however, is only temporary. Cycles of burning will allow the landscape to gradually increase in diversity. The time required for this change is dependent on the intensity, frequency, timing, and size of the controlled burns. After a few cycles, however, diversity increases. The adaptation to fire has shaped many of Earth's landscapes.

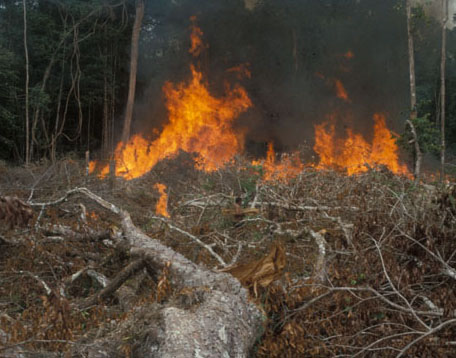
A swidden fire, an example of a controlled burn

In addition to fostering diversity, controlled burns have helped change landscapes. These changes can range from grasslands to woodlands, from prairies or forest-steppes, to scrubland to forest. Whatever the case, these transformations increase diversity and engender landscapes more suitable to human needs, creating patches rich in utilitarian and natural resources.

In addition to increasing diversity of landscapes, broadcast burning can militate against catastrophic wildfires. Forest fires gained a negative connotation because of cultural references to uncontrolled fires that take lives and destroy homes and properties. Controlled burns can decrease the risk of wildfires through the regular burning of undergrowth that would otherwise fuel rampant burning. Broadcast burning has helped to fireproof landscapes by burning off undergrowth and using up potential fuel, leaving little or no chance for a wildfire to be sparked by lightning.

Of all of the mechanisms of human-mediated disturbances, anthropogenic fire has become one of great interest to ecologists, geographers, soil scientists, and anthropologists alike. By studying the effects of anthropogenic fires, anthropologists have been able to identify landscape uses and requirements of past cultures. Ecologists became interested in the study of anthropogenic fire as to utilize methods from previous cultures to develop policies for regular burning. Geographers and soil scientists are interested in the utility of anthropic soils caused by burning in the past. The interest in anthropogenic fire came about in the wake of the Industrial Revolution. This time period included a mass migration from rural to urban areas, which decreased controlled burning in the countryside. This led to an increase in the frequency and strength of wildfires, thus initiating a need to develop proper prevention methods. Historical ecology focuses on the impact on landscapes through human-mediated disturbances, once such being anthropogenic fire. It is a fusion of ecological, geographical, anthropological, and pedological interests.

=== Biological invasions ===
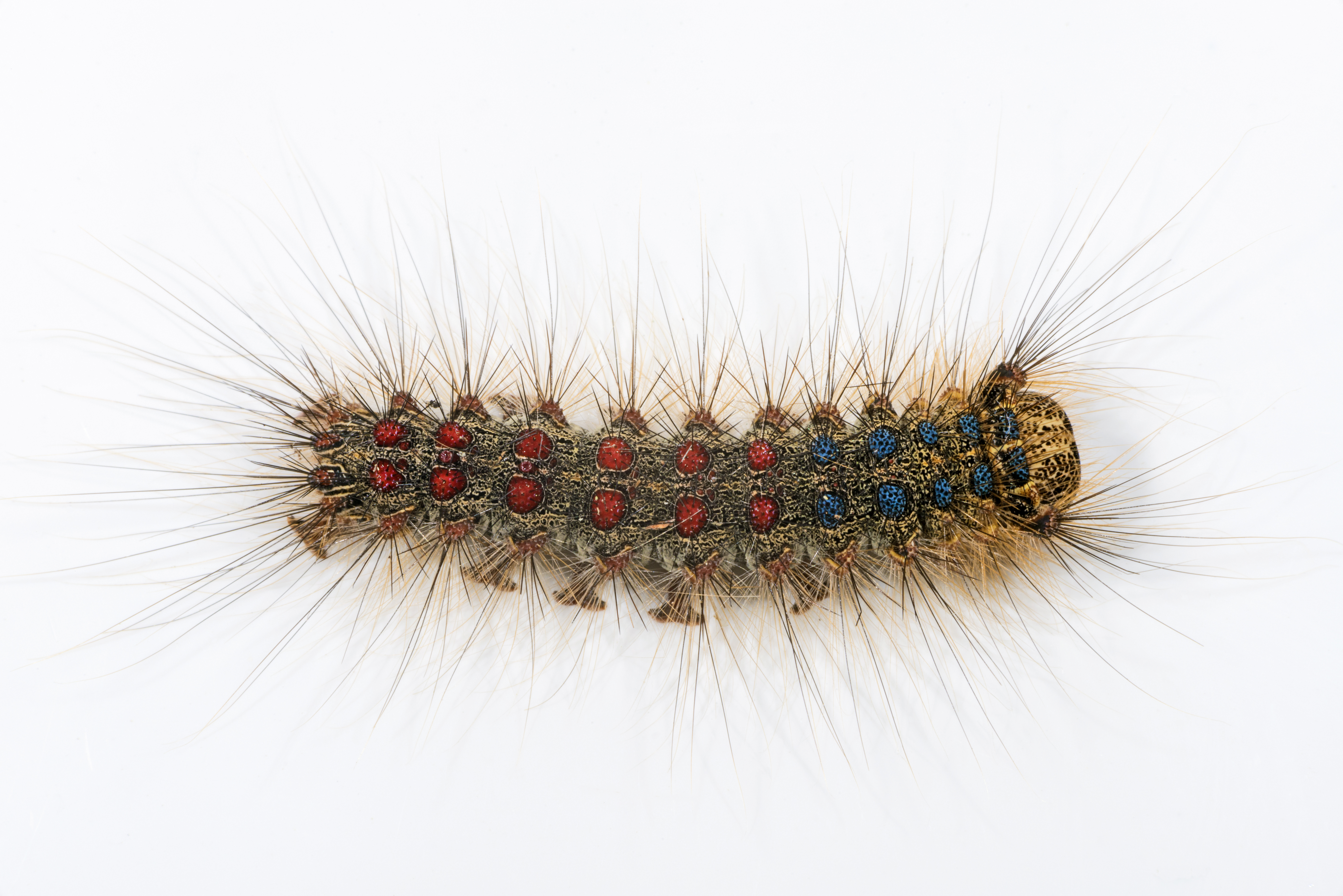
Lymantria dispar

Biological invasions are composed of exotic biota that enter a landscape and replace species with which they share similarities in structure and ecological function. Because they multiply and grow quickly, invasive species can eliminate or greatly reduce existing flora and fauna by various mechanisms, such as direct competitive exclusion. Invasive species typically spread at a faster rate when they have no natural predators or when they fill an empty niche. These invasions often occur in a historical context and are classified as a type of human-mediated disturbance called human-mediated invasions.

Invasive species can be transported intentionally or accidentally. Many invasive species originate in shipping areas from where they are unintentionally transported to their new location. Sometimes human populations intentionally introduce species into new landscapes to serve various purposes, ranging from decoration to erosion control. These species can later become invasive and dramatically modify the landscape. Not all exotic species are invasive; in fact, the majority of newly introduced species never become invasive. Humans have on their migrations through the ages taken along plants of agricultural and medicinal value, so that the modern distribution of such favored species is a clear mapping of the routes they have traveled and the places they have settled.

One example of an invasive species that has had a significant impact on the landscape is the gypsy moth (Lymantria dispar). The foliage-feeding gypsy moth is originally from temperate Eurasia; it was intentionally brought to the United States by an entomologist in 1869. Many specimens escaped from captivity and have since changed the ecology of deciduous and coniferous forests in North America by defoliation. This has led not only to the loss of wildlife habitat, but also other forest services, such as carbon sequestration and nutrient cycling. After its initial introduction, the continued accidental transport of its larvae across North America has contributed to its population explosion.

Regardless of the medium of introduction, biological invasions have a considerable effect on the landscape. The goal of eliminating invasive species is not new; Plato wrote about the benefits of biotic and landscape diversity centuries ago. However, the notion of eliminating invasive species is difficult to define because there is no canonical length of time that a species must exist in a specific environment until it is no longer classified as invasive. European forestry defines plants as being archetypes if they existed in Europe before 1500 and neophytes if they arrived after 1500. This classification is still arbitrary and some species have unknown origins while others have become such key components of their landscape that they are best understood as keystone species. As a result, their removal would have an enormous impact on the landscape, but not necessarily cause a return to conditions that existed before the invasion.

=== Epidemic disease ===
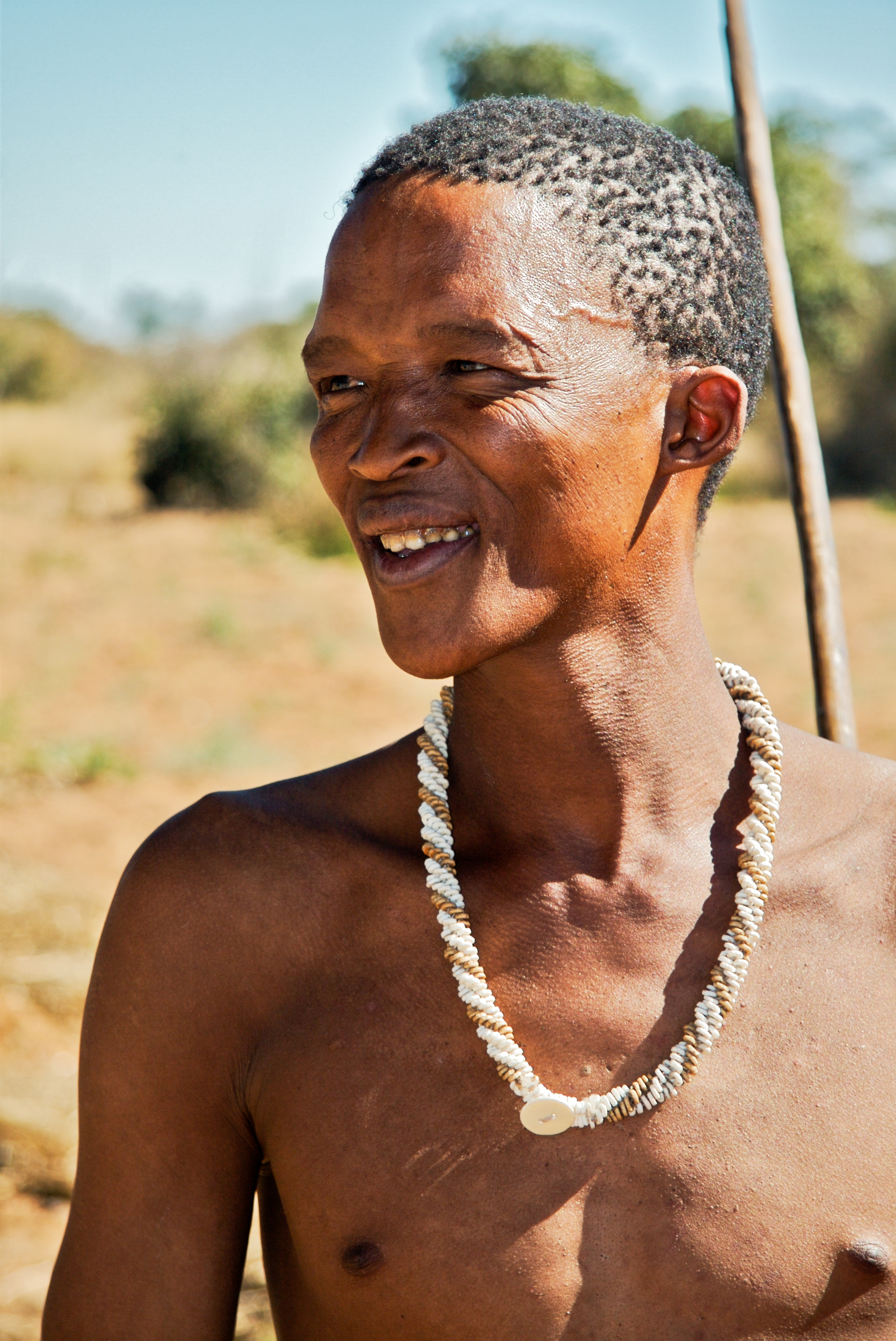
A San Tribesman: Those living in dry climates have fewer intestinal parasites.

A clear relationship between nature and people is expressed through human disease. Infectious disease can thus be seen as another example of human-mediated disturbance as humans are hosts for infectious diseases. Historically, evidence of epidemic diseases is associated with the beginnings of agriculture and sedentary communities. Previously, human populations were too small and mobile for most infections to become established as chronic diseases. Permanent settlements, due to agriculture, allowed for more inter-community interaction, enabling infections to develop as specifically human pathogens.

Holistic and interdisciplinary approaches to the study of human disease have revealed a reciprocal relationship between humans and parasites. The variety of parasites found within the human body often reflects the diversity of the environment in which that individual resides. For instance, Bushmen and Australian Aborigines have half as many intestinal parasites as African and Malaysian hunter-gatherers living in a species-rich tropical rainforest. Infectious diseases can be either chronic or acute, and epidemic or endemic, impacting the population in any given community to different extents. Thus, human-mediated disturbance can either increase or decrease species diversity in a landscape, causing a corresponding change in pathogenic diversity.

=== Transformation of waterways ===
Historical ecologists postulate that landscape transformations have occurred throughout history, even before the dawn of western civilization. Human-mediated disturbances are predated by soil erosion and animals damming waterways which contributed to waterway transformations. Landscapes, in turn, were altered by waterway transformation. Historical ecology views the effects of human-mediated disturbances on waterway transformation as both subtle and drastic occurrences. Waterways have been modified by humans through the building of irrigation canals, expanding or narrowing waterways, and multiple other adjustments done for agricultural or transportation usage.

The evidence for past and present agricultural use of wetlands in Mesoamerica suggests an evolutionary sequence of landscape and waterway alteration. Pre-Columbian, indigenous agriculturalists developed capabilities with which to raise crops under a wide range of ecological conditions, giving rise to a multiplicity of altered, cultivated landscapes. The effects of waterway transformation were particularly evident in Mesoamerica, where agricultural practices ranged from swiddening to multicropped hydraulically transformed wetlands.

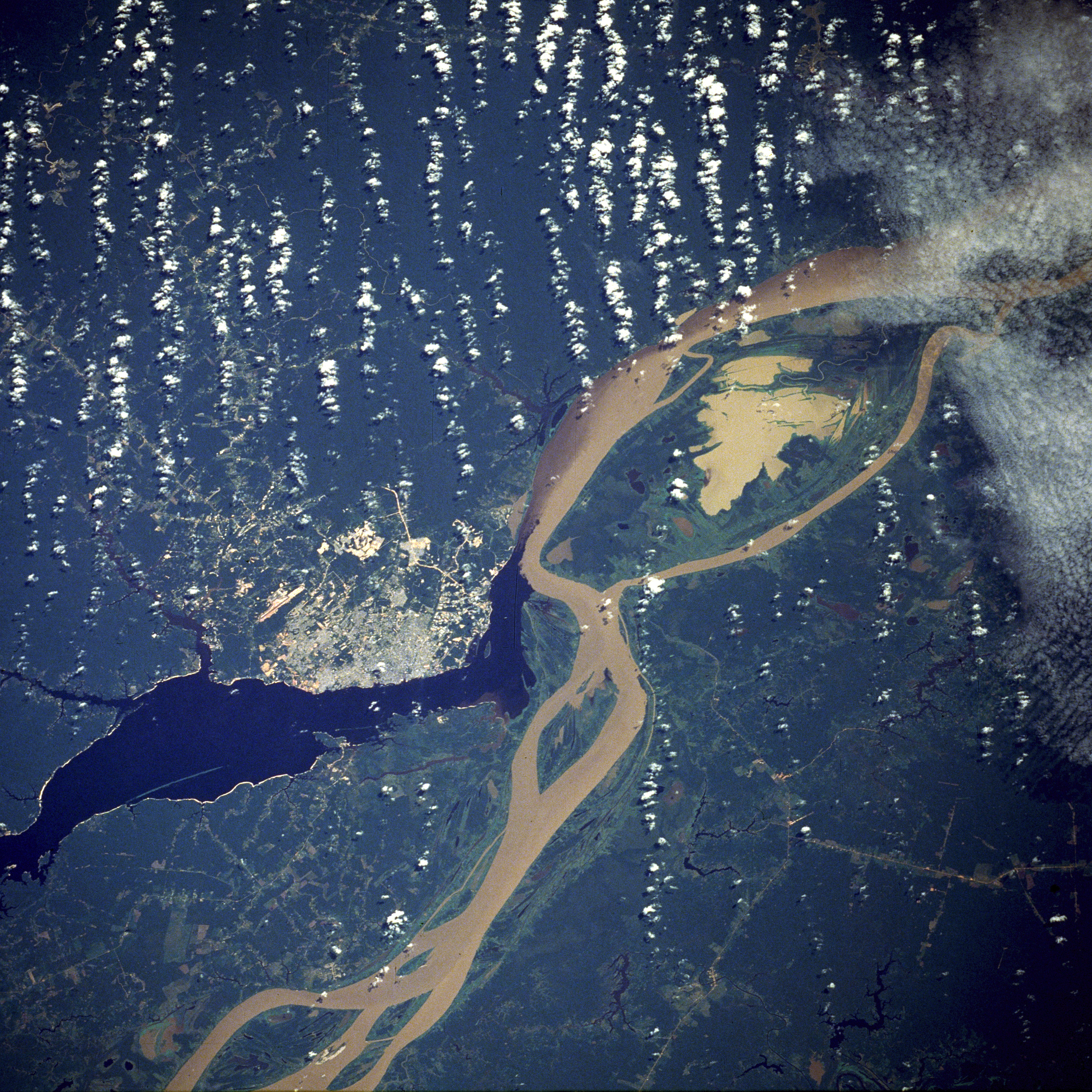
Manaus, the largest city on the Amazon, as seen from a NASA satellite image, surrounded by the muddy Amazon River and the dark Rio Negro

Historical ecologists view the Amazon basin landscape as cultural and embodying social labor. The Amazon River has been altered by the local population for crop growth and water transportation. Previous research failed to account for human interaction with the Amazon landscape. Recent research, however, has demonstrated that the landscape has been manipulated by its indigenous population over time. The continual, natural shifting of rivers, however, often masked the human disturbances in the course of rivers. As a result, the indigenous populations in the Amazon are often overlooked for their ability to alter the land and the river.

However, waterway transformation has been successfully identified in the Amazon landscape. Clark Erickson observes that pre-Hispanic savanna peoples of the Bolivian Amazon built an anthropogenic landscape through the construction of raised fields, large settlement mounds, and earthen causeways. Erickson, on the basis of location, form, patterning, associations and ethnographic analogy, identified a particular form of earthwork, the zigzag structure, as fish weirs in the savanna of Baures, Bolivia. The artificial zigzag structures were raised from the adjacent savanna and served as a means to harvest the fish who used them to migrate and spawn.

Further evidence of waterway transformation is found in Igarapé Guariba in Brazil. It is an area in the Amazon basin where people have intervened in nature to change rivers and streams with dramatic results. Researcher Hugh Raffles notes that British naturalists Henry Walter Bates and Alfred Russel Wallace noted waterway transformation as they sailed through a canal close to the town of Igarapé-Miri in 1848. Archival materials identifies that it had been dug out by slaves. In his studies he notes an abundance of documentary and anecdotal evidence which supports landscape transformation by the manipulation of waterways. Transformation continues in more recent times as noted when in 1961, a group of villagers from Igarapé Guariba cut a canal about two miles (3 km) long across fields thick with tall papyrus grass and into dense tropical rain forest. The narrow canal and the stream that flowed into it have since formed a full-fledged river more than six hundred yards wide at its mouth, and the landscape in this part of the northern Brazilian state of Amapá was dramatically transformed. In this case, an area of swampy grassland became a lake, easing access to a rich area of forest.

In general, with an increase in global population growth, comes an increase in the anthropogenic transformation of waterways. The Sumerians had created extensive irrigations by 4000 BC. As the population increased in the 3,000 years of agriculture, the ditches and canals increased in number. By the early 1900s, ditching, dredging, and diking had become common practice. This led to an increase in erosion which impacted the landscapes. Human activities have affected the natural role of rivers and its communal value. These changes in waterways have impacted the floodplains, natural tidal patterns, and the surrounding land.

The importance of understanding such transformation is it provides a more accurate understanding to long-standing popular and academic insights of the Amazon, as well as other ecological settings, as places where indigenous populations have dealt with the forces of nature. Ecological landscapes have been portrayed as an environment, not a society. Recent studies supported by historical ecologists, however, understand that ecological landscape like the Amazon are biocultural, rather than simply natural and provide for a greater understanding of anthropogenic transformation of both waterways and landscapes.

=== Soil management ===
Soil management, or direct human interaction with the soil, is another mechanism of anthropogenic change studied by historical ecologists. Soil management can take place through rearranging soils, altering drainage patterns, and building large earthen formations. Consistent with the basic premises of historical ecology, it is recognized that anthropogenic soil management practices can have both positive and negative effects on local biodiversity. Some agricultural practices have led to organically and chemically impoverished soils. In the North American Midwest, industrial agriculture has led to a loss in topsoil. Salinization of the Euphrates River has occurred due to ancient Mesopotamian irrigation, and detrimental amounts of zinc have been deposited in the New Caliber River of Nigeria. Elsewhere, soil management practices may not have any effect on soil fertility. The iconic mounds of the Hopewell Indians built in the Ohio River valley likely served a religious or ceremonial purpose, and show little evidence of changing soil fertility in the landscape.

The case of soil management in the Neotropics (including the Amazon) is a classic example of beneficial results of human-mediated disturbance. In this area, prehistoric peoples altered the texture and chemical composition of natural soils. The altered black and brown earths, known as Amazon Dark Earths, or Terra preta, are actually much more fertile than unaltered surrounding soils. Furthermore, the increased soil fertility improves the results of agriculture. Terra preta is characterized by the presence of charcoal in high concentrations, along with pottery shards and organic residues from plants, animal bones, and feces. It is also shows increased levels of nutrients such as nitrogen, phosphorus, calcium, zinc, and manganese; along with high levels of microorganic activity. It is now accepted that these soils are a product of a labor-intensive technique termed slash-and-char. In contrast to the commonly known slash-and-burn technique, this uses a lower temperature burn that produces more charcoal than ashes. Research shows these soils were created by human activity between 9000 and 2500 years ago. Contemporary local farmers actively seek out and sell this dark earth, which covers around 10% of the Amazon basin. Harvesting Terra preta does not deplete it however, for it has the ability to regenerate at the rate of one centimeter per year by sequestering more carbon.

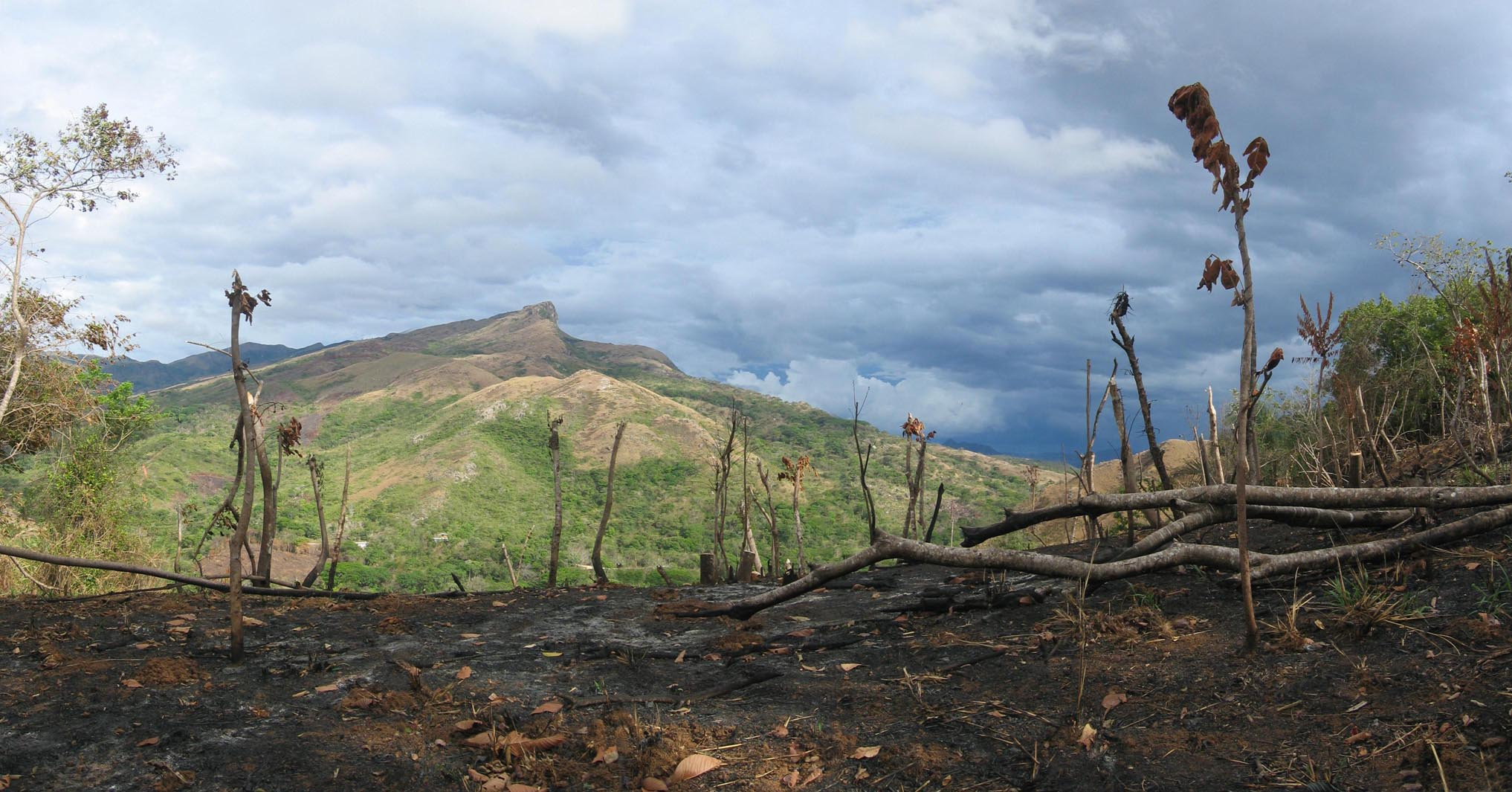
Scorched land resulting from slash-and-burn agriculture

Interest in and the study of Amazon dark earths was advanced with the work of Wim Sombroek. Sombroek's interest in soil fertility came from his childhood. He was born in the Netherlands and lived through the Dutch famine of 1944. His family subsided on a small plot of land that had been maintained and improved for generations. Sombroek's father, in turn, improved the land by sowing it with the ash and cinders from their home. Sombroek came across Terra preta in the 1950s and it reminded him of the soil from his childhood, inspiring him to study it further. Soil biologist from the University of Kansas William W. Woods is also a major figure in Terra preta research. Woods has made several key discoveries and his comprehensive bibliography on the subject doubles in size every decade.

Globally, forests are well known for having greater biodiversity than nearby savannas or grasslands. Thus, the creation of ‘forest islands’ in multiple locations can be considered a positive result of human activity. This is evident in the otherwise uniform savannas of Guinea and central Brazil that are punctured by scattered clumps of trees. These clumps are the result of generations of intense resource management. Earth works and mounds formed by humans, such as the Ibibate mound complex in the Llanos de Mojos in Bolivia, are examples of built environments that have undergone landscape transformation and provide habitats for a greater number of species than the surrounding wetland areas. The forest islands in the Bolivian Amazon not only increase the local plant species diversity, but also enhance subsistence possibilities for the local people.

== Applied historical ecology ==
Historical ecology involves an understanding of multiple fields of study such as archaeology and cultural history as well as ecological processes, species diversity, natural variability, and the impact of human-mediated disturbances. Having a broad understanding of landscapes allows historical ecology to be applied to various disciplines. Studying past relationships between humans and landscapes can successfully aid land managers by helping develop holistic, environmentally rational, and historically accurate plans of action. As summarized in the postulates of historical ecology, humans play significant roles in the creation and destruction of landscapes as well as in ecosystem function. Through experience, many indigenous societies learned how to effectively alter their landscapes and biotic distributions. Modern societies, seeking to curtail the magnitude of their effects on the landscape, can use historical ecology to promote sustainability by learning from the past. Farmers in the Amazon region, for example, now utilize nutrient-rich terra preta to increase crop yields much like the indigenous societies that lived long before them.

Historical ecology can also aid in the goals of other fields of study. Conservation biology recognizes different types of land management processes, each attempting to maintain the landscape and biota in their present form. Restoration ecology restores sites to former function, structure, and components of biological diversity through active modification of the landscapes. Reclamation deals with shifting a degraded ecosystem back toward a higher value or use, but not necessarily to its original state. Replacement of an ecosystem would create an entirely new one. Revegetation involves new additions of biota into a landscape, not limited to the original inhabitants of an area. Each method can be enriched by the application of historical ecology and the past knowledge it supplies. The interdisciplinary nature of historical ecology would permit conservation biologists to create more effective and efficient landscape improvements. Reclamation and revegetation can use a historical perspective to determine what biota will be able to sustain large populations without threatening native biota of the landscape.

A tropical forest in particular needs to be studied extensively because it is a highly diverse, heterogeneous setting. Historical ecology can use archaeological sites within this setting to study past successes and failures of indigenous peoples. The use of swidden fires in Laos is an example of historical ecology as used by current land managers in policy-making. Swidden fires were originally considered a source of habitat degradation. This conclusion led the Laos government to discourage farmers from using swidden fires as a farming technique. However, recent research has found that swidden fires were practiced historically in Laos and were not, in fact, the source of degradation. Similar research revealed that habitat degradation originated from a population increase after the Vietnam War. The greater volume of people compelled the government to put pressure on farmers for increased agricultural production. Land managers no longer automatically eliminate the use of swidden fires, but rather the number of swidden fires that are set for government-sponsored agricultural purposes.

The San Francisco Estuary Institute uses historical ecology to study human impacts on the California landscape to guide environmental management. A study of the wetlands of Elkhorn Slough near Monterey, California, sought to enhance conservation and restoration activities. By using historical data such as maps, charts, and aerial photographs, researchers were able to trace habitat change to built structures that had negatively altered the tidal flow into the estuaries dating from the early 1900s. The study further suggested using techniques that "imitate the complex structure of natural tidal wetlands and maintain connectivity with intact wetland habitats as well as with adjoining subtidal and upland habitats."

== See also ==
- Cultural ecology
- Ecosystem
- Ethnobiology
- Human ecology
- Landscape
- Restoration ecology
- Time geography
- Paleoecology
