= Tembé =

Indigenous people in the Brazilian states of Amazonas and Pará

Tembé Tenetehara
Total population
- 1,502 (2010)

Regions with significant populations
- Brazil (Amazonas, Pará)

Languages
- Tembé

Religion
- Traditional tribal religion

Related ethnic groups
- Guajajara

The Tembé, also Timbé and Tenetehara, are an Indigenous people of Brazil, living along the Maranhão and Gurupi Rivers, in the state of Amazonas and Pará. Their lands have been encroached and settled by farmers and loggers, who do so illegally, and the Tembé are working to expel the intruders from their territories.

== Name ==
The Tembé call themselves Tenetehara, which means "people," or more specifically the Tenetehara people, of which the Tembé are the western subgroup and the Guajajara are the eastern subgroup. "Tembé" is thought to come from a neighboring tribe's word, timbeb, which means "flat nose."

== Language ==
Tembé people speak the Tembé language, a Tupi-Guarani language. It is mutually intelligible with the Guajajára language.
