= Matanawí language =

Extinct divergent language of Brazil

Matanawí
- Matanauí, Mitandua, Moutoniway
- Pronunciation: [matanawˈɨ]
- Native to: Brazil
- Region: Amazonas
- Era: attested 1925
- Language family: Language isolate (Mura–Matanawi ?)

Language codes
- ISO 639-3: None (mis)
- Glottolog: mata1275

Matanawí (Matanauí, Mitandua, Moutoniway) is an extinct divergent Amazonian language isolate that may be distantly related to the Muran languages. It was originally spoken on the Castanha River and Madeirinha River in Amazonas State.

== Vocabulary ==
English	Matanawí
rainbow	turusiˈkabm
Madeira River (not a Toponyms in Matanawi)	kajaˈri
Marmelos River (not a Toponyms in Matanawi)	piruaˈri
canoe	anawˈa
oar	huˈra
Tipity	tipiˈti
path	aã
knife	juimã
hunting arch	parəˈa
strainer/filter	manaˈri
Lagenaria bowl for herbs	oˈᴐ
Matanawi	matanawˈɨ
Urupá	ʧʊakʊbm
Parintintín (a neighbor tribe)	tapakaˈra itoĕbeˈhẽ
black	mɨrɨbm / mɨˈrebn
Jarú	jaˈru
Mura people	muˈra
Mura people from Rio Branco, Acre?	jaˈhahĩ
Tamandua tetradactyla (anteater)	wiʃoˈho
Brown howler	uruˈrem / ʊruˈrəhm
parrot	awuˈru
hen	pataˈri
chameleon	ʦɨnɨˈmί
turtle	jawaˈri
Proceratophrys cururu (only word for frog)?	turuˈru
Pseudoplatystoma (catfish)	urukʊˈta / urukuˈta
Cichla ocellaris (butterfly peacock bass or Cichlid)	pariˈta / parɨˈta
ant	pakiˈpi
bee	mawˈɨ / horohoˈrᴐ
Enterolobium contortisiliquum (pacara earpod tree)	kuiˈmã iː / koiˈmɨ
head	apa zɨ
knee	atura paʃi jɨ
skin	uhᴐ zɨ
breast / chest?	mapã mətᴐ
blood	mɨĩ
heart	miʃi ta
firewood	uaː
smoke	ua risi
sky	rito
night	jamãru
ax	jaʃi
man	papɑ́
woman	mapɨwã
snake	ija
fish	mami
tree	ɨ
cotton	wakɨsi
red	awu zɨ

Comparison between Matanawí language and Pirahã:

English	Matanawí	Pirahã/Múra-Pirahã
language	ihuzɨ	ipopaj
lips	ɲaruzɨohᴐ	apipaj
ear	atahuzɨ	apopaj
hair	apa zi jaa	apapataj
thigh	aritʊzɨ, aritᴐzi	akuapaj
mouth	ɲaru zɨ	kaopaj
tooth	arɨzɨ	atopaj
nose	natuzi	itopaj
eye	tuʃiji	kupaj
arm	apiji	atoewe
hand	ũsu zɨ	upaj
nail (hand nail, singular)	ũsuzɨhᴐ	upapaj
leg	aturazɨ	ipopaj
foot	iʃijɨ	apaj
water	apɨ	pe
fire	ua	wai
rain	apɨ	pe
moon	ka	kahaiai
earth / soil?	wɨsa	bege
stone/rock	aja	aapuuj
sun	viː	wese
home/house	pi	ataj
net (probably fishing net, rede in Portuguese has many meanings)	api	apiʃara
arrow/dart	awɨ	apoahaj
comb	parata	isowe
belt	kɨnũ	pahoese
pan/pot	wata	waaj
sticks for making fire	ɨ	ie
honey	ʦɨza	ahaj
corn	iwari	tihuahaj
Manihot esculenta/Yuca/Cassava	mĩ	iʃehe
Tobacco	ɨsəki	iʧehe

=== Nimuendajú (1925) ===
A few words collected by Curt Nimuendajú in 1922, from Indian João Comprido (resident in Surupy, Lower Marmelos River), are given below

==== Toponyms ====
English	Matanawi
Madeira River	kayarí
Marmelos River	piruarí
Branco River	apɨ wakɨramĩ
Aripuanã River	yaʊʃí

==== Ethnonyms ====
Portuguese	Matanawi
white	tʃuenayã́, tʃueanã́
Indian	rɨnĩ́ isã́
Matanawi	matanawɨ́
Urupá	tʃʊakʊbm, tuwikə́m
Arára (from Aripuanã River)	pik.ód
Múra-Piraha	piriaháĩ
Parintintin	tapakará; itoẽbehẽ́
Tribe from Paxiuba River (Aripuanã River)	tupiokón
Tribe from Aripuanã River	apiyipã́
black	mɨrɨ́bm, mɨrébn
angry indian (?) "indio bravo"	rɨnĩ amarizɨ́
Torá	tʊrá, turá
Jaru	yarú
Arára (Preto River)	mará
Múra	murá
Múra from (Branco River)	yaháhĩ
anthropophagic tribe in the headwaters of Preto River (Machado River)	koʃurái
Munduruku/Wuy Jugu	paiʃí

==== Animals ====
English	Matanawi
Robust capuchin monkey	hotó, hotɔ
Spider monkey	wapɨ́
puma	matuyaá awɨtamɨ̃
otter	trarɨá
Tayassu pecari (pig)	rɨwã́, riwɑ̃́
South American tapir	awiyã́, awiyá
Lowland paca	uã́
Chiroptera (bat)	wawá
lesser anteater	wiʃohó
maned sloth	tahɔrɨ́
tail	piyɨ́
howler monkey	ʊrurə́bm, ururém
jaguar	matuyaá
dog	matú, mató
red brocket deer	manyɔ
collared peccary	mã́
capybara	muitá
agouti	amisí
giant anteater	yawarí
armadillo	kasearí
bird	wiʃá
egg	iyɔ
hawk	ihasɨ́
vulture	pipí
red-and-green macaw	ã
parrot	awurú
bare-faced curassow	iwɨ
guan	papasɨ, papasí
wing	ihɔ
feather	yaá
harpy eagle	ihasɨ wanĩ
king vulture	pipi wakɨ ramɨ̃
blue-and-yellow macaw	pará
duck	urumã́
Belem curassow	iwí ari
chicken	patarí
snake	iyá
boa constrictor	ɨrɨ́pɨrán
anaconda	atupiyá
pit viper	katiti
caiman	yipá
chameleon	cɨnɨmɨ̃
tortoise	yawarí
tegu	apɨsɨ́
turtle	paʃaʃá
toad	tururú
fish	mamĩ, mamí
stingray	iwahʊ, iwahó
knifefish	nopapá
pacu	tasí
piranha	tʃipearɨ́, ʃipiarí
catfish	urukʊtá, urukutá
peacock bass	paritá, parɨtá
wolf fish	tamɨ̃
flea	iʃó
mosquito	ĩ
honey	cɨzá, cɨsá
spider	wirisɨ́
ant	pakipí
millipede	wararáu
louse	ɨʃɨ́, ɨsɨ́
bee	mawɨ́, horohorɔ́
wasp	manɨ̃
butterfly	pipiyá
termite	kaiwã́, kaĩwã́
earthworm	yawɨsɨ́

==== Plants ====
English	Matanawi
tree	ɨ
field	rarɨhú
flower	rʊãʃí
peel	ɨũhɔ, ɨuŋhó
Brazil nut tree	tʃipɨɨ́
bacaba palm	touã́
bamboo	tawà
corn	iwarí
manioc	mĩ
yam	apɨtɔ
annatto	aí, ái
tobacco	ɨsəkɨ́, iʃəki
banana	iwá
bush	ʊ̃
leaf	ɨ yaá
fruit	rʊasí
root	ɨ iʃí
açaí palm	ɨrám
arrow cane	tʃiwaɨ́
fish poison vine	koimɨ́, kuimã́; ĩ
potato	kaĩuã́, kayuã́
cotton	wakɨsí
pepper	iʃihó
