= Mura-Matanawi languages =

Proposed language family of Brazil

Mura–Matanawí
- (proposed)
- Geographic distribution: Amazonas, Brazil
- Ethnicity: Mura, Matanawí
- Linguistic classification: Proposed language family
- Subdivisions: Mura; Matanawí †

Language codes
- Glottolog: None
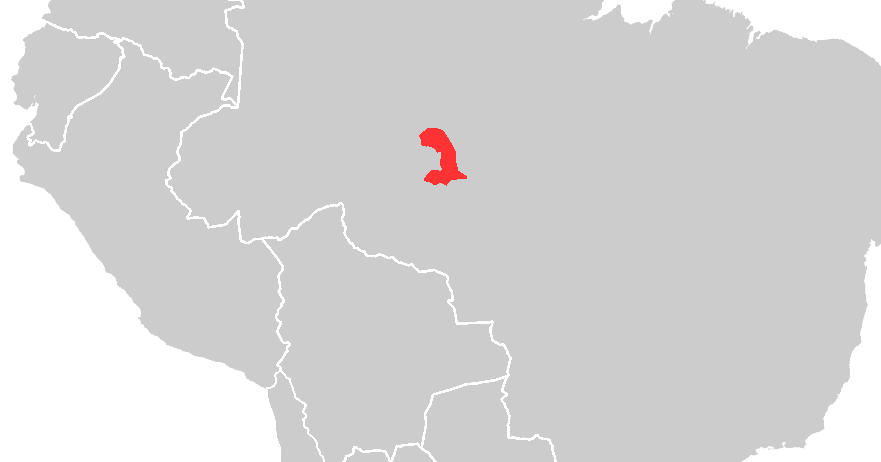
- Distribution of the Mura and Matanawi languages

The Mura-Matanawí languages are a proposed language grouping consisting of the Mura language (with the Pirahã dialect) and extinct Matanawí. Glottolog evaluates it as "promising" but does not rule out chance for the similarities. The family was first proposed by Curt Nimuendajú in 1922.

== Language contact ==
For the Mura-Matanawi languages, Jolkesky (2016) notes that there are lexical similarities with the Kwaza, Taruma, Katukina-Katawixi, Arawak, Jeoromitxi, Tupi, and Arawa language families due to contact.

== Comparison ==
Comparison of basic vocabulary in Matanawí and Mura-Pirahã by Diego Valio Antunes Alves (2019: 86), with data of both languages cited from Curt Nimuendajú (1925):

Portuguese gloss (original)	English gloss (translated)	Matanawí	Mura-Pirahã
língua	tongue	ihuzɨ	ipopaj
lábio	lip	ɲaruzɨohᴐ	apipaj
orelha	ear	atahuzɨ	apopaj
cabelo	hair	apa zi jaa	apapataj
coxa	thigh	aritʊzɨ, aritᴐzi	akuapaj
boca	mouth	ɲaru zɨ	kaopaj
dente	tooth	arɨzɨ	atopaj
nariz	nose	natuzi	itopaj
olho	eye	tuʃiji	kupaj
braço	arm	apiji	atoewe
mão	hand	ũsu zɨ	upaj
unha da mão	fingernail	ũsuzɨhᴐ	upapaj
perna	leg	aturazɨ	ipopaj
pé	foot	iʃijɨ	apaj
água	water	apɨ	pe
fogo	fire	ua	wai
chuva	rain	apɨ	pe
lua	moon	ka	kahaiai
terra	earth	wɨsa	bege
pedra	stone	aja	aapuuj
sol	sun	viː	wese
casa	house	pi	ataj
rede	net	api	apiʃara
flecha	arrow	awɨ	apoahaj
pente	comb	parata	isowe
esteira	mat	kɨnũ	pahoese
panela	pan	wata	waaj
paus para produzir fogo	sticks for starting fire	ɨ	ie
mel	honey	ʦɨza	ahaj
milho	maize	iwari	tihuahaj
mandioca	manioc	mĩ	iʃehe
tabaco	tobacco	ɨsəki	iʧehe

== Sources ==
- Lindsay, Robert (2021). "Forschungsbericht: Review of Campbell & Mixco "A Glossary of Historical Linguistics". Mother Tongue. 23 (1): 55–150.
