= Holtville, California =

City in California, United States

City of Holtville
- City
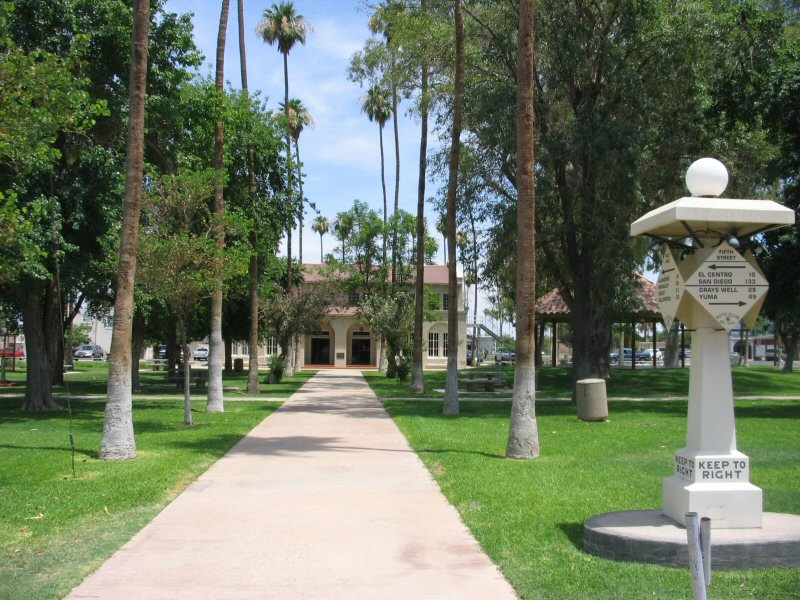
- Holtville City Hall

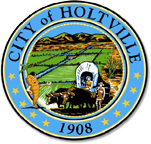
- Seal
- Motto: "The Carrot Capital of the World"
- Interactive map of City of Holtville
- Location in Southern California Location in California Location in the United States
- Coordinates: 32°48′40″N 115°22′49″W
- Country: United States
- State: California
- County: Imperial
- Incorporated: July 1, 1908

Area
  - Total: 1.16 sq mi (3.00 km^{2})
  - Land: 1.15 sq mi (2.99 km^{2})
  - Water: 0.0039 sq mi (0.01 km^{2}) 0.40%
- Elevation: −9.8 ft (−3 m)

Population (2020)
  - Total: 5,605
  - Density: 4,860/sq mi (1,870/km^{2})
- Time zone: UTC-8 (Pacific (PST))
  - Summer (DST): UTC-7 (PDT)
- ZIP code: 92250
- Area codes: 442/760
- FIPS code: 06-34246
- GNIS feature IDs: 1660761, 2410780
- Website: www.holtville.ca.gov

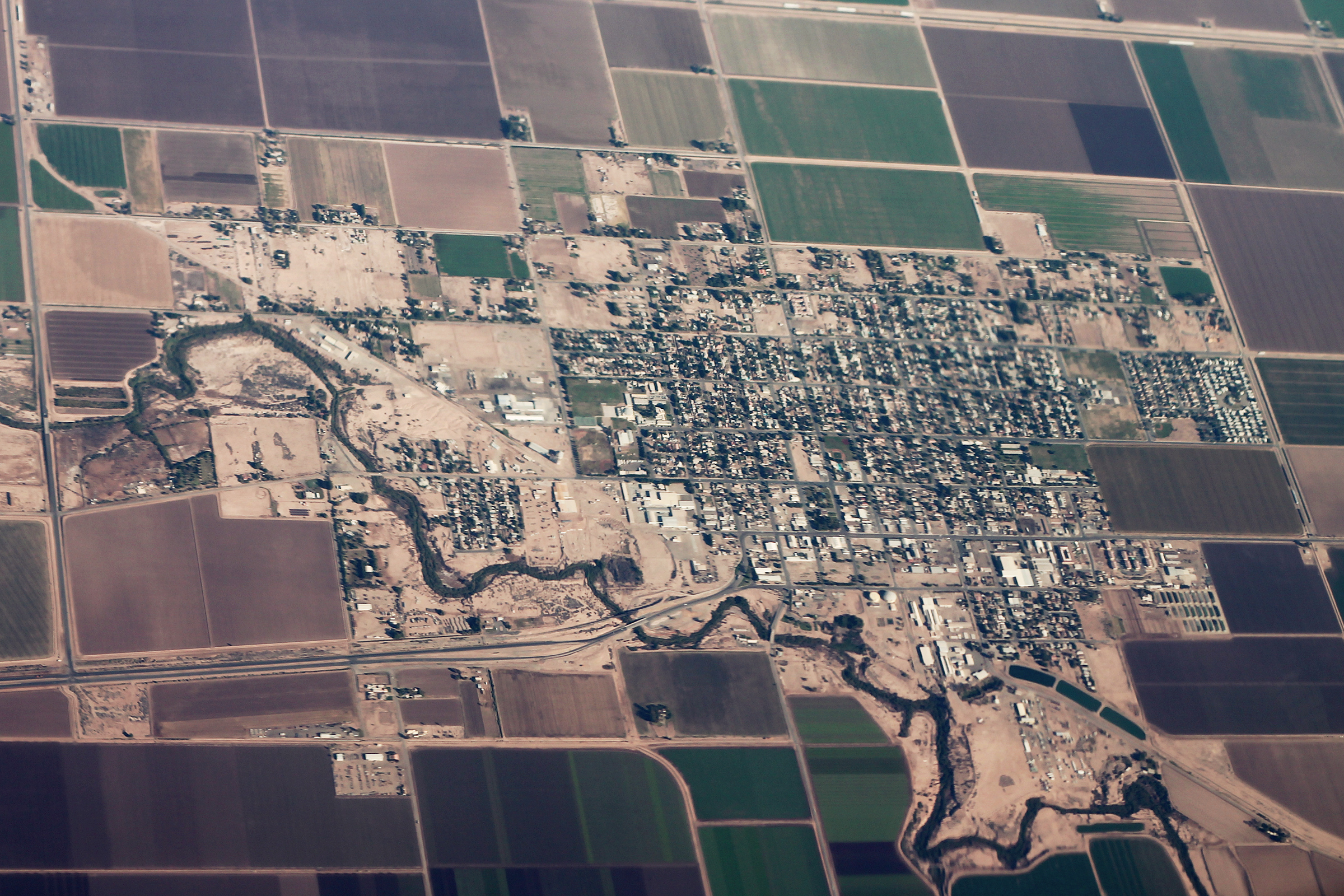
Holtville, California - Aerial

Holtville (formerly Holton) is a city in Imperial County, California. Holtville is located 10.5 miles (17 km) east of El Centro. The population was 5,605 at the 2020 census, down from 5,939 in 2010.

== History ==
The city was founded in the 1880s by Swiss-German settlers, many of whom entered from Mexico. The construction of railroads in the 1890s, the All-American Canal in the late 1940s, and U.S. Route 80 in the 1920s (later converted to Interstate 8 in the 1970s) and the North American Free Trade Agreement (NAFTA) economic boom in the 1990s brought more people to Holtville and the Imperial Valley.

The city of Holtville, which was originally called Holton, was founded in 1903 by W.F. Holt, and incorporated on June 20, 1908. The name was changed to Holtville due to a request by the U. S. Postal Service because the name Holton sounded too much like Colton (in San Bernardino County), the regional headquarters of the Southern Pacific Railroad at the time. The name honors W.F. Holt, founder of the community.

The city lies on the northeast bank of the Alamo River, one of two rivers that flow north from Mexico into Imperial County.

On March 2, 2021, 13 people were killed just outside of town when an SUV carrying 25 people collided with a semi-truck and trailer.

== Geography ==
According to the United States Census Bureau, the city has a total area of 1.16 sq mi (3.0 km^{2}), with 1.15 square miles land and 0.40% water.

=== Climate ===
This area has a large amount of sunshine year round due to its stable descending air and high pressure. According to the Köppen Climate Classification system, Holtville has a desert climate, abbreviated "Bwh" on climate maps.

== Demographics ==
Historical population
| Census | Pop. | Note | %± |
|---|---|---|---|
| 1910 | 729 | | — |
| 1920 | 1,347 | | 84.8% |
| 1930 | 1,758 | | 30.5% |
| 1940 | 1,772 | | 0.8% |
| 1950 | 2,472 | | 39.5% |
| 1960 | 3,080 | | 24.6% |
| 1970 | 3,496 | | 13.5% |
| 1980 | 4,399 | | 25.8% |
| 1990 | 4,820 | | 9.6% |
| 2000 | 5,612 | | 16.4% |
| 2010 | 5,939 | | 5.8% |
| 2020 | 5,605 | | −5.6% |
U.S. Decennial Census

=== 2020 census ===
As of the 2020 census, Holtville had a population of 5,605. The population density was 4,857.0 inhabitants per square mile (1,875.3/km^{2}).

The age distribution was 26.5% under the age of 18, 9.3% aged 18 to 24, 24.1% aged 25 to 44, 23.4% aged 45 to 64, and 16.8% aged 65 or older. The median age was 36.4 years. For every 100 females, there were 92.7 males, and for every 100 females age 18 and over, there were 90.1 males age 18 and over.

Racial composition as of the 2020 census
| Race | Number | Percent |
|---|---|---|
| White | 1,719 | 30.7% |
| Black or African American | 32 | 0.6% |
| American Indian and Alaska Native | 72 | 1.3% |
| Asian | 38 | 0.7% |
| Native Hawaiian and Other Pacific Islander | 2 | 0.0% |
| Some other race | 2,253 | 40.2% |
| Two or more races | 1,489 | 26.6% |
| Hispanic or Latino (of any race) | 4,763 | 85.0% |

There were 1,709 households, of which 44.4% had children under the age of 18 living in them. Of all households, 55.5% were married-couple households, 3.6% were cohabiting couple households, 13.7% had a male householder with no spouse or partner present, and 27.2% had a female householder with no spouse or partner present. About 17.0% of households were made up of individuals and 9.9% had someone living alone who was 65 years of age or older. There were 1,358 families (79.5% of all households).

The census reported that 98.3% of the population lived in households, 1.7% lived in non-institutionalized group quarters, and no one was institutionalized. Holtville was 100.0% urban and 0.0% rural.

There were 1,793 housing units, of which 4.7% were vacant. Of occupied units, 55.4% were owner-occupied and 44.6% were renter-occupied. The homeowner vacancy rate was 0.6% and the rental vacancy rate was 3.6%.

=== Income and poverty ===
In 2023, the US Census Bureau estimated that the median household income was $63,438, and the per capita income was $22,831. About 14.4% of families and 14.4% of the population were below the poverty line.

=== 2010 census ===
At the 2010 census Holtville had a population of 5,939. The population density was 5,152.0 inhabitants per square mile (1,989.2/km^{2}). The racial makeup of Holtville was 3,655 (61.5%) White, 37 (0.6%) African American, 41 (0.7%) Native American, 50 (0.8%) Asian, 4 (0.1%) Pacific Islander, 1,977 (33.3%) from other races, and 175 (2.9%) from two or more races. Hispanic or Latino of any race were 4,858 persons (81.8%).

The whole population lived in households, no one lived in non-institutionalized group quarters and no one was institutionalized.

There were 1,799 households, 894 (49.7%) had children under the age of 18 living in them, 1,033 (57.4%) were opposite-sex married couples living together, 290 (16.1%) had a female householder with no husband present, 106 (5.9%) had a male householder with no wife present. There were 81 (4.5%) unmarried opposite-sex partnerships, and 6 (0.3%) same-sex married couples or partnerships. 319 households (17.7%) were one person and 164 (9.1%) had someone living alone who was 65 or older. The average household size was 3.30. There were 1,429 families (79.4% of households); the average family size was 3.72.

The age distribution was 1,850 people (31.2%) under the age of 18, 618 people (10.4%) aged 18 to 24, 1,327 people (22.3%) aged 25 to 44, 1,416 people (23.8%) aged 45 to 64, and 728 people (12.3%) who were 65 or older. The median age was 32.1 years. For every 100 females, there were 93.5 males. For every 100 females age 18 and over, there were 89.2 males.

There were 1,937 housing units at an average density of 1,680.3 per square mile (648.8/km^{2}), of which 1,799 were occupied, 904 (50.3%) by the owners and 895 (49.7%) by renters. The homeowner vacancy rate was 1.6%; the rental vacancy rate was 6.5%. 3,017 people (50.8% of the population) lived in owner-occupied housing units and 2,922 people (49.2%) lived in rental housing units.

== Arts and culture ==
=== Annual cultural events ===
The city's major civic event is the annual Carrot Festival, held in late January or early February. It usually features a parade, a carnival and other activities over a 10-day period. Holtville was famous in the mid 20th century with having the Holtville "Carrot Festival" but was confused with the "Coachella Valley" name from the Bugs Bunny cartoon Bully for Bugs when he reads a map seeking a "Carrot Festival".

== Government ==
In the state legislature, Holtville is in the 18th senatorial district, represented by Democrat Steve Padilla, and the 36th Assembly district, represented by Republican Jeff Gonzalez.

Federally, Holtville is in California's 25th congressional district, represented by Democrat Raul Ruiz.

History was made during the election cycle of 2006, when voters elected Lisa Bianca Padilla, who thus became the first female Hispanic candidate ever to win a seat on the city council.

== Media ==
A weekly newspaper, The Holtville Tribune, is distributed by mail and newsstand in the Holtville area. Its circulation is about 3,750. The daily newspaper, the Imperial Valley Press in El Centro, has circulation at over 20,000.

== Infrastructure ==
=== Transportation ===
The old U.S. Route 80 once ran along Fifth Street through the center of town. A small obelisk in Holt Park, just north of Fifth Street, gives the distances to various points to the north, east and west. U.S. Route 80 has been decommissioned and made as County Route S80 in California. The portion in and near Holtville is now part of State Route 115.

Much of the east–west automobile traffic has been diverted to Interstate 8, about 2.5 miles to the south. Holtville is easily accessible through the Orchard Road interchange. The newly constructed State Route 7 connects Holtville with the factories and industrial areas of Mexicali, Baja California, Mexico.

The city was once joined by railroad to El Centro, but this line (nicknamed the "Holton Interurban"), and another railroad line going to the north, have been abandoned. The closure of the railroad station brought economic decline to the town in the late 20th century.

=== Police Department ===
The city formerly had its own police force, but police protection is now provided by the Imperial County Sheriff's Department.

=== Utilities ===
The city provides its own water and sewer service. Trash services are provided by CR&R. Other utility providers for Holtville are Southern California Gas, Imperial Irrigation District, AT&T California, and Spectrum.

=== Pete Mellinger Alamo River Trail ===
A trail was constructed in the 2010s that begins along Evan Hewes Highway and ends at the Holtville Skatepark. The trail was dedicated to former city planning commissioner, Pete Mellinger.

== In literature ==
The 1926 silent film The Winning of Barbara Worth, based on the 1911 novel of that name, was set and then filmed in the area. The city was featured in Milton J. Silverman's bestselling novel "Open and Shut," which chronicled the true crime story of Norma Winters, a Holtville resident who contracted for the death of her husband during the summer of 1974.

== Notable people ==
- Daniel Everett (born 1951), American linguist known for his study of the Amazon Basin's Pirahã people and their language, was born and raised in Holtville.
- George E. Brown Jr. (1920–99), U.S. Member of Congress (1962–70, 1972–99) known for his support for civil rights, science and space exploration, public schools and higher education, and environmental protection and his opposition to the Vietnam War, was born and spent his early years in Holtville.

== See also ==
- San Diego–Imperial, California
- El Centro Metropolitan Area
