= Pirahan =

Pirahan may refer to:

- Pirahan, or perahan, a garment worn in Iran and parts of South Asia; it is a component of the perahan tunban
- Pirahã people, an indigenous people of Brazil
- Pirahã language, their language
