= Phonological Analysis: A Functional Approach =

Linguistics textbook

Phonological Analysis: a Functional Approach
- Author: Donald A. Burquest
- Language: English
- Subject: phonology
- Publisher: SIL International
- Publication date: 1993 (1st ed)
- Media type: Print (hardcover)
- Pages: 319
- ISBN: 9781556711688

Phonological Analysis: a Functional Approach is a book by Donald A. Burquest designed for an introductory course in phonology.

== Reception ==
The book was reviewed by Daniel L. Everett and Paul D. Fallon
