= Keren Madora =

American missionary and linguist

Keren Everett
- Born: Keren Madora Graham
- Known for: Pirahã language proficiency
- Spouse: Daniel Everett
- Children: Caleb Everett

Keren Madora Everett (née Graham) is an American linguist and Christian missionary. Everett has spent years in the Amazon studying the Pirahã tribe and their language.

== Career ==
The Pirahã language is of interest to linguists, but only a few people apart from the Pirahã are fluent in it. Everett's ex-husband Daniel is the best-known authority on the language. Everett herself made breakthroughs with the prosody of Pirahã.

They discovered that Pirahã does not have a traditional concept of numbers or mathematics.

They lived among the Pirahã from 1978 to 1983 and from 1999 to 2002. Following their separation in 2005, Keren returned to Brazil where she continued her missionary work among the Pirahã.

== Personal life ==
In 2005, after Daniel Everett informed Keren of his atheism, the two divorced. They had three children together, including Caleb Everett.

== Publications ==
- Keren M. Everett, "The acoustic correlates of stress in Piraha". Journal of Amazonian Languages vol.1 no.2, pp. 104–162. March 1998.
- Daniel L. Everett and Keren M. Everett, "On the relevance of Syllable Onsets to Stress Placement." Linguistic Inquiry vol. 15, pp. 705–711. 1984.
