= Steven N. Sheldon =

American linguist

Steven N. Sheldon was the Executive Director of SIL International from 1992 to 2000.

He is known to the linguistics community for his field work and documentation of the Pirahã language. His 1988 paper on the Pirahã verb system is still the basic (if not the only) reference on that subject.

== Publications ==
- Steven N. Sheldon (1974) Some morphophonemic and tone perturbation rules in Mura-Pirahã. International Journal of American Linguistics, v. 40 279–282.
- Steven N. Sheldon (1988) Os sufixos verbais Mura-Pirahã (= Mura-Pirahã verbal suffixes). SIL International, Série Lingüística Nº 9, Vol. 2: 147–175. In Portuguese PDF.
