= Mura language =

Indigenous language of Brazil

Mura
- bhũrai-ada, bohuarai-arasé
- Native to: Brazil
- Region: Amazonas
- Ethnicity: 1,500 Mura people (1995)
- Native speakers: (360 cited 2000) mostly monolingual
- Language family: Mura–Matanawi ?: Mura
- Dialects: Mura proper †; Pirahã; Bohurá †; Yahahí † (unattested)
- Writing system: Latin script

Official status
- Official language in: Brazil (Amazonas)

Language codes
- ISO 639-3: myp Pirahã (Mura)
- Glottolog: pira1253

Mura is a language of Amazonas, Brazil. It is most famous for Pirahã, its sole surviving dialect. Linguistically, it is typified by agglutinativity, a very small phoneme inventory (around 11 compared to around 44 in English), whistled speech, the use of tone, and a very limited, perception-based numeral system. In the 19th century, there were an estimated 30,000–60,000 Mura speakers. It is now spoken by only 300 Pirahã people in eight villages.

== Classification ==
Mura is often proposed to be related to Matanawí. Kaufman (1994) also suggests a connection with Huarpe in his Macro-Warpean proposal.

== Dialects ==
Since at least Barboza Rodrigues (1892), there have been three ethnic names commonly listed as dialects of Mura, or even as Muran languages. The names are:

- Bohurá, or Buxwaray, the original form of the name 'Mura'; spoken on the Autaz River
- Pirahã, or Pirahá, Pirahán, the name the remaining dialect goes by
- Yahahí, also spelled Jahahi; spoken on the Branco River (unattested)

On the basis of a minuscule amount of data, it would appear that Bohurá (Mura proper) was mutually intelligible with Pirahã; however, for Yahahí there exists only ethnographic information, and it can be assumed they spoke the same language as other Mura. Rodrigues describes the Yahahí as having come from the Branco river, a tributary of the right bank of the upper Marmelos river. The last Yahahí are said to have joined the Pirahã.

The Mura/Bohurá endonym is Buhuraen, according to Barboza Rodrigues (1892), or Buxivaray ~ Buxwarahay, according to Tastevin (1923). This was pronounced Murá by their neighbors, the Torá and Matanawi. In his vocabulary, Rodrigues lists Bohura for the people and bhũrai-ada "Mura language" for the language, from the Mura of the Manicoré River; Tastevin has Bohurai and bohuarai-arasé for the same. They also record,

nahi buxwara araha "That one is Mura"
yane abahi araha buxwarái "We are all Mura"

== Vocabulary ==
Below is a comparison of Mura and Pirahã words from Salles (2023):

English gloss	Mura	Pirahã
long	peissí	piiʔi
short	kutjúhi	koihí
big	itokúi	itohí
male foreigner	auí	aooí
female foreigner	aurí	aogí
wild pig	bahúis	bahóisi
louse	tihyhí	tihíihi
flour	arais	ágaísi
tobacco	itíhi	tíhi
leaf	itai	tai
fire	uái	hoái
blood	bê	bií
bone	ái	aí
sleep	aitáhus	aitáhoi
die	kwoabís	koabaipí
drink	pitaissa	pitáipí
stay	abaái	abí
say	aihyahá	ahoái
sun	huisí	hisó
moon	kaãnhê	kaháíʔái
cold	arí	agí
feisty	aupís	aáopí
far	kái	kaáo
bad	babihí	baábi(hi)

== Bibliography ==
- Campbell, Lyle. (1997). American Indian languages: The historical linguistics of Native America. New York: Oxford University Press. ISBN 0-19-509427-1.
- Everett, D. L. (1992). A língua Pirahã e a teoria da sintaxe: descrição, perspectivas e teoria. Campinas: Editora da Unicamp.
- Hanke, W. (1950a). O idioma Mura. Arquivos: Coletânea de documentor para a História da Amazônia, 12:3-8.
- Hanke, W. (1950b). Vocabulário e idioma mura dos índios mura do rio Manicoré. Arquivos, 12:3-8.
- Heinrichs, A. (1961). Questionário: Mura-Pirahã Rio Marmelos. (Questionário dos Vocabulários Padrões para estudos comparativos preliminares de línguas indígenas brasileiras.) Rio de Janeiro: Museu Nacional.
- Heinrichs, A. (1963). Questionário: Mura-Pirahã Rios Marmelos e Maici. (Questionário dos Vocabulários Padrões para estudos comparativos preliminares de línguas indígenas brasileiras.) Rio de Janeiro: Museu Nacional.
- Kaufman, Terrence (1994). "The native languages of South America". In Moseley, Christopher; Asher, Ronald E. (eds.). Atlas of the world's languages. London: Routledge. p. 67. ISBN 978-0-415-01925-5.
- Curt Nimuendajú (1948): "The Mura" and "The Yahahi", in Handbook of South American Indians, Volume 3: The Tropical Forest Tribes, ed. Julian H. Steward, pp. 255–269.
