= Daniel Everett =

American linguist and author (born 1951)

- Born: Daniel Leonard Everett; July 26, 1951 (age 75); Holtville, California, U.S.
- Education: University of Campinas (MA, PhD)
- Children: Caleb Everett (son)
- Scientific career
- Fields: Linguistics, anthropology, tacit cognition
- Workplaces: University of Pittsburgh; Bentley University
- Thesis: A Lingua Pirahã e Teoria da Sintaxe (1983)
- Doctoral advisor: Charlotte Galves

Daniel Leonard Everett (born July 26, 1951) is an American linguist and author best known for his study of the Amazon basin's Pirahã people and their language.

As of 2026, Everett is a professor of sociology at Bentley University in Waltham, Massachusetts. From July 1, 2010, to June 30, 2018, Everett served as Dean of Arts and Sciences at Bentley. Prior to Bentley University, Everett was chair of the Department of Languages, Literatures and Cultures at Illinois State University in Normal, Illinois. He has taught at the University of Manchester and is former chair of the Linguistics Department of the University of Pittsburgh.

== Early life ==
Everett was raised near the Mexican border in Holtville, California. His father was an occasional cowboy, mechanic, and construction worker. His mother was a waitress at a local restaurant. Everett played in rock bands from the time he was 11 years old until converting to Christianity at age 17, after meeting missionaries Al and Sue Graham in San Diego, California.

At age 18, Everett married the daughter of these missionaries, Keren Graham. He completed a diploma in Foreign Missions from the Moody Bible Institute of Chicago in 1975. Daniel and Keren Everett subsequently enrolled in the Summer Institute of Linguistics (now SIL International), which trains missionaries in field linguistics so that they can translate the Bible into various world languages.

Because Everett, by his own account, quickly demonstrated a gift for language, he was invited to study Pirahã, which previous SIL missionaries had, according to Everett, failed to learn in 20 years of study. In 1977, after four months of jungle training and three semesters of courses in linguistic analysis, translation principles, and literacy development, the couple and their three children moved to Brazil, where they studied Portuguese for a year before moving to a Pirahã village at the mouth of the Maici River in the Lowland Amazonia region. Since 1999, Everett's stays in the jungle have included a generator-powered freezer, and a large video and DVD collection. Regarding the topic, Everett said that "After twenty years of living like a Pirahã, I'd had it with roughing it."

== Education in linguistics ==
Everett had some initial success learning the language, but when SIL lost their contract with the Brazilian government, he enrolled in the fall of 1978 at the University of Campinas in Brazil, under the auspices of which he could continue to study Pirahã. Everett focused on the theories of Noam Chomsky. His master's thesis, "Aspectos da Fonologia do Pirahã," was written under the direction of Aryon Rodrigues, one of the leading experts on Amazonian languages. It was completed in 1980. His PhD dissertation, "A Lingua Pirahã e Teoria da Sintaxe," completed in 1983, was written under the direction of Charlotte Galves. This dissertation provided a detailed Chomskyan analysis of Pirahã.

On one of his research missions in 1993, Everett was the first to document the Oro Win language, one of the few languages in the world to use the rare voiceless dental bilabially trilled affricate (phonetically, [t̪͡ʙ̥]).

== Work ==
=== Amazonian and other American languages ===
Everett has conducted field research on many Amazonian languages, focusing on their phonetics (sound production), phonology (sound structures), morphology (word structures), syntax (sentence structures), discourse structures and content (how people communicate culturally relevant information by stories), pragmatics (how language is constrained by some social settings), ethnolinguistics (how culture affects linguistic forms), historical linguistics (the reconstruction of the origin and dispersion of languages by comparing data from other languages), among other areas. He has published a grammar of the Wari' language (with Barbara Kern), a grammar of Pirahã, and grammar sketches of other languages.

=== Aspectos da Fonologia do Pirahã ===
Everett's 1979 Universidade Estadual de Campinas master's thesis on the sound system of Piraha, from articulatory phonetics to prosody (e.g. intonation, tone, and stress placement).

=== A Língua Pirahã e a Teoria da Sintaxe ===
This was Everett's 1983 Sc.D. dissertation at the Universidade Estadual de Campinas (UNICAMP) and is still the most comprehensive statement of Pirahã grammar available. Everett has revised many of his analyses of the language in the intervening years and is planning a much more comprehensive grammar with detailed discourse studies in the coming years.

=== Wari': The Pacaas-Novos Language of Western Brazil ===
This 540-page grammar of the Wari' language was a ten-year project that was undertaken by Everett and the New Tribes Missionary Barbara Kern, who has worked among the Wari' since 1962 and is perhaps the most fluent non-Wari' speaker of the language.

=== Universal grammar ===
Everett eventually concluded that Chomsky's ideas about universal grammar, and the universality of recursion in particular (at least understood in terms of self-embedded structures), are falsified by Pirahã. His 2005 article in Current Anthropology, entitled "Cultural Constraints on Grammar and Cognition in Pirahã", has caused a controversy in the field of linguistics. Chomsky called Everett a "charlatan", and said that even if Pirahã had all the properties described by Everett, there would be no implications for universal grammar. "Everett hopes that readers will not understand the difference between UG in the technical sense (the theory of the genetic component of human language) and in the informal sense, which concerns properties common to all languages". The June 2009 issue of the Journal of the Linguistic Society of America, Language, contains a nearly 100-page debate between Everett and some of his principal critics.

=== Don't Sleep, There Are Snakes: Life and Language in the Amazonian Jungle ===
In November 2008, Everett's book on the culture and language of the Pirahã people, and what it was like to live among them, was published in the United Kingdom by Profile Books and in the United States by Pantheon Books. Blackwell's booksellers in the UK selected this as one of the best books of 2009 in the UK. National Public Radio selected it as one of the best books of 2009 in the US. Translations have appeared in German, French, and Korean, and others are due to appear in 2010 in Thai, and Mandarin. It is mainly about doing scientific field research and the discoveries that this has led to about the grammar and culture of the Pirahã people.

Don't Sleep, There Are Snakes was runner-up for the 2008 award for adult non-fiction from the Society of Midland Authors.

=== Language: The Cultural Tool ===
This book develops an alternative to the view that language is innate. It argues that language is, like the bow and arrow, a tool to solve a common human problem, the need to communicate efficiently and effectively.

=== Dark Matter of the Mind: The Culturally Articulated Unconscious ===
In this book, published by the University of Chicago Press, Everett reviews a great deal of philosophy, anthropology, linguistics, and cognitive science to argue that humans are molded by culture and that the idea of human nature is not a very good fit with the facts. He reiterates and supports Aristotle's claim that the mind is a blank slate and makes the case that the notion of the human self most compatible with the facts is the Buddhist concept of anātman.

=== How Language Began: The Story of Humanity's Greatest Invention ===
In this work, Everett makes the case that Homo erectus invented language nearly two million years ago and that the subsequent species Homo neanderthalensis and Homo sapiens were born into a linguistic world.

== Personal life ==
Influenced by the Pirahã's concept of truth, Everett's belief in Christianity slowly diminished and he became an atheist. He says that he was having serious doubts by 1982 and had abandoned all faith by 1985. He kept this atheism to himself until the late 1990s; when he finally opened up, his wife divorced him and two of his three children found it very hard to understand and accept; his wife also told their children to cut off all contacts with him. Later he married Linda Ann Everett and reconciled with his children.

He is the father of Caleb Everett.

== Selected publications ==
Everett is a prolific author and his CV lists nearly 130 published articles. He completed his masters thesis in 1979 and his doctoral thesis in 1983; both in Portuguese.

=== Books and monographs ===
- Everett, Daniel L. (1985). O desenvolvimento da teoria chomskyana: uma discussão epistemológica [The development of Chomskyan theory: an epistemological discussion] (in Portuguese). Lima: RLEE.
- Everett, Daniel L. (1986). Baako-Kasi (Translation of the Gospel of Mark into Pirahã) (in Pirahã). Brazil: Edições Vida Nova.
- Everett, Daniel L. (1992) [1983]. A língua Pirahã e a teoria da sintaxe: descrição, perspectivas e teoria (in Portuguese). Campinas: Editora da UNICAMP. ISBN 978-85-268-0082-3. OCLC 28431609.
- Everett, Daniel L. (1996). Why There Are No Clitics: An Alternative Perspective on Pronominal Allomorphy (PDF). Summer Institute of Linguistics and the University of Texas at Arlington Publications in Linguistics. Vol. 123. Dallas, Texas: Summer Institute of Linguistics and the University of Texas at Arlington. p. 188. ISBN 978-1-55671-004-9.
- Everett, Daniel L.; Kern, Barbara (1997). Wari': The Pacaas Novos Language of Western Brazil. Descriptive Grammars. London: Routledge. ISBN 978-0-415-00999-7.
- Everett, Daniel L. (2008). Don't Sleep, There Are Snakes: Life and Language in the Amazonian Jungle. New York: Pantheon Books. ISBN 978-0-375-42502-8.
- Everett, Daniel L. (2012). Language: The Cultural Tool. New York: Pantheon Books. ISBN 978-0-307-37853-8.
- Sakel, Jeanette; Everett, Daniel L. (2012). Linguistic Fieldwork: A Student Guide. Cambridge Textbooks in Linguistics. Cambridge: Cambridge University Press. p. 192. doi:10.1017/CBO9781139016254. ISBN 978-0-521-54598-3.
- Everett, Daniel L. (2016). Dark Matter of the Mind: The Culturally Articulated Unconscious. Chicago: University of Chicago Press. doi:10.7208/chicago/9780226401430.001.0001. ISBN 978-0-226-07076-6.
- Everett, Daniel L. (2017). How Language Began: The Story of Humanity's Greatest Invention. London: Profile Books. ISBN 978-1-78125-392-2.
- Everett, Daniel L. (2024). Charles Sanders Peirce: o Juggernaut americano (in Portuguese). Translated by Aleph Cedrim Barbalho, Carlos André Silva de Moura, and Danilo Vaz-Curado R. M. Costa. Recife: Editora da Universidade de Pernambuco (EDUPE). ISBN 978-65-85651-68-4.

=== Edited books, volumes, and journal issues ===
- Everett, Daniel L.; Kaufman, Terrence, eds. (1990). Pitt Working Papers in Linguistics (Edited volume). Pittsburgh: Department of Linguistics, University of Pittsburgh.
- Everett, Daniel L.; Coelho, Gail, eds. (1994). Pitt Working Papers in Linguistics (Edited volume). Vol. 2. Pittsburgh: Department of Linguistics, University of Pittsburgh.
- Everett, Daniel L., ed. (1997). "Volume 1, issue 1". Journal of Amazonian Languages (Edited journal issue). 1 (1). Department of Linguistics, University of Pittsburgh.
- Everett, Daniel L., ed. (1997). "Volume 1, issue 2". Journal of Amazonian Languages (Edited journal issue). 1 (2). Department of Linguistics, University of Pittsburgh.
- Hardy, Gordon M.; Everett, Daniel L., eds. (2013). Shaping the Future of Business Education: Relevance, Rigor, and Life Preparation. London: Palgrave Macmillan. pp. xxi, 270. doi:10.1057/9781137033383. ISBN 978-1-137-03337-6.

=== Theses and dissertations ===
- Everett, Daniel L. (1979). Aspectos da fonologia do Pirahã (Master's thesis) (in Portuguese). Campinas: Universidade Estadual de Campinas.
- Everett, Daniel L. (1983). A língua Pirahã e a teoria da sintaxe: descrição, perspectivas e teoria (D.Sc. thesis) (in Portuguese). Campinas: Universidade Estadual de Campinas.

=== Journal articles, scholarly responses, and working papers ===
- Everett, Daniel L. (1982). "Phonetic Rarities in Pirahã". Journal of the International Phonetic Association. 12 (2): 94–96. doi:10.1017/S0025100300002498.
- Everett, Daniel L. (1982). "Some Remarks on Minimal Pairs". Notes on Linguistics (22). Summer Institute of Linguistics: 24–30.
- Everett, Daniel L.; Pablo E., Abdias; Walker, James (1984). "An Initial Sketch of the Huastec Noun Phrase". Work Papers of the Summer Institute of Linguistics, University of North Dakota Session. 28: 91–130.
- Everett, Daniel L. (1984). "Clitic Doubling and Morphological Chains in Pirahã". Work Papers of the Summer Institute of Linguistics, University of North Dakota Session. 28: 51–90. doi:10.31356/silwp.vol28.02.
- Everett, Daniel L.; Everett, Keren (1984). "On the Relevance of Syllable Onsets to Stress Placement". Linguistic Inquiry. 15 (4): 705–711.
- Everett, Daniel L. (1985). "A Note on Ergativity, S′, and S″ in Karitiana". Work Papers of the Summer Institute of Linguistics, University of North Dakota Session. 29: 69–81. doi:10.31356/silwp.vol29.02.
- Everett, Daniel L.; Seki, Lucy (1985). "Reduplication and CV Skeleta in Kamaiura". Linguistic Inquiry. 16 (2): 326–330.
- Everett, Daniel L. (1985). "The Parametrization of Nominal Clitics in Universal Grammar". GLOW Newsletter: 36–38.
- Everett, Daniel L.; Seki, Lucy (1986). "Deletion, Reduplication, and CV Skeleta in Kamaiurá". Notes on Linguistics (Expanded version of CV item 19) (33): 48–52.
- Everett, Daniel L. (1986). "Pirahã Clitic Doubling and the Parametrization of Nominal Clitics". MIT Working Papers in Linguistics. 8. MIT Department of Linguistics and Philosophy: 85–127.
- Everett, Daniel L. (1986). "Ternary Constituents in Pirahã Phonology". Work Papers of the Summer Institute of Linguistics, University of North Dakota Session. 30: 13–41.
- Everett, Daniel L. (1987). "O diálogo e a seleção de dados para uma gramática". Cadernos de Estudos Linguísticos (in Portuguese). 11. UNICAMP: 21–38.
- Everett, Daniel L. (1987). "Pirahã Clitic Doubling". Natural Language & Linguistic Theory. 5 (2): 245–276. doi:10.1007/BF00166586.
- Everett, Daniel L. (1988). "A Note on Inalienable Possession and Anaphoric Indices in Brazilian Portuguese". Work Papers of the Summer Institute of Linguistics, University of North Dakota Session. 32: 87–91. doi:10.31356/silwp.vol32.04.
- Everett, Daniel L. (1988). "Clitics, Case, and Word Order in Yagua". Work Papers of the Summer Institute of Linguistics, University of North Dakota Session. 32: 93–142. doi:10.31356/silwp.vol32.05.
- Everett, Daniel L. (1988). "On Metrical Constituent Structure in Pirahã Phonology". Natural Language & Linguistic Theory. 6 (2): 207–246. doi:10.1007/BF00134230.
- Everett, Daniel L. (1989). "Anaphoric Indices and Inalienable Possession in Brazilian Portuguese". Linguistic Inquiry. 20 (3): 491–497.
- Everett, Daniel L. (1989). "Clitic Doubling, Reflexives, and Word Order Alternations in Yagua". Language. 65 (2): 339–372. doi:10.2307/415336. JSTOR 415336.
- Everett, Daniel L. (1990). "Extraprosodicity and Minimality in Kamã and Banawá". Pitt Working Papers in Linguistics. 1. Department of Linguistics, University of Pittsburgh.
- Everett, Daniel L. (1992). "Formal Linguistics and Field Work". Cadernos de Estudos Linguísticos (Also reprinted in Notes on Linguistics, May 1992). Campinas: UNICAMP.
- Everett, Daniel L. (1993). "Sapir, Reichenbach, and the Syntax of Tense in Pirahã". Pragmatics & Cognition. 1 (1): 89–124. doi:10.1075/pc.1.1.07eve.
- Everett, Daniel L.; Buller, Barbara; Buller, Ernest (1993). "Stress Placement, Syllable Structure, and Minimality in Banawá". International Journal of American Linguistics. 59 (3): 280–293. doi:10.1086/466199.
- Everett, Daniel L. (1994). "Restrições de Bloqueamento e a Teoria da Otimalidade". D.e.l.t.a. (in Portuguese). 10 (2).
- Everett, Daniel L. (1994). "The Sentential Divide in Language and Cognition: On Pragmatics of Word Order Flexibility and Related Issues". Pragmatics & Cognition. 2 (1): 131–166. doi:10.1075/pc.2.1.06eve.
- Ladefoged, Peter; Everett, Daniel L. (1996). "The Status of Phonetic Rarities". Language. 72 (4): 794–800. doi:10.2307/416103. JSTOR 416103.
- Ladefoged, Peter; Ladefoged, Jenny; Everett, Daniel L. (1997). "Phonetic Structures of Banawá, an Endangered Language". Phonetica. 54 (2): 94–111. doi:10.1159/000262213.
- Everett, Daniel L. (1999). "A Formação de Palavras na Sintaxe em Wari'". Palavra (Special issue: Limitação da Palavra) (in Portuguese).
- Berent, Iris; Everett, Daniel L.; Shimron, Joseph (2001). "Do Phonological Representations Specify Variables? Evidence from the Obligatory Contour Principle". Cognitive Psychology. 42 (1): 1–60. doi:10.1006/cogp.2000.0742. PMID 11161416.
- Everett, Daniel L. (2002). "Recollections of Kenneth L. Hale". Linguistic Typology (Memorial contribution). 6 (2).
- Everett, Daniel L. (2003). "Iambic Feet in Paumari and the Theory of Foot Structure". Linguistic Discovery. 2 (1): 22–44. doi:10.1349/PS1.1537-0852.A.263.
- Everett, Daniel L. (2005). "Biology and Language: A Consideration of Alternatives". Journal of Linguistics. 41 (1): 157–175. doi:10.1017/S0022226704003093.
- Everett, Daniel L. (2005). "Cultural Constraints on Grammar and Cognition in Pirahã: Another Look at the Design Features of Human Language". Current Anthropology. 46 (4): 621–646. doi:10.1086/431525. hdl:2066/41103.
- Everett, Daniel L. (2005). "Periphrastic Pronouns in Wari'". International Journal of American Linguistics. 71 (3): 303–326. doi:10.1086/497874.
- Everett, Daniel L. (2006). "Biology and Language: Response to Anderson & Lightfoot". Journal of Linguistics. 42 (2): 385–393. doi:10.1017/S0022226706003951.
- Everett, Daniel L. (2006). "Discussion on Cultural Constraints on Pirahã Grammar". Current Anthropology (Response to Valentina Bambini, Claudio Gentili, and Pietro Pietrini). 47 (1): 143–145. doi:10.1086/498952.
- Everett, Daniel L. (2007). "Challenging Chomskyan Linguistics: The Case of Pirahã". Human Development. 50 (6): 297–299. doi:10.1159/000109831.
- Frank, Michael C.; Everett, Daniel L.; Fedorenko, Evelina; Gibson, Edward (2008). "Number as a Cognitive Technology: Evidence from Pirahã Language and Cognition". Cognition. 108 (3): 819–824. doi:10.1016/j.cognition.2008.04.007. PMID 18547557.
- Everett, Daniel L. (2009). "Pirahã Culture and Grammar: A Response to Some Criticisms". Language. 85 (2): 405–442. doi:10.1353/lan.0.0104.
- Everett, Daniel L. (2012). "What Does Pirahã Grammar Have to Teach Us About Human Language and the Mind?". WIREs Cognitive Science. 3 (6): 555–563. doi:10.1002/wcs.1195. PMID 26305265.
- Everett, Daniel L. (2013). "The state of whose art? Reply to Nick Enfield's review of Language: the cultural tool". Journal of the Royal Anthropological Institute. 19 (3): 645–648. doi:10.1111/1467-9655.12055.
- Yoon, Jennifer M. D.; Witthoft, Nathan; Winawer, Jonathan; Frank, Michael C.; Everett, Daniel L.; Gibson, Edward (2014). "Cultural Differences in Perceptual Reorganization in US and Pirahã Adults". PLOS ONE. 9 (11) e110225. Bibcode:2014PLoSO...9k0225Y. doi:10.1371/journal.pone.0110225. PMC 4238998. PMID 25411970.
- Everett, Daniel L. (2015). "On Resilience, Homesigns and Nativism: A Response to Goldin-Meadow". Language, Cognition and Neuroscience. 30 (8): 919–921. doi:10.1080/23273798.2015.1053817.
- Futrell, Richard; Stearns, Laura; Everett, Daniel L.; Piantadosi, Steven T.; Gibson, Edward (2016). "A Corpus Investigation of Syntactic Embedding in Pirahã". PLOS ONE. 11 (3) e0145289. Bibcode:2016PLoSO..1145289F. doi:10.1371/journal.pone.0145289. PMC 4774923. PMID 26934636.
- Everett, Daniel L. (2016). "An Evaluation of Universal Grammar and the Phonological Mind". Frontiers in Psychology. 7: 15. doi:10.3389/fpsyg.2016.00015. PMC 4744836. PMID 26903889.
- Everett, Daniel L. (2017). "Grammar Came Later: Triality of Patterning and the Gradual Evolution of Language". Journal of Neurolinguistics. 43 (Part B): 133–165. doi:10.1016/j.jneuroling.2016.11.001.
- Everett, Daniel L. (2018). "The Role of Culture in Language and Cognition". Language and Linguistics Compass. 12 (11) e12304. doi:10.1111/lnc3.12304.
- Everett, Daniel L. (2020). "O papel da cultura na língua(gem) e na cognição". Cadernos de Linguística (in Portuguese). 1 (1): 1–37. doi:10.25189/2675-4916.2020.v1.n1.id281.
- Barham, Lawrence; Everett, Daniel L. (2021). "Semiotics and the Origin of Language in the Lower Palaeolithic". Journal of Archaeological Method and Theory. 28 (2): 535–579. doi:10.1007/s10816-020-09480-9.
- Caldwell-Harris, Catherine L.; Everett, Daniel L. (2025). "Religion Is of Reduced Importance When Not Needed to Solve the Problems of Social Living". Journal for the Cognitive Science of Religion (Peer commentary). 10 (1–2): 49–61. doi:10.1558/jcsr.23717.

== Discussed ==
In 2016 Tom Wolfe published a book, The Kingdom of Speech, in which he discusses work of four major figures in the history of the sciences of evolution and language, Charles Darwin, Noam Chomsky, Alfred Wallace, and Daniel Everett.

- Costa, Danilo Vaz-Curado R. M.; Arruda Júnior, Gerson Francisco de; Luna, José Marcos Gomes de; Silva, Eleonoura Enoque da, eds. (2023). Linguagem, sentido e ação na obra de Daniel Everett (in Portuguese). Recife: Editora da Universidade de Pernambuco (EDUPE).
- Gibson, Edward; Poliak, Moshe (2024). Gibson, Edward; Poliak, Moshe (eds.). From Fieldwork to Linguistic Theory: A Tribute to Dan Everett. Empirically Oriented Theoretical Morphology and Syntax. Vol. 15. Berlin: Language Science Press. doi:10.5281/zenodo.11351540. ISBN 978-3-96110-473-4.
