= Mura people =

Indigenous people of Brazil

Mura
Buxwaray
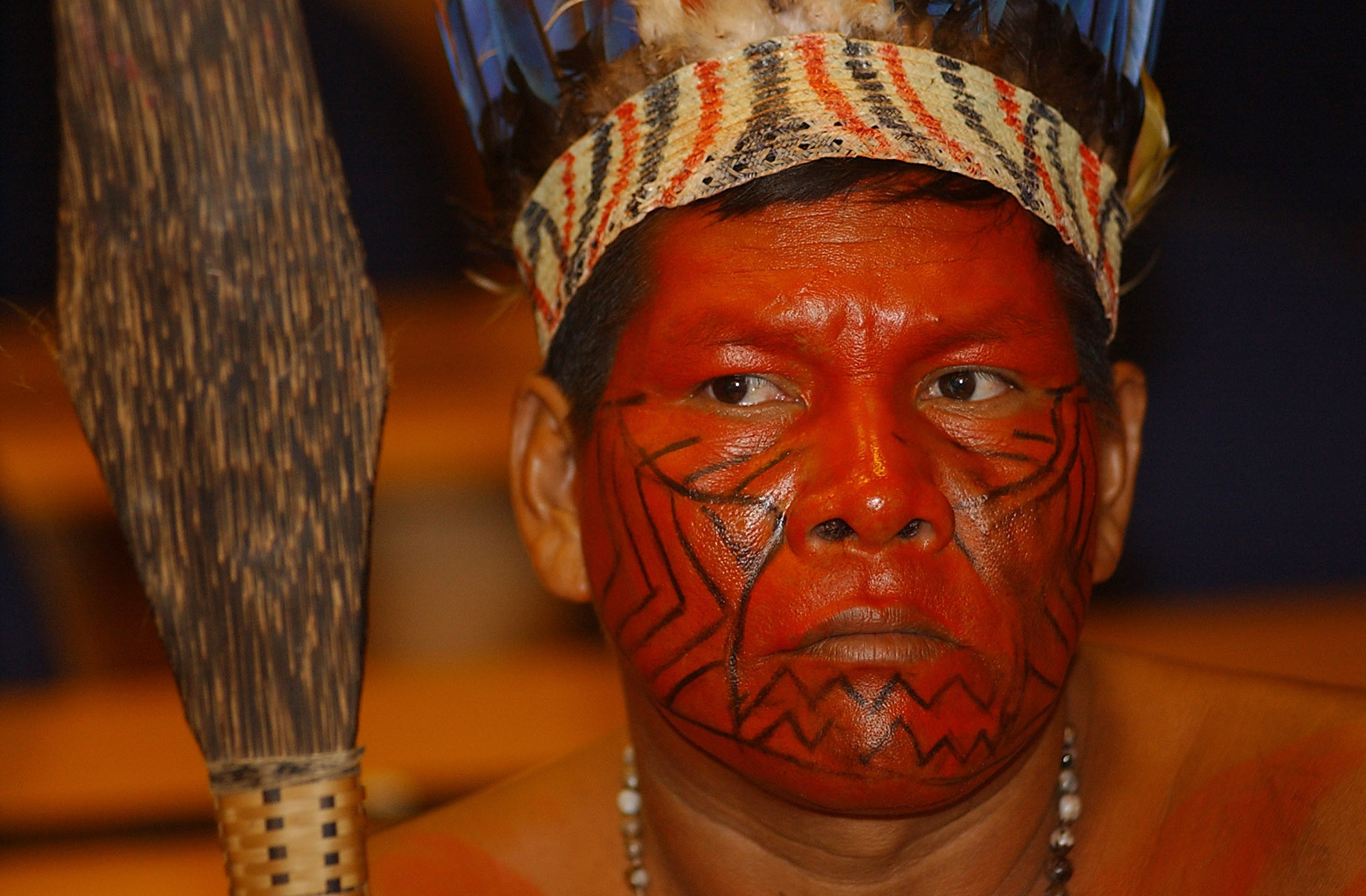

Total population
- 12,000

Regions with significant populations
- Brazil

Languages
- Portuguese, Mura, General Language

Religion
- Catholicism, Evangelicalism, Animism

Related ethnic groups
- Pirahã people

The Muras are an Indigenous people who live in the central and eastern parts of Amazonas, Brazil, along the Amazon river from the Madeira to the Purus. They played an important part in Brazilian history during colonial times and were known for their quiet determination and subsequent resistance to the encroaching Portuguese culture. Formerly a powerful people, they were defeated by their neighbors, the Munduruku, in 1788.

Of the original diversity of Muran languages, only Pirahã survives today.

== History ==
The Mura are first attested by the Portuguese in 1714 in a letter from a priest named Bartholomeu Rodrigues. They are identified as living on the right bank of the Madeira River. They were hostile to the encroaching Portuguese and the Jesuit Missionaries because a Portuguese trader had taken some Mura as slaves.

Starting in the early 18th century the Mura began a 100 year long era of conflict with the Portuguese. Early in the war the Mura engaged in open battle but after a defeat in the early 18th century they engaged in other forms of warfare as much as possible. The Mura during this war began to gradually expand as other tribes had been devastated by the Portuguese and had neither the will nor the power to stop the Mura, and the Portuguese military presence in the region was too limited to stop them. The Mura advance had reached a critical point by 1774 with the Mura threatening the entire state of Amazonas and sending the local Portuguese into a panic in 1784. This forced the Portuguese to establish a garrison and which quickly grew and to send an expedition to fight the Mura, though the expedition was ineffective. They had begun to negotiate and by 1786 peace had been made. The reasons for this peace are not entirely clear but disease and war with the Munduruku almost certainly being factors. After the Mura peace they continued to fight the Munduruku with the Munduruku gaining dominance over the Mura, it was said the Mura feared the Munduruku so much they let them take their women as wives.

After the peace was made the Mura and Portuguese and later Brazilians lived in peace for a time though eventually hostilities resumed. As the Portuguese began to convert and assimilate the Mura farming villages made up of pacified Mura began to be established starting in 1784. The Mura joined the Cabanagem Revolution with the Mura committing many massacres against the white population. The Brazilian army responded with a campaign of enslavement, repression, and massacres against the Mura which eventually ended the conflict. After the war roughly 1/3 of the Mura had died and they became heavily stigmatized by outsiders.

From roughly 1900-1920 the Mura were moved from many small villages to a smaller amount of larger villages and migrating into preexisting cities by the government The goal of this was the free up more land by taking it from the Mura for it to be settled by non-native Brazilians. Though in 1917 the Amazonas State Government allowed them to have small plots of land in the municipalities of Manicoré, Careiro, Itacoatiara and Borba. Much of this work was done by the Indian Protection Service which led to many disagreements between the two and the murder of IPS agent. The Mura like other indigenous groups were also exploited by the IPS and rubber barons during the Amazonian Rubber Boom. The Mura heavily intermarried with the Brazilian colonists, and today their physical appearance is very similar to that of non-indigenous Brazilians.

Starting in the 1970s the Mura began to push for more political rights. They were founding members of the Coordination of the Indigenous Organizations of the Brazilian Amazon (COIAB) and founded the Mura Indigenous Council to fight for their interests. In 1987 the Fundação Nacional dos Povos Indígenas (FNDPI) turned its attention towards the Mura and their conflict with the oil company Petrobras. The ensuing legal battle led to some minor concession to the Mura but more importantly gave them a sense of unity.

== Economy ==
The Mura unlike other indigenous tribes are not isolated from the outside world but rather have extensive relations with other tribes and the Brazilian government. Their economic activity is mostly made up of natural resource extraction through activities like fishing, farming, logging, Livestock farming, and straw farming; though ecotourism also plays a role with individual Mura villages usually focusing on a specific industry. The gender roles for each industry vary but usually the men take the more physical jobs with kids learning the job accompanying the men while women do less physical work.

== Religion ==
According to the Handbook of South American Indians, Mura animism has been heavily influenced by Catholicism containing characters such as the Holy Ghost, Saint Anthony, Saint Peter, and a Saint John though which one specifically is not stated. The Shamans of Mura paganism are both feared and respected with more wealth than the rest of society and are believed to have magical powers. Those Mura who are Christian only practice baptism, some feasts, and the veneration of some saints. They also incorporate several animist practices into their Christianity such as flagellation and narcotics usage.

== Territory ==
About 587 of them occupy the Cunhã-Sapucaia Indigenous Territory along the Igapó-Açu River which runs through the territory from west to east. The lower part of the Matupiri River enters the territory, where it flows into the Igapó-Açu River. The Matupi provides the main way to access the Matupiri State Park. In an unusual arrangement, the Mura people have an "indigenous special use zone" in the state park that allows them to continue to fish and extract forest products, as they have for many generations.

== Language ==
Originally the Mura spoke one of three dialects of the Mura language, but as they gained more contact with the outside world they gained some bilingualism in Nheengatú. Eventually, they switched fully to Brazilian Portuguese, with their knowledge of Nheengatú disappearing by the late 19th century and the Mura languages becoming extinct by the early 20th century. The only exception is the Pirahã people, a subgroup of the Mura who still use their indigenous language Pirahã.

== Sources ==
- Sakagawa, Sergio; Pereira dos Santos & Stancik, Henrique; Franzen, Juliane, Deposition: Indigenous special use zone in Matupiri State Park (AM), ISA
- Terra Indígena Cunhã-Sapucaia (in Portuguese), ISA: Instituto Socioambiental
- Mura @ Encyclopedia of Indigenous Peoples in Brazil - ISA, ISA: Instituto Socioambiental
