= Pirahã people =

Ethnic group in the Amazon Rainforest

Pirahã
Híaitíihi, Hiáitihí
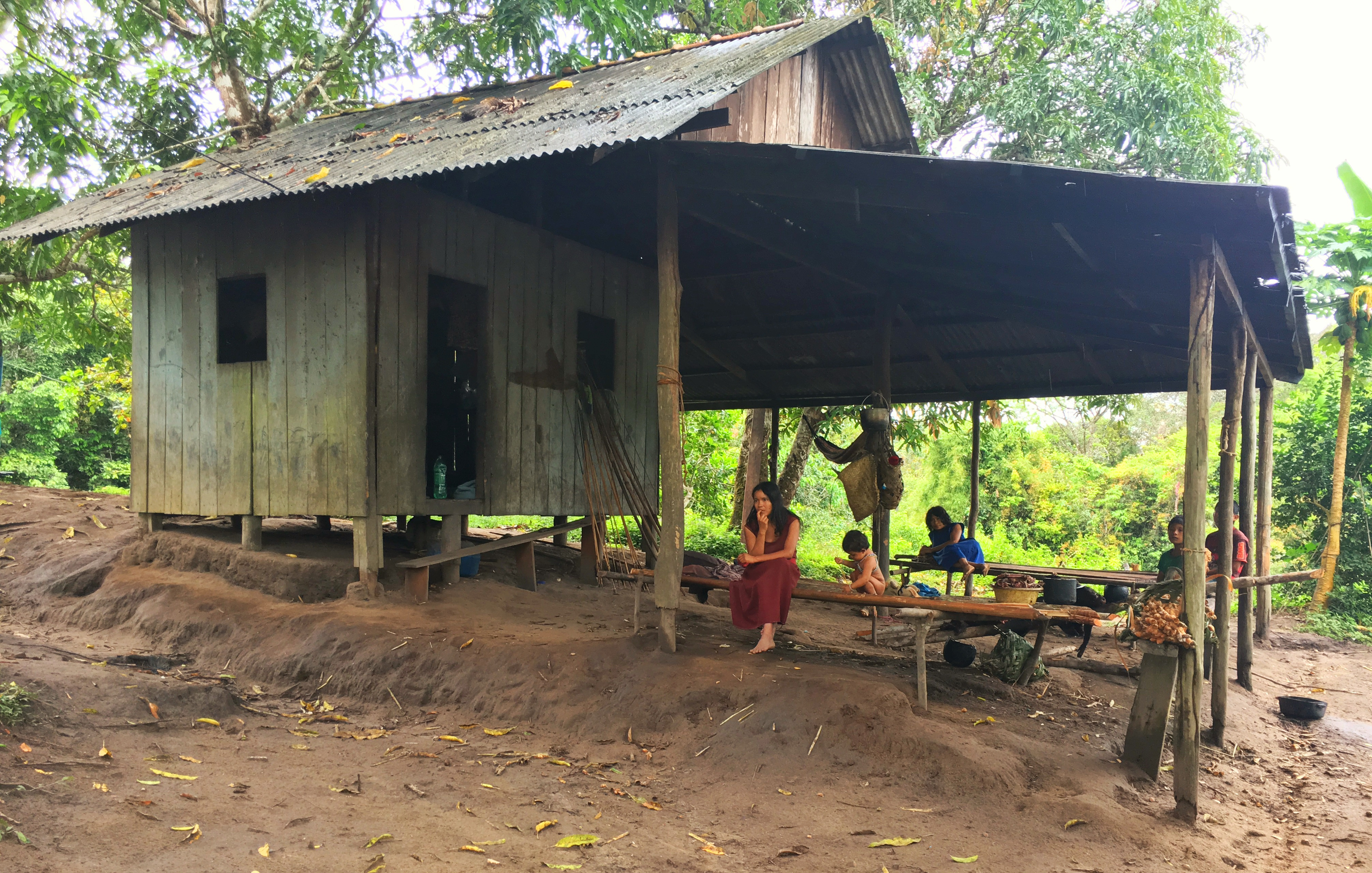
- A Pirahã family in 2018

Total population
- 900 (2024)

Regions with significant populations
- Brazil

Languages
- Portuguese, Pirahã

Religion
- Animism

Related ethnic groups
- other Mura people

The Pirahã (Portuguese pronunciation: [piɾaˈhɐ̃]) (Note: According to Daniel Everett, an approximate English pronunciation is pee-da-HAN.) are an Indigenous people of the Amazon rainforest in Brazil. They are the sole surviving subgroup of the Mura people and are hunter-gatherers. They live mainly on the banks of the Maici River in Humaitá and Manicoré in the state of Amazonas. As of 2024, they numbered 900 individuals. The name Pirahã is an exonym; the Pirahã call themselves the Híaitíihi or Hiáitihí, roughly translated as "the straight ones".

The Pirahã speak the Pirahã language. They call any other language "crooked head". Members of the Pirahã can whistle their language, which is how Pirahã men communicate when hunting in the jungle.

== Culture ==
According to the linguistic anthropologist and former Christian missionary Daniel Everett,

The Pirahã are supremely gifted in all the ways necessary to ensure their continued survival in the jungle: they know the usefulness and of their location and the all important plants in their area; they understand the behavior of local animals and how to catch and avoid them; and they can walk into the jungle naked, with no tools or weapons, and walk out three days later with baskets of fruit, nuts, and small game.

Pirahã have a simple kinship system that includes baíxi (parent, grandparent, or elder), xahaigí (sibling, male or female), hoagí or hoísai (son), kai (daughter), and piihí (stepchild, favorite child, child with at least one deceased parent, and more).

Daniel Everett states that one of the strongest Pirahã values is no coercion; one does not tell other people what to do. There appears to be no social hierarchy; the Pirahã have no formal leaders. Their social system is similar to that of many other hunter-gatherer bands in the world, although rare in the Amazon because of a history of horticulture before Western contact (see history of the Amazon).

Although the Pirahã use canoes every day for fishing and for crossing the river beside which they live, when their canoes wear out, they use pieces of bark as temporary canoes. Everett brought in a master builder who taught and supervised the Pirahã in making a canoe so that they could make their own. However, when they needed another canoe, they said that "Pirahã do not make canoes" and told Everett he should buy them a canoe. The Pirahã rely on neighboring communities' canoe work and use those canoes for themselves.

Pirahã build simple huts where they keep a few pots, pans, knives, and machetes. They make only scraping implements (for making arrowheads), loosely woven palm-leaf bags, bows, and arrows. They take naps of 15 minutes to, at the most, two hours throughout the day and night, and rarely sleep through the night.

They do not store food in any quantity, but generally eat it when they get it. Pirahã have ignored lessons in preserving meats by salting or smoking. They cultivate manioc plants that grow from spit-out seeds and make only a few days' worth of manioc flour at a time. They trade Brazil nuts and sex for consumables or tools, e.g. machetes, gunpowder, powdered milk, sugar, whiskey. Chastity is not a cultural value. They trade Brazil nuts, wood, and sorva (rubbery sap used in chewing gum) for soda-can pull-tabs, which are used for necklaces. Men wear T-shirts and shorts that they get from traders; women sew their own plain cotton dresses.

Their decoration is mostly necklaces, used primarily to ward off spirits. The concept of drawing is alien to them and when asked to draw a person, animal, tree, or river, the result is simple lines. However, on seeing a novelty such as an airplane, a child may make a model of it, which may be soon discarded.

Their romantic relationships include that “[they] do not allow marriage outside their tribe, they long have kept their gene pool refreshed by permitting their women to sleep with outsiders” according to John Colapinto.

== Religion ==
According to Everett, the Pirahã have no concept of a supreme spirit or god; however, they do believe in spirits that can sometimes take on the shape of things in the environment. These spirits can be jaguars, trees, or other visible, tangible things including people. Everett reported one incident where the Pirahã said that "Xigagaí, one of the beings that lives above the clouds, was standing on a beach yelling at us, telling us that he would kill us if we go into the jungle." Everett and his daughter could see nothing and yet the Pirahã insisted that Xigagaí was still on the beach.

Pirahã cosmology involves "layers" of land, parallel planes which do not communicate, stacked upon one another in a stratigraphic fashion, they do not know the exact number of layers, but can reduce it down to roughly five, the middle level is inhabited exclusively by human beings, there are also abaisi, spirits, who have the same general form as humans, but are considered "deformed" beings. The kaoaiboge and toipe are posthumous transformations of humans, inhabiting the level immediately beneath the middle. One "spirit" believed in by the Piraha is Kaoaiboge, which is fed upon by the cannibalistic toipe. The Piraha also say that at one point their society had an equivalent to warriors: euebihiai, who also filled the role of hunters. Before killing someone, the eubihai would carefully record them, making sure to give them a name, the killer then gave the enemy the abaisi name possessed by a deceased person.

== History ==
The Pirahã, a subgroup of the Mura people, encountered traders, missionaries, and government officials over centuries. Despite this, they resisted fully adopting outsiders' culture. They have historically been highly resistant to outside cultural influence and language, including Portuguese, though they interact with Portuguese speakers for trade. The first European contact with the Pirahã was led by Pedro Teixeira along with 70 soldiers and roughly 1,200 Indigenous people in 47 large canoes. He was the first European to travel up the entire length of the Amazon River, known as "O Conquistador da Amazônia" (Portuguese for The Conqueror of the Amazon).

A 2012 documentary called The Grammar of Happiness, which aired on the Smithsonian Channel, reported that a school had been opened for the Pirahã community where they learn Portuguese and mathematics. According to FUNAI the school is the responsibility of the Ministry of Education of Brazil. In addition to a formal school being introduced to the culture, the documentary also reported that the Brazilian government installed a modern medical clinic, electricity, and television in the remote area.

== Language ==
Anthropological linguist Daniel Everett, who wrote the first Pirahã grammar, claims that there are related pairs of curiosities in their language and culture.

After working with the language for 30 years, Everett states that it has no relative clauses or grammatical recursion. Everett points out that there is recursion of ideas: that in a story, there may be subordinate ideas inside other ideas. He also pointed out that different experts have different definitions of recursion. If the language lacks grammatical recursion, then it is proposed as a counterexample to the theory proposed by Chomsky, Hauser and Fitch (2002) that recursion is a feature which all human languages must have.

Pirahã is perhaps second only to Rotokas in New Guinea for the distinction of having the fewest phonemes of any of the world's languages. Women sometimes pronounce s as h, reducing the inventory further still. Everett states that Pirahã, Rotokas, and Hawaiian each have 11 phonemes.

Their language is a unique living language (it is related to Mura, which is no longer spoken). John Colapinto explains, "Unrelated to any other extant tongue, and based on just eight consonants and three vowels, Pirahã has one of the simplest sound systems known. Yet it possesses such a complex array of tones, stresses, and syllable lengths that its speakers can dispense with their vowels and consonants altogether and sing, hum, or whistle conversations." Peter Gordon writes that the language has a very complex verb structure: "To the verb stem are appended up to 15 potential slots for morphological markers that encode aspectual notions such as whether events were witnessed, whether the speaker is certain of its occurrence, whether it is desired, whether it was proximal or distal, and so on. None of the markers encode features such as person, number, tense or gender."

Curiously, although not unprecedentedly, the language has no cardinal or ordinal numbers. Some researchers, such as Peter Gordon of Columbia University, claim that the Pirahã are incapable of learning numeracy. His colleague, Daniel L. Everett, on the other hand, argues that the Pirahã are cognitively capable of counting; they simply choose not to do so. They believe that their culture is complete and does not need anything from outside cultures. Everett says, "The crucial thing is that the Pirahã have not borrowed any numbers—and they want to learn to count. They asked me to give them classes in Brazilian numbers, so for eight months I spent an hour every night trying to teach them how to count. And it never got anywhere, except for a few of the children. Some of the children learned to do reasonably well, but as soon as anybody started to perform well, they were sent away from the classes. It was just a fun time to eat popcorn and watch me write things on the board."

The language does not have words for precise numbers, but rather concepts for a small amount and a larger amount.

The language may have no unique words for colors, contradicting Berlin and Kay's hypothesis on the universality of color-naming. There are no unanalyzable root words for color; the recorded color words are all compounds like mii sai or bii sai, "blood-like", indicating that colors in the language are adjectival comparisons that are not consistently applied.

It is suspected that the language's entire pronoun set was recently borrowed from one of the Tupí–Guaraní languages, and that before that the language may have had no pronouns whatsoever. Many linguists, however, find this claim questionable due to lack of evidence. However, if there had been pronouns at an earlier stage of Pirahã, this would not affect Everett's claim of the significance of the system's simplicity today. There are few Tupi–Guaraní loanwords in areas of the lexicon more susceptible to borrowing (such as nouns referring to cultural items, for instance).

== See also ==
- Keren Everett, Everett's ex-wife and the most fluent non-Pirahã in their language
- Linguistic relativity
