= Pirahã language =

Muran language

Pirahã
- Múra-Pirahã
- xapaitíiso
- Pronunciation: /ʔàpài̯ˈtʃîːsò/
- Native to: Brazil
- Region: Maici River
- Ethnicity: Pirahã
- Native speakers: 250–380 (2009)
- Language family: Mura: Pirahã
- Writing system: Latin

Language codes
- ISO 639-3: myp
- Glottolog: pira1253
- ELP: Pirahã
- Pirahã is classified as Vulnerable by the UNESCO Atlas of the World's Languages in Danger.

Pirahã (also spelled Pirahá, Pirahán), or Múra-Pirahã, is the indigenous language of the Pirahã people of Amazonas, Brazil. The Pirahã live along the Maici River, a tributary of the Amazon River. Pirahã is estimated to have between 250 and 380 speakers. It is not in immediate danger of extinction, as its use is vigorous and the Pirahã community is mostly monolingual.

The Pirahã language is the subject of various controversial claims: for example, that it provides evidence against linguistic relativity. The controversy is compounded by the difficulty of learning the language; the number of linguists with field experience in Pirahã is very small. Consequently, many claims which identify Pirahã as exhibiting features contradictory to the most normative understanding of human language cognition have not as of yet engendered considerable confidence.

== Classification ==
Pirahã is the only surviving dialect of the Mura language, all others having died out in the last few centuries as most groups of the Mura people have shifted to Portuguese. Pirahã can therefore be considered its own language now. Suspected relatives, such as Matanawi, are also extinct.

Mura and Pirahã vocabulary
| gloss | Mura | Pirahã |
|---|---|---|
| long | peissí | piiʔi |
| short | kutjúhi | koihí |
| big | itokúi | itohí |

== Name ==
Speakers refer to their language as Apáitisí, and to their own ethnic group as Hiáitihí.

== Knowledge of other languages ==
Daniel Everett states that most of the remaining Pirahã speakers are monolingual, knowing only a few words of Portuguese. The anthropologist Marco Antônio Gonçalves, who lived with the Pirahã for 18 months over several years, writes that most of the men understand Portuguese, though not all of them are able to express themselves in the language. Women have little understanding of Portuguese and never use it as a form of expression. The men developed a contact 'language' or pidgin that allowed them to communicate with regional populations, mixing words from Pirahã, Portuguese and Nheengatu, the Amazonian General Language.

Everett states that the Pirahã use a very rudimentary Portuguese lexicon with Pirahã grammar when speaking Portuguese and that their Portuguese is so limited to very specific topics that they are rightly called monolingual, without contradicting Gonçalves (since they can communicate on a very narrow range of topics using a very restricted lexicon). Future research on developing bilingualism (Pirahã-Portuguese) in the community, along the lines of Sakel and Gonçalves, will provide valuable data for the discussion on speakers' grammatical competence (e.g. regarding the effect of culture). Although Gonçalves quotes whole stories told by the Pirahã, Everett has claimed that the Portuguese in these stories is not a literal transcription of what was said, but a free translation from the pidgin Portuguese of the Pirahã.

In a 2012 study, Jeanette Sakel studied the use of Portuguese by a group of Pirahã speakers and reported that, when speaking Portuguese, most Pirahã speakers employ simple syntactic constructions, but some more proficient speakers utilize constructions that could be analysed as complex constructions, such as subordinating conjunctions and complement clauses.

== Phonology ==
The Pirahã language is one of the phonologically simplest languages known, comparable to Rotokas (New Guinea) and the Lakes Plain languages such as Obokuitai. There is a claim that Pirahã has as few as ten phonemes, one fewer than Rotokas, or even as few as nine for women, but this requires analyzing [k] as an underlying /hi/ and having /h/ invariably substituted for /s/ in female speech. Although such a phenomenon is odd cross-linguistically, Ian Maddieson has found in studying Pirahã data that /k/ does indeed exhibit an unusual distribution in the language.

When languages have inventories as small and allophonic variation as great as in Pirahã and Rotokas, different linguists may have very different ideas as to the nature of their phonological systems.

=== Tone ===
The tone-bearing unit in Pirahã is the mora. The "ten-phoneme" claim also does not consider the tones of Pirahã, at least two of which are phonemic (marked by an acute accent and either unmarked or marked by a grave accent in Daniel Everett's works), bringing the number of phonemes to at least twelve. According to Steven N. Sheldon there are three tones, high (¹), mid (²) and low (³). Silva (2014) posits four phonemic tones in Pirahã, two level tones, high and low, and two contour tones, rising and falling, the latter of which are produced when morae of differing tones follow the other.

Pirahã can be whistled, hummed, or encoded in music. In fact, Keren Everett believes that current research on the language misses much of its meaning by paying little attention to the language's prosody. Consonants and vowels may be omitted altogether and the meaning conveyed solely through variations in pitch, stress, and rhythm. She says that mothers teach their children the language through constantly singing the same musical patterns.

=== Vowels ===
| | Front | Back |
|---|---|---|
| Close | i | o |
| Open | a | o |

Sequences of two vowels are bimoraic and therefore have two tone-bearing units; thus, each unit has its own level tone.

=== Consonants ===
The segmental phonemes are presented in the following table. Phonemes not universally recognized as such are in (parentheses).

| | | Labial | Coronal | Dorsal | Glottal |
|---|---|---|---|---|---|
| Occlusive | voiceless | p | t | (k) | ʔ ⟨x⟩ |
| Occlusive | voiced | b | | ɡ | |
| Continuant | | (w) | s | (j) | h |

The glottal stop [ʔ] is inserted predictably at the start of a word. Salles (2023) also treats the two glides /j, w/ as phonemic.

- Everett posits that [k] is an allophone of the sequence /hi/.
- Women sometimes use /h/ instead of /s/.

The number of phonemes is at most thirteen, matching Hawaiian, if [k] is counted as a phoneme and there are just two tones; if [k] is not phonemic, there are twelve phonemes, one more than the number found in Rotokas, or eleven among women who uniformly replace /s/ with /h/. (English, by comparison, has thirty to forty-five, depending on dialect.) However, many of the phonemes show a great deal of allophonic variation. Free variation is very common in Pirahã; [b]~[m], [ɡ]~[n], [k]~[ʔ] are the most common and are found only word-internally.

Pirahã consonants with example words
| Phoneme | Phone | Word |
|---|---|---|
| /p/ | [p] | pibaóí "otter" |
| /t/ | [t] | taahoasi "sand" |
| /t/ | [tʃ] before /i/ | tii "residue" |
| /k/ | [k] | kaaxai "macaw" |
| /ʔ/ | [ʔ] | kaaxai "macaw" |
| /b/ | [b] | xísoobái "down (noun)" |
| /b/ | [m] initially | boopai "throat, neck" |
| /b/ | [ʙ] before /o/ | kaoáíbogi "evil spirit" |
| /ɡ/ | [ɡ] | xopóogií "inga (fruit)" |
| /ɡ/ | [n] initially | gáatahaí "can (noun)" |
| /ɡ/ | [ɺɺ̼] (see below) | toogixi "hoe" |
| /s/ | [s] | sahaxai "should not" |
| /s/ | [ʃ] before /i/ | xísiisí "fat (noun)" |
| /h/ | [h] | xáapahai "bird arrow" |

For instance, vowels are nasalized after the glottal consonants /h/ and /ʔ/ (written h and x). Also,

- /b/ [b, ʙ, m]: the nasal [m] after a pause, the trill [ʙ] before /o/. It is argued by Everett that the latter is only produced "around people whom the speaker is familiar".
- /ɡ/ [ɡ, n, ɺɺ̼]: the nasal [n] (an apical alveolar nasal) after a pause; [ɺɺ̼] is an alveolar–labiolingual lateral 'double flap' that has only been reported for this language, where the tongue strikes the alveolar ridge and then strikes the lower lip; it is a phonetic cluster that has "two, non-contiguous, non-simultaneous points of articulation." However, it is only used in certain special types of speech performances and so might not be considered a normal speech sound. Everett also claims that the latter is only produced "around people whom the speaker is familiar".
- /s/ [s, h]: /s/ occurs as [h] before [i] and other vowels more frequently in women's speech than men's.
- /k/ [k, p, h, ʔ]: in men's speech, word-initial [k] and [ʔ] are interchangeable. For many people, [k] and [p] may be exchanged in some words. The sequences [hoa] and [hia] are said to be in free variation with [kwa] and [ka], at least in some words.

Because of its variation, Everett states that /k/ is not a stable phoneme. By analyzing it as /hi/, he is able to theoretically reduce the number of consonants to seven (or six for women with constant /h/-substitution).

=== Phonotactics ===
Syllables in Pirahã are, according to Salles (2023), in the shape of (C)V(V)(G), where C is a wildcard symbol for any consonant, V for any vowel, and G for any glide (i.e. /j, w/). The only consonants other than glides which may be found in the coda position is /s/ in the animal classifier ʔís, which becomes [ʔí] preceding another word beginning in a consonant. Complex onsets do not occur. The sequence *[ki] is not documented in Pirahã.

== Typology ==
Everett, over the course of more than two dozen papers and one book about the language, has ascribed various surprising features to it, including:

- One of the smallest phoneme inventories of any known language and a correspondingly high degree of allophonic variation, including one very rare sound, [ɺ͡ɺ̼], an alveolar–labiolingual lateral 'double flap'. It is reported to be used as a phone in only this language.
- An extremely limited clause structure, not allowing for nested recursive sentences like "Mary said that John thought that Henry was fired".
- No abstract color words other than terms for light and dark (though this is disputed).
- The entire set of personal pronouns appears to have been borrowed from Nheengatu, a Tupi-based lingua franca. Although there is no documentation of a prior stage of Pirahã, the close resemblance of the Pirahã pronouns to those of Nheengatu makes this hypothesis plausible.

Daniel Everett claims that the absence of recursion in the language, if real, falsifies the basic assumption of modern Chomskyan linguistics. This claim is contested by many linguists, who claim that recursion has been observed in Pirahã by Daniel Everett himself, while Everett argues that those utterances that superficially seemed recursive to him at first were misinterpretations caused by his earlier lack of familiarity with the language. Furthermore, some linguists, including Chomsky himself, argue that even if Pirahã lacked recursion, that would have no implications for Chomskyan linguistics.

== Syntax ==
=== Pronouns ===
The basic Pirahã personal pronouns are:

- ti "I, we"
- gi or gíxai [níʔàì] "you"
- hi "they (sg. or pl), this"

These can be serially combined: ti gíxai or ti hi to mean "we" (inclusive and exclusive), and gíxai hi to mean "you (plural)", or combined with xogiáagaó 'all', as in "we (all) go".

There are several other pronouns reported, such as 'she', 'it' (animal), 'it' (aquatic animal), and 'it' (inanimate), but these may actually be nouns, and they cannot be used independently the way the three basic pronouns can. The fact that different linguists come up with different lists of such pronouns suggests that they are not basic to the grammar. In two recent papers, Everett cites Sheldon as agreeing with his (Everett's) analysis of the pronouns.

According to Sheldon, this is the list of pronouns:

| Pirahã | English |
|---|---|
| ti^{3} | "I" |
| gi^{1}xai^{3} | "you" (sing.) |
| hi^{3} | "he" (human) |
| i^{3} | "she" (human) |
| i^{1}k | "it", "they" (land animals) |
| si^{3} | "it", "they" (water animals) |
| a^{3} | "it", "they" (inanimate objects) |
| ti^{3}a^{1}ti^{3}so^{3} | "we" |
| gi^{1}xa^{3}i^{1}ti^{3}so^{3} | "you" (pl.) |
| hi^{3}ai^{1}ti^{3}so^{3} | "they" (human?) |

Pronouns are prefixed to the verb, in the order SUBJECT-INDOBJECT-OBJECT where INDOBJECT includes a preposition "to", "for", etc. They may all be omitted, e.g., hi^{3}-ti^{3}-gi^{1}xai^{3}-bi^{2}i^{3}b-i^{3}ha^{3}i^{1} "he will send you to me".

For possession, a pronoun is used in apposition (zero-marking):

paitá hi xitóhoi
Paita he testicles
"Paita's testicles"

ti kaiíi
I house
"my house"

Thomason & Everett note the pronouns are formally close to those of the Tupian languages Nheengatu and Tenharim, which the Mura had once used as contact languages:

| Pronoun | Nheengatu | Tenharim | Pirahã |
|---|---|---|---|
| 1sg | /xe/ [ʃɪ] | [dʒi] | /ti/ [tʃi] |
| 2sg | /ne/ | [ne, nde] | /ɡi, ɡixa/ [nɪ, nɪʔa] |
| 3 | /ahe/; clitic /i-/ [ɪ, e] | [hea] (3fs), [ahe] (3.human) | /hi/ [hɪ] |

Both the Tupian and Pirahã third-person pronouns can be used as demonstratives, as in Pirahã hi xobaaxai ti "I am really smart" (lit. "This one sees well: me"). Given the restricted set of Pirahã phonemes, the Pirahã pronouns ti and gi are what one would expect if the Tupian pronouns were borrowed, and hi differs only in dropping the a.

=== Verbs ===
Pirahã is agglutinative, using a large number of affixes to communicate grammatical meaning. Even the 'to be' verbs of existence or equivalence are suffixes in Pirahã. For instance, the Pirahã sentence "there is a paca there" uses just two words; the copula is a suffix on "paca":

káixihíxao-xaagá gáihí
paca-exists there
"There's a paca there"

Pirahã also uses suffixes that communicate evidentiality, a category lacking in English grammar, but present in languages such as Turkish, Georgian, and Japanese. One such suffix, -xáagahá, means that the speaker actually observed the event in question:

hoagaxóai hi páxai kaopápi-sai-xáagahá
Hoaga'oai they {a species of fish} catch-ing-(I_saw_it)
"Hoaga'oai caught a pa'ai fish (I know because I saw it)"

(The suffix -sai turns a verb into a noun, like English '-ing'.)

Other verbal suffixes indicate that an action is deduced from circumstantial evidence, or based on hearsay. Unlike in English, in Pirahã speakers must state their source of information: they cannot be ambiguous. There are also verbal suffixes that indicate desire to perform an action, frustration in completing an action, or frustration in even starting an action.

There are also a large number of verbal aspects: perfective (completed) vs. imperfective (uncompleted), telic (reaching a goal) vs. atelic, continuing, repeated, and commencing. However, despite this complexity, there appears to be little distinction of transitivity. For example, the same verb, xobai, can mean either 'look' or 'see', and xoab can mean either 'die' or 'kill'.

The verbs are, however, zero-marked, with no grammatical agreement with the arguments of the verb.

ti xíbogi ti-baí
I milk drink-INTENSIFIER
"I really drink milk."

ti gí kapiigaxiítoii hoa-í
I you pencil give-PROX
"I give the pencil to you."

According to Sheldon, the Pirahã verb has eight main suffix-slots, and a few sub-slots:

- Slot A
  - intensive ba^{3}i^{1}
  - Ø
- Slot B
  - causative/incompletive bo^{3}i^{1}
  - causative/completive bo^{3}ga^{1}
  - inchoative/incompletive ho^{3}i^{1}
  - inchoative/completive hoa^{3}ga^{1}
  - future/somewhere a^{2}i^{3}p
  - future/elsewhere a^{2}o^{3}p
  - past a^{2}o^{3}b
  - Ø
- Slot C
  - negative/optative sa^{3}i^{1} + C1
    - Slot C1
      - preventive ha^{3}xa^{3}
      - opinionated ha^{3}
      - possible Ø
  - positive/optative a^{3}a^{1}ti^{3}
  - negative/indicative hia^{3}b + C2
  - positive/indicative Ø + C2
    - Slot C2
      - declarative a^{1}
      - probabilistic/certain i^{3}ha^{3}i^{1}
      - probabilistic/uncertain/beginning a^{3}ba^{3}ga^{3}i^{1}
      - probabilistic/uncertain/execution a^{3}ba^{3}i^{1}
      - probabilistic/uncertain/completion a^{3}a^{1}
      - stative i^{2}xi^{3}
      - interrogative1/progressive i^{1}hi^{1}ai^{1}
      - interrogative2/progressive o^{1}xoi^{1}hi^{1}ai^{1}
      - interrogative1 i^{1}hi^{1}
      - interrogative2 o^{1}xoi^{1}hi^{1}
      - Ø
- Slot D
  - continuative xii^{3}g
  - repetitive ta^{3}
  - Ø
- Slot E
  - immediate a^{1}ha^{1}
  - intentive i^{3}i^{1}
  - Ø
- Slot F
  - durative a^{3}b
  - Ø
- Slot G
  - desiderative so^{3}g
  - Ø
- Slot H
  - causal ta^{3}i^{1}o^{3}
  - conclusive si^{3}bi^{3}ga^{3}
  - emphatic/reiterative koi + H1
  - emphatic ko^{3}i^{1} + H1
  - reiterative i^{3}sa^{3} + H1
  - Ø + H1
    - Slot H1
      - present i^{3}hi^{1}ai^{3}
      - past i^{3}xa^{1}a^{3}ga^{3}
      - pastImmediate a^{3}ga^{3}ha^{1}

These suffixes undergo some phonetic changes depending on context. For instance, the continuative -xii³g reduces to -ii³g after a consonant:

ai3t-a1b-xii3g-a1
ai3ta1bii3ga1
"he is still sleeping"

Also an epenthetic vowel gets inserted between two suffixes if necessary to avoid a consonant-cluster; the vowel is either i³ (before or after ⟨s⟩, ⟨p⟩, or ⟨t⟩) or a³ (other cases):

o3ga3i1 so3g-sa3i1
o3ga3i1 so3gi3sa3i1
"he possibly may not want a field"

Conversely, when the junction of two morphemes creates a double vowel (ignoring tones), the vowel with the lower tone is suppressed:

si3-ba1-bo3-ga3-a1
si3ba1bo3ga1
"he caused the arrow to wound it"

=== Embedding ===
Everett originally claimed that in order to embed one clause within another, the embedded clause is turned into a noun with the -sai suffix seen above:

hi ob-áaxái kahaí kai-sai
(s)he knows-really arrow make-ing
"(S)he really knows how to make arrows" (lit. '(S)he really knows arrow-making')

ti xog-i-baí gíxai kahaí kai-sai
I want-this-very.much you arrow make-ing

The examples of embedding were limited to one level of depth, so that to say "He really knows how to talk about making arrows", more than one sentence would be needed.

Everett has also concluded that because Pirahã does not have number-words for counting, does not allow recursive adjective-lists like "the green wealthy hunchbacked able golfer", and does not allow recursive possessives like "The child's friend's mother's house", a Pirahã sentence must have a length limit. This leads to the additional conclusion that the number of different possible sentences in Pirahã with any given vocabulary is finite.

Everett has also recently reinterpreted even the limited form of embedding in the example above as parataxis. He now states that Pirahã does not admit any embedding at all, not even one level deep. He says that words that appear to form a clause in the example are actually a separate unembedded sentence, which, in context, expresses the same thought that would be expressed by a clause in English. He gives evidence for this based on the lack of specialized words for clause-formation, the pattern of coreferring tokens in the purported clause-constructions, and examples where the purported clause is separated from the rest of the sentence by other complete sentences.

Everett stated that Pirahã cannot say "John's brother's house" but must say, "John has a brother. This brother has a house." in two separate sentences.

According to Everett, the statement that Pirahã is a finite language without embedding and without recursion presents a challenge for proposals by Noam Chomsky and others concerning universal grammar—on the grounds that if these proposals are correct, all languages should show evidence of recursive (and similar) grammatical structures.

Chomsky has replied that he considers recursion to be an innate cognitive capacity that is available for use in language but that the capacity may or may not manifest itself in any one particular language.

However, as Everett points out, the language can have recursion in ideas, with some ideas in a story being less important than others. He also described recursive behaviors in deer as they forage for food. So to him, recursion can be a brain property that humans have developed more than other animals. He points out that the criticism of his conclusions uses his own doctoral thesis to refute his knowledge and conclusions drawn after a subsequent twenty-nine years of research.

Everett's observation that the language does not allow recursion has also been vigorously disputed by other linguists, who call attention to data and arguments from Everett's own previous publications, which interpreted the "-sai" construction as embedding. Everett has responded that his earlier understanding of the language was incomplete and slanted by theoretical bias. He now says that the morpheme -sai attached to the main verb of a clause merely marks the clause as 'old information', and is not a nominalizer at all (or a marker of embedding). In 2010 a research points to a tonal distinction in the use of "-sai" when the sentence might include embedding, but a later research by a different group also found instances of the same tonally distinct "-sai" used in simple sentences.

== Vocabulary ==
Pirahã has a few loan words, mainly from Portuguese. Pirahã kóópo ("cup") is from the Portuguese word copo, and bikagogia ("business") comes from Portuguese mercadoria ("merchandise").

=== Kinship terms ===
Everett says that the Pirahã culture has the simplest known kinship system of any human culture. A single word, baíxi (pronounced [màíʔì]), is used for both 'mother' and 'father' (like English "parent", although Pirahã has no gendered alternative), and they appear not to keep track of relationships any more distant than biological siblings.

=== Numerals and grammatical number ===
According to Everett, Pirahã has words for 'one' (hói) and 'two' (hoí), distinguished only by tone. In his 2005 analysis, however, Everett said that Pirahã has no words for numerals at all, and that hói and hoí actually mean "small quantity" and "larger quantity" (or like English "fewer/less" and "more"). Michael Frank, Everett, and several others have described two experiments on four Pirahã speakers that were designed to test these two hypotheses.

In one, ten spools of thread were placed on a table one at a time and the Pirahã were asked how many were there. All four speakers answered in accordance with the hypothesis that the language has words for 'one' and 'two' in this experiment, uniformly using hói for one spool, hoí for two spools, and a mixture of the second word and 'many' for more than two spools.

The second experiment, however, started with ten spools of thread on the table, and spools were subtracted one at a time. In this experiment, one speaker used hói (the word previously supposed to mean 'one') when there were six spools left, and all four speakers used that word consistently when there were as many as three spools left. Though Frank and his colleagues do not attempt to explain their subjects' difference in behavior in these two experiments, they conclude that the two words under investigation "are much more likely to be relative or comparative terms like 'few' or 'fewer' than absolute terms like 'one'".

There is no grammatical distinction between singular and plural, even in pronouns.

A 2012 documentary aired on the Smithsonian Channel reported that a school had been opened for the Pirahã community where they learn Portuguese and mathematics. As a consequence, observations involving concepts like the notion of quantity (which has a singular treatment in Pirahã language) became impossible, because of the influence of the new knowledge on the results.

=== Color ===
There is also a claim that Pirahã lacks any unique color terminology, being one of the few cultures (mostly in the Amazon basin and New Guinea) that only have specific words for 'light' and 'dark' if that claim is true. (Note: Could also be analysed as 'white' and 'black'.) Although the Pirahã glossary that Daniel Everett initially published includes a list of color words, as of 2006, Everett was saying that the items listed in this glossary are not in fact words but descriptive phrases (such as "(like) blood" for "red").

== Pirahã and linguistic relativity ==
The concept of linguistic relativity postulates a relationship between the language a person speaks and how that person understands the world. According to Michael Frank, Daniel Everett, and others:

A total lack of exact quantity language did not prevent the Pirahã from accurately performing a task which relied on the exact numerical equivalence of large sets. This evidence argues against the strong Whorfian claim that language for number creates the concept of exact quantity. [...] Instead, the case of Pirahã suggests that languages that can express large, exact cardinalities have a more modest effect on the cognition of their speakers: They allow the speakers to remember and compare information about cardinalities accurately across space, time, and changes in modality. [...] Thus, the Pirahã understand the concept of one (in spite of having no word for the concept). Additionally, they appear to understand that adding or subtracting one from a set will change the quantity of that set, though the generality of this knowledge is difficult to assess without the ability to label sets of arbitrary cardinality using number words.

In short, in this study the Pirahã were – by and large – able to match exact quantities of objects set before them (even larger quantities), but had difficulty matching exact quantities when larger quantities were set before them and then hidden from view before they were asked to match them.

Being concerned that, because of this cultural gap, they were being cheated in trade, the Pirahã people asked Daniel Everett to teach them basic numeracy skills. After eight months of enthusiastic but fruitless daily study with Everett, the Pirahã concluded that they were incapable of learning the material and discontinued the lessons. Not a single Pirahã had learned to count up to ten or even to add 1 + 1.

Everett argues that test-subjects are unable to count for two cultural reasons and one formal linguistic reason. First, they are nomadic hunter-gatherers with nothing to count and hence no need to practice doing so. Second, they have a cultural constraint against generalizing beyond the present, which eliminates number-words. Third, since, according to some researchers, numerals and counting are based on recursion in the language, the absence of recursion in their language entails a lack of counting. That is, it is the lack of need that explains both the lack of counting-ability and the lack of corresponding vocabulary. However, Everett does not claim that the Pirahãs are cognitively incapable of counting.

== Bibliography ==
- Dixon, R. M. W.; Aikhenvald, Alexandra, eds. (1999). The Amazonian Languages. Cambridge University Press.
- Everett, Daniel (1982). "Phonetic Rarities in Pirahã". Journal of the International Phonetic Association. 12 (2): 94–96. doi:10.1017/S0025100300002498. JSTOR 44526660.
- Everett, Daniel; Everett, Keren (1984). "On the Relevance of Syllable Onsets to Stress Placement". Linguistic Inquiry. 15: 705–711.
- Everett, Daniel L. (July 1, 1986). "Pirahã". Handbook of Amazonian Languages. Vol. 1. Berlin, Germany: De Gruyter Mouton. pp. 315–317. doi:10.1515/9783110850819.200. ISBN 978-3-11-010257-4.
- Everett, Daniel (1988). "On Metrical Constituent Structure in Piraha Phonology". Natural Language & Linguistic Theory. 6 (2): 207–246. doi:10.1007/BF00134230. S2CID 170956019.
- Everett, Daniel L. (1992). A Língua Pirahã e a Teoria da Sintaxe: Descrição, Perspectivas e Teoria [The Pirahã Language and Syntactic Theory: Description, Perspectives and Theory] (Ph.D. thesis) (in Portuguese). Editora Unicamp. p. 354. ISBN 85-268-0082-5.
- Everett, Daniel (2005). "Cultural Constraints on Grammar and Cognition in Pirahã: Another Look at the Design Features of Human Language" (PDF). Current Anthropology. 46: 621–646. doi:10.1086/431525. S2CID 2223235.
- Everett, Keren (1998). "Acoustic Correlates of Stress in Pirahã". The Journal of Amazonian Languages: 104–162. (Published version of University of Pittsburgh M.A. thesis.)
- Frank, Michael C.; Everett, Daniel L.; Fedorenko, Evelina; Gibson, Edward (September 2008). "Number as a cognitive technology: Evidence from Pirahã language and cognition". Cognition. 108 (3): 819–824. doi:10.1016/j.cognition.2008.04.007. PMID 18547557. S2CID 14863459.
- Sauerland, Uli (September 2010). "Experimental Evidence for Complex Syntax in Pirahã". LingBuzz.
- Sheldon, Steven N. (1974). "Some Morphophonemic and Tone Perturbation Rules in Mura-Pirahã". International Journal of American Linguistics. 40 (4, Part 1): 279–282. doi:10.1086/465324. S2CID 143707016.
- Sheldon, Steven N. (1977). Mura-Pirahã Verb Suffixes. Brazil.
- Sheldon, Steven N. (1988). "Os sufixos verbais Mura-Pirahã" [Mura-Pirahã verbal suffixes] (PDF). Série Lingüística. 9 (2). SIL International: 147–175. Archived from the original (PDF) on 2013-10-12.
- Thomason, Sarah G.; Everett, Daniel L. (2001). "Pronoun Borrowing". Proceedings of the Berkeley Linguistic Society 27 (PDF).
