= Tariana people =

Indigenous people of Brazil

Coordinates: 0.608233°N 69.194497°W

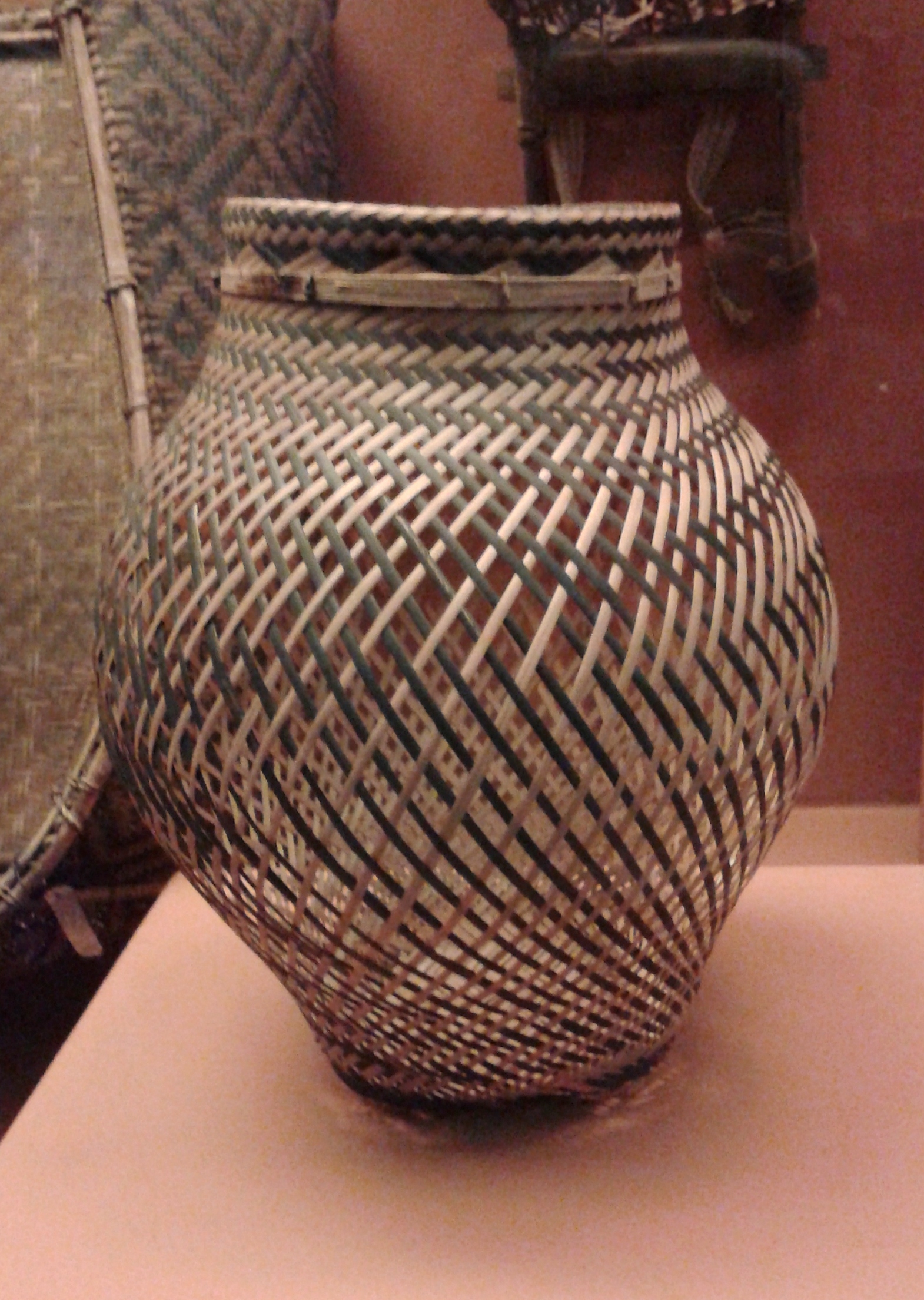
- Basket - Tariana / Rio Uaupés, 1978

Regions with significant populations
- Amazonas, Brazil (2014): 2,684
- Colombia (1988): 205

Languages
- Tucano language, Tariana language

The Tariana (Note: Other names for the Tariana are Taliáseri, Tariano, Tariáno and Tarîna. The people call themselves "Tariana".) are an Indigenous people of the Vaupés or Uaupés River in the Amazon region of Brazil and Colombia. Starting in the 19th century missionaries tried to persuade them to abandon their traditional beliefs and practices, with some level of success. The government made efforts to convert them to a "colony" system in exchange for health, education and economic benefits starting in the 1980s. They are now relatively autonomous within several Indigenous territories.

== Languages ==
The Tariana language belongs to the Arawakan linguistic family. The Tariana language, closely related to the Baniwa language, is only spoken by individuals from sibs of low rank. The reason given by the Tariana is that once they settled along the Uaupés the men of most families married Wanano and Tucano women, and their children grew up speaking their mothers' tongues. Almost all Tariana can speak Tucano, the lingua franca of the Uaupés. In 1996 there were no speakers of the Tariana language in Colombia and just 100 in Brazil.

== Location ==
As of 2010 DAI/AMTB reported a population of 1,914 in Brazil and 205 in Colombia. As of 2014 Siasi/Sesai reported that there were 2,684 Tariana in Amazonas. Indigenous territories in Brazil with Tariana populations include the Alto Rio Negro, Médio Rio Negro I, Médio Rio Negro II, Balaio and Cué-Cué/Marabitanas. In Colombia there are Tariana people on the Vaupés River and the lower Papurí River.

Location of Iauaretê on the Uaupés River

The largest numbers of Tariana live along the middle and upper reaches of the Uaupés River. The largest concentration is that of the communities in and around the village of Iauaretê, with an estimated population of about 1,300 Tariana in 2004. These include the old neighborhoods of São Miguel, Don Bosco, Santa Maria and São Pedro in the village, Campo Alto below Iauaretê on the Uaupés, Itaiaçu and Miriti above Iauaretê on the Uaupés, and Japurá, Aracapá and Sabiá on the right bank of the Papurí River near its mouth.

There are communities of Tucano, Arapaso and Pira-Tapuia between this main Tariana concentration and two other concentrations, that of Santa Rosa and Periquito further upstream on the Uaupés, and that of Ipanoré, Urubuquara, Piu-Pinu and Nova Esperança further downstream. There are also unknown numbers of Tariana living in other communities or urban centers of the Rio Negro such as the towns of São Gabriel da Cachoeira, Santa Isabel and Barcelos.

== Traditions ==
The Tariana are traditionally patrilineal, exogamous and patrilocal. That is, lineage is traced in the line of the father, they marry women from different ethnic groups, and the wife comes to live in the husband's community. Women of the Tariana may marry men of the Tucano or Piratapuyo groups. There is an inherited status in the social hierarchy, including leaders, specialists in dances and ornaments, shamans and serfs.

The ethnic groups of the Uaupés River accept the Tariana's view of themselves as "bipó diroá masí" (children of the blood of the thunder). Tariana tradition says they originated around the Uapuí waterfall on the upper Aiari River, a tributary of the Içana River from which the upper Uaupés can be reached by land. The mythology describes various places where they halted, and where the hierarchy was established between the ancestors of the different sibs of the exogamic "Tariana ethnicity". Shards of Tariana ceramics found in Jurupari date back 600 years.

== History ==
=== Early European contacts ===
Franciscan missionaries on the Uaupés River found large numbers of Tariana in the town of Ipanoré. The upper Rio Negro region was devastated by smallpox in 1740 and then by measles in 1749 and 1763. The Indians of the region were exploited by the regatões (traders), who forced them to work without pay. In the mid-19th century the governor of the newly formed Province of Amazonas initiated a program of "civilization and catechization" of the Indians in the upper Rio Negro valley. A Capuchin baptized 700 Indians and built chapels in 24 villages on the Uaupés and Içana rivers.

Helped by five Tucano and Tariana chiefs the Capuchins established ten settlements on the riverside, and used force and the promise of tools to induce the Indians to move to them and work for the government. Some were taken to work in Manaus, and children were placed in orphanages. In 1857 a military force attacked several Tariana villages. Prophetic movements in the second half of the 19th century promised to liquidate the debts of the people and absolve their sins. Three Franciscan missionaries were expelled by the Tariana in 1883 after they exhibited a mask of Jurupari on the church pulpit, which women were not allowed to see since it was used in male initiation rites.

=== Salesian missions ===
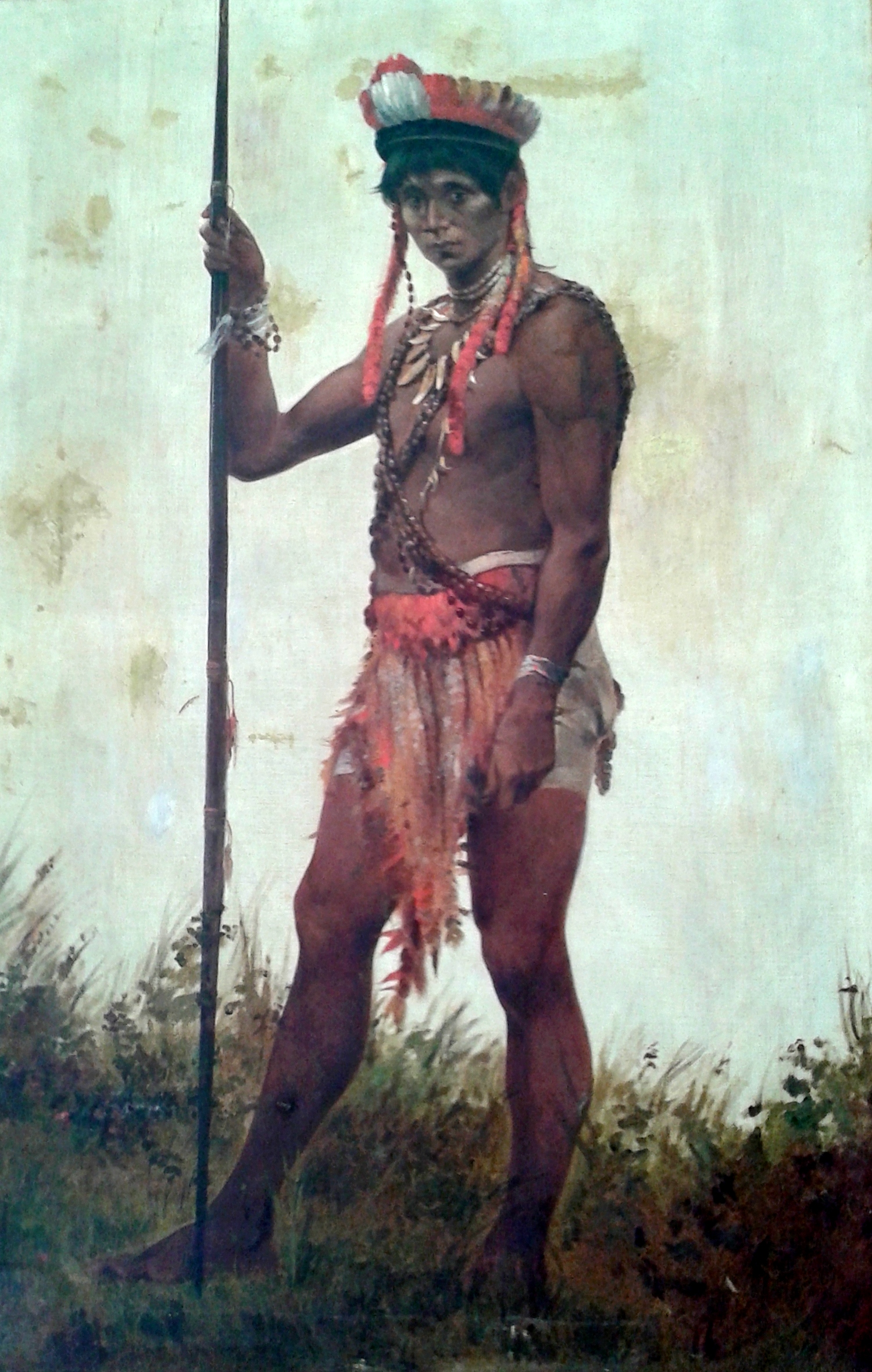
Portrait of an Indigenous chief of the Uaupés River by Décio Villares (c. 1882)

In the first decades of the 20th century Salesian missions were established on the Uaupés, and the missionaries became the local representatives of the state. They were given ample funds to convert and "civilize" the Indigenous people, and were able to reduce abuses by the Brazilian and Colombian traders on the river. When Curt Nimuendajú visited the river in 1927 he found that Iauaretê was already the main center of Tariana people, with 479 inhabitants of a 2 kilometres (1.2 mi) stretch of the river. He noted that the missionaries were intolerant of the traditional Tariana culture. There was a nearby Colombian customs post at the confluence of the Papuri and Uaupés rivers, which led to abuse by Colombian traders in the absence of Brazilian authority. At Nimuendajú's recommendation an SPI (Serviço de Proteção aos Índios: Indian Protection Service) station was established on the right (west) bank of the Uaupés opposite the Salesian mission on the left (east) bank below the point where the Papuri enters the Uaupés.

The first mission boarding school was established in May 1930, starting with three resident missionaries and 15 students. Work began on construction of housing for boys and girls, the church, hospital, lodgings, a sawmill and a pottery, using local labor. By the end of the 1930s there was a much larger staff of missionaries and lodgings for 250 Indigenous students. There were plantations and ranches, but the schools largely depended on contributions by parents of about 25 kilograms (55 lb) of flour per pupil per year. By 1950 there were 40 staff in the mission, most of them alumni of the boarding schools, the largest Salesians establishment in the Rio Negro region.

The missionaries demanded that to receive sacrament and participate in trade the Indians give up their ceremonial objects and move from their traditional malocas into individual houses grouped around a chapel. This gradually happened. Some mission students left for Colombia to work in the rubber plantations of that country, using their education to negotiate terms of labor. The SPI post seems to have closed in 1932, reopened in 1943 with a telegraph station, and closed again in 1952. There was constant tension between the SPI agents and the missionaries, who accused the SPI of encouraging "immoral" traditional practices. For nine years a large number of Indians were organized by the Salesians to build an airstrip, which opened in 1958. From now on the Brazilian Air Force supported the mission.

=== Economic changes ===
After the end of the 1960s the Colombian rubber plantations closed down, and the Indians no longer found work there. Starting from the early 1970s the town of São Gabriel da Cachoeira, two weeks by canoe downriver, began to expand due to investments under the National Integration Plan (PIN). Some of the Tariana drifted there to find work in construction, or in building the new road linking the town to the military post of Cucuí on the Venezuelan border, which was abandoned a few years later. In Iauaretê the Salesians continued to control the economy, but the educational system evolved away from a boarding school model with emphasis on crafts such as carpentry and tailoring to a day school model with the standard Brazilian curriculum. The boarding schools finally closed in 1988.

In 1976 Funrural opened a branch in Iauaretê and began paying rural pensions to people over 65. The old SPI post was reopened by the Fundação Nacional do Índio (National Indian Foundation, FUNAI), implementing the "Alto Rio Negro Plan" to improve health and agriculture and to give the Indians economic alternatives to the mission enterprises. The first Indigenous cooperative was established in 1978, and although it failed there was steady growth in independent commercial activity. New residents began to move to Iauaretê, often kin of the Tariana. During the 1980s some of the men became involved in mining, or in carrying goods for sale to miners, or in working for Colombian drug traffickers, but this work proved short-lived.

=== Colony versus Indigenous Territory ===
With the growth of the populations of the Papuri and Upper Uaupés rivers on the border between Brazil and Colombia, the region began to be seen as important in terms of national security. The First Special Border Squadron (1st PEF) was installed in Iauaretê in 1988–89. About the same time, the first Indigenous organizations become established, demanding greater autonomy. Moves were made to colonize the northern Amazon border under the Military Security Council's Calha Norte Project, and discussion began about creation of an "Indigenous Colony" in Iauaretê. Despite reservations by Indigenous leaders about the Calha Norte Project in the upper Rio Negro region a mosaic of "Indigenous Colonies" and "National Forests" was officially created in 1987–88. The territories reserved for the Indians were reduced and other territorial units were created where natural and mineral resources could be exploited. The missionaries, long in favor of "civilizing" the Indians, now began to shift to support for Indigenous rights in opposing the Calha Norte Project.

At a meeting in Taracuá in June 1988 the Uaupés and Tiquié Indians were told that if they agreed they were "acculturated" their territory would become a colony and they would receive health, education and economic benefits. The Tariana of Iauaretê had accepted this argument, but Tariana communities downstream were concerned that in a colony they would be exploited by the miners and loggers who would enter the region. After a set of ordinances created Indigenous colonies and national forests in the region the supporters of the colony model became demoralized because the promised benefits were not delivered. New Indigenous organizations in favor of more autonomy were formed. The dispute between the different groups was resolved in the mid-1990s when the federal government recognized over 11,000,000 hectares (27,000,000 acres) of Indigenous Territories in the region.

== Sources ==
- Phillips, David J, Tariana – Taliaseri (in Portuguese), Indígenas do Brasil
- Tariana (in Portuguese), ISA: Instituto Socioambiental
