= Pico da Neblina National Park =

National Park in Amazonas, Brazil

Coordinates: 0.342409°N 65.9006°W

- Parque Nacional do Pico da Neblina
- IUCN category II (national park)
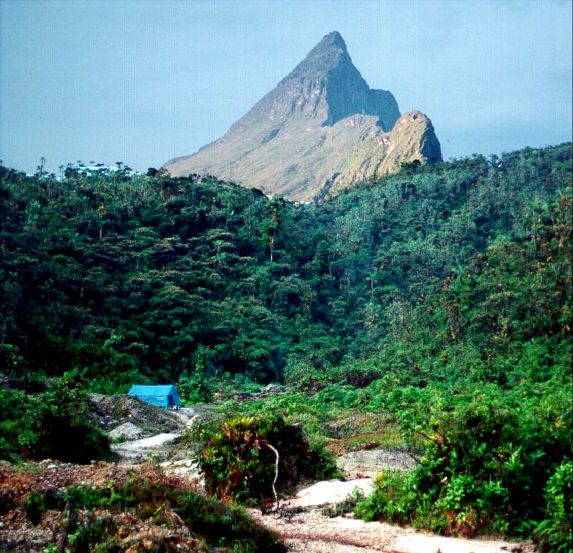
- Pico da Neblina

- Location within Brazil
- Location: State of Amazonas, Northern Brazil
- Nearest city: São Gabriel da Cachoeira
- Area: 2,252,616.84 ha (8,697.4022 sq mi)
- Designation: National park
- Established: 5 June 1979
- Governing body: Chico Mendes Institute for Biodiversity Conservation (ICMBio)

Pico da Neblina National Park (Portuguese: Parque Nacional do Pico da Neblina) is a national park in the state of Amazonas in the north of Brazil, bordering on Venezuela. It overlaps with several indigenous territories, which creates tensions over land use, as does the military presence due to the border location. The park includes lowlands around the Rio Negro, partly flooded, and mountains that include the highest peak in Brazil, after which the park is named. The wide variety of physical environments supports great biodiversity, including several endangered species.

== Location ==
The Pico da Neblina National Park is divided between the municipalities of São Gabriel da Cachoeira (29.21%) and Santa Isabel do Rio Negro (70.79%) in the state of Amazonas. It has an area of 2,252,616.84 hectares (5,566,337.4 acres). The park may be accessed by boat along the Igarapé Itamirim or the Cauaburi and Sá rivers. It may also be reached by small airplane from Manaus.

The park adjoins the Serranía de la Neblina National Park in Venezuela, to the north. To the south it is bounded by the Rio Negro. The park and the Balaio Indigenous Territory surround the 36,900 hectares (91,000 acres) Morro dos Seis Lagos Biological Reserve, created in 1990. The park would be included in the proposed Northern Amazon Ecological Corridor.

== History ==
The Pico da Neblina National Park was created on World Environment Day, 5 June 1979, by President General João Figueiredo. The park was created by decree 83.550 with an estimated area of 2,200,000 hectares (5,400,000 acres) to protect fauna, flora and natural beauty. It is classed as IUCN protected area category II (national park). At the recommendation of the Federal Public Ministry the park was closed to the public from 2003 due to uncontrolled tourism which was causing social impacts on the resident population and environmental problems. The park is administered by the Chico Mendes Institute for Biodiversity Conservation (ICMBio).

The consultative council was created by ordinance 75 of 25 June 2012. A federal court decision published on 20 July 2012 discussed a project to build a local road from km 112 of highway BR-307 to the 5th special platoon of the Brazilian army frontier force based in an area near the Ariabu village of the Yanomami Indians in the Matucará region of São Gabriel da Cachoeira. The court concluded that the constitution did not allow such a project without prior study of the environmental impact and approval by the Federal Public Ministry, Brazilian Institute of Environment and Renewable Natural Resources (IBAMA) and FUNAI. As of April 2015 there was no management plan.

== Terrain ==
The park is in the Western Amazonian geological province and is on the northwestern boundary of the Guiana Craton. Crystalline rock formations of the Guiana Plateau predominate, but there are also sedimentary rocks of the Roraima group. The terrain covers parts of the Roraima sedimentary plateau, the Amazonas-Orinoco plateau and the Rio Branco-Rio Negro pediplain.

The Roraima plateau has altitudes of 1,200 to 3,014 metres (3,937 to 9,888 ft) and includes the Pico da Neblina. The park contains the two highest peaks in Brazil, the 3,014 metres (9,888 ft) Pico da Neblina ("Fog Peak") and the 2,992 metres (9,816 ft) Pico 31 de Março. (Note: As its name suggests, the Pico da Neblina is almost always covered by clouds. For many years it was unknown to Brazil, and was first discovered by Venezuela. An overflight determined that it was in Brazil, but until the 1960s the border was undefined and the region was considered a no man's land. The border was only demarcated in 1962 and the peak recognized as part of Brazil.) The Yanomami call the peaks "Yaripo" and "Masiripiwei".

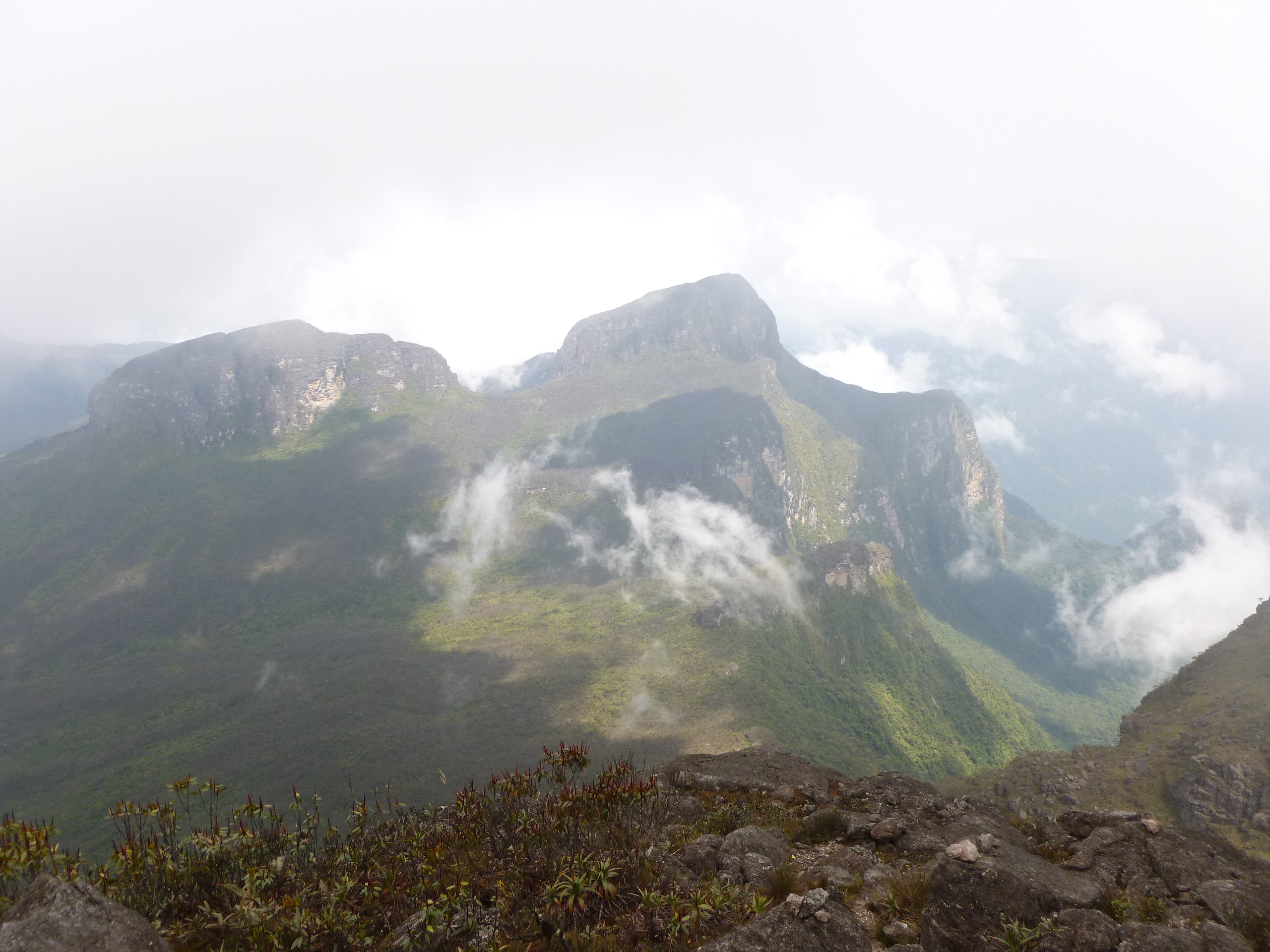
Pico 31 Março

The Amazonas-Orinoco plateau is an extensive mountainous area with altitudes from 600 to 2,000 metres (2,000 to 6,600 ft) and includes the Padre, Marié Mirim and Imeri ranges. The Rio Branco-Rio Negro pediplane is an extensive plain with altitudes from 80 to 160 metres (260 to 520 ft), based on precambrian rocks of the Guianese complex. The park is drained by left tributaries of the black water Rio Negro, including the Demiti, Cauburis and Maraiuá rivers.

== People ==
Much of the park is also part of an indigenous territory. The north and east of the park cover part of the Yanomami Indigenous Territory. The Yanomami Indigenous Territory includes about 50% of the park. The park overlaps with the Médio Rio Negro II Indigenous Territory in the south. The west of the park contains 93.73% of the 257,000 hectares (640,000 acres) Balaio Indigenous Territory, approved in 2009. The northwest overlaps with the Cué-cué/Marabitanas Indigenous Territory. There are 46 communities in the indigenous territories, including members of the Yanomami, Tucano, Tuyuca, Desano, Baniwa, Koripako, Carapanã, Baré, Tariana, Pira-tapuya, Yepamasã, Kobéwa and Warekena ethnic groups.

The overlap causes problems due to conflicting demands of park management and indigenous sovereignty. Since the park is in a border area there is a military presence, which also causes problems. The park suffers from conflicts associated with the presence of gold prospectors and extractors of lianas, which cause irreversible damage. In some areas the prospectors cause mercury contamination. There is also illegal mining, logging and extraction of forests products.

The Chico Mendes Institute for Biodiversity Conservation (ICMBio), Fundação Nacional do Índio (FUNAI: National Indian Foundation) and the Associação Yanomami do Rio Cauaburi e Afluentes (AYRCA) have been working together to reopen the park and organize tourist activity, particularly visits to the Pico da Neblina. Researchers must obtain permission from ICMBio's Biodiversity Information and Authorization System. If the research area includes indigenous land, they must also get approval from FUNAI.

== Environment ==
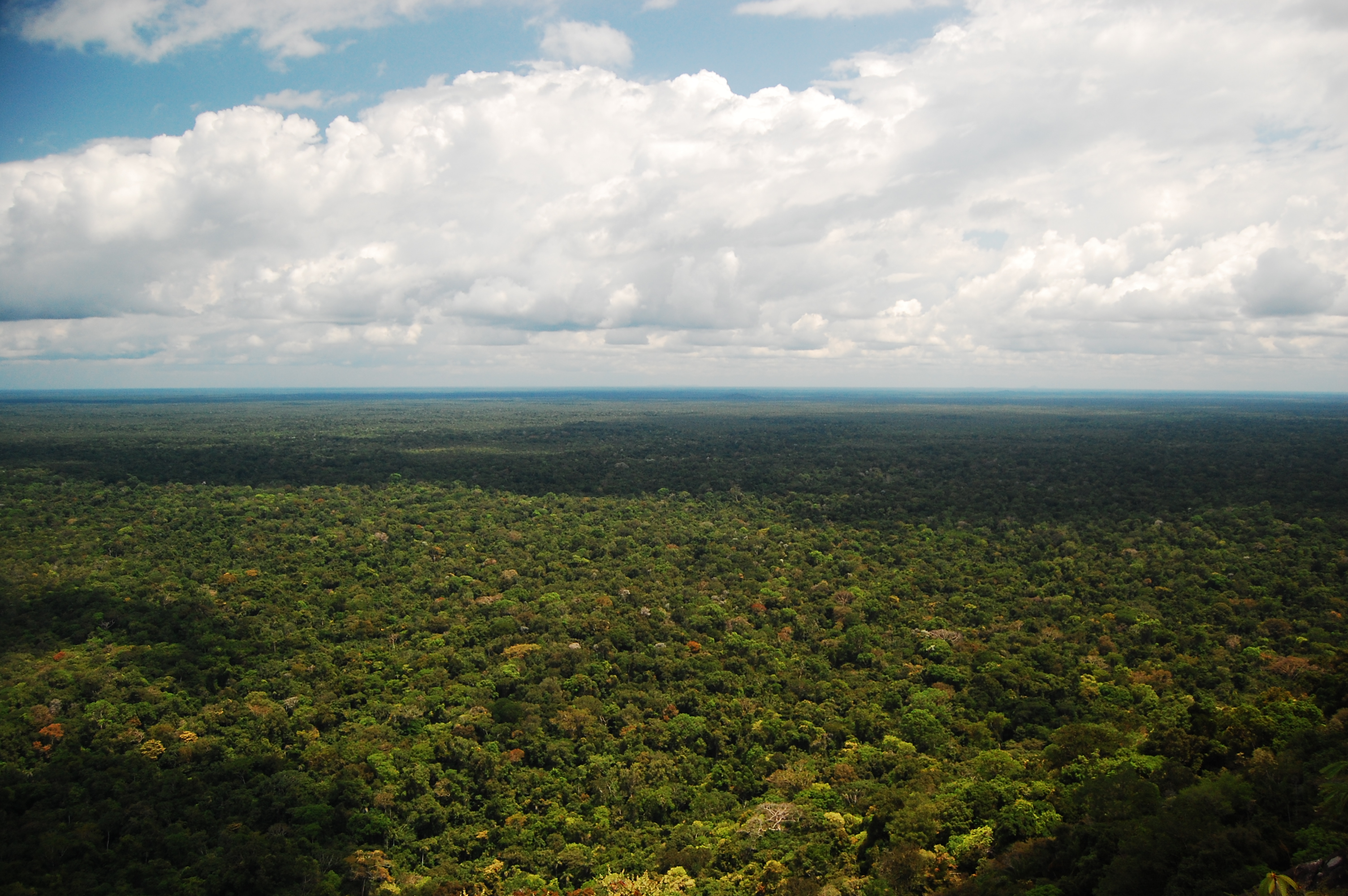
View from the peak

Average annual rainfall is 3,500 to 4,000 millimetres (140 to 160 in), with no pronounced wet or dry seasons. Temperatures average 26 °C (79 °F) and range from 9 to 40 °C (48 to 104 °F). At the highest points the temperatures may fall to 0 °C (32 °F).

The park is in the Guayanan Highlands moist forests ecoregion. It has a great variety of vegetation formations with different endemic and rare plants. The first botanists who visited the park consider that it is one of the places with the greatest biodiversity and endemism on the planet, but there has been a lack of detailed studies to confirm this. Vegetation types include campinarana (3%), dense rainforest (35%) and contact between campinarana and rainforest (62%). The vegetation formation include terra firme forests, igapós and small areas of campinarana. Submontane forests climb the first steps of the Guiana Plateau to about 1,000 metres (3,300 ft), followed by montane forests. Lichens and bromeliads are found up to 2,000 metres (6,600 ft). There are also alpine meadows in the tabular plateaus.

Common trees in the dense forest areas include Caraioa taquari, Clusia columnaris and Mauritia flexuosa. The densest formations also include Micropholis guianensis, Licania membranacea, Swartzia viridifolia, Pouteria engleri, Qualea albiflora and Astrocaryum mumbaca. Common trees in the open forest include Humiria balsamifera, Eperua purpurea, and Hevea rigidifolia. Other trees in the most open formations are Attalea racemosa, Pouteria guianensis, and Caryocar glabrum. The areas of campinarana contain caranã (Mauritia carana), tamaquaré (Caraipa grandiflora) and Pau-amarelo (Lissocarpa benthamii). Endemic flora include Didymopanax plurispicatus, Hortia neblinensis, Casearia neblinae, Gustavia acuminata and Heliamphora neblinae.

The park is home a rich variety of fauna, including several endangered species. The primate golden-backed uakari (Cacajao melanocephalus) is still abundant in the area, although its habitat has been reduced elsewhere, as is the Guianan cock-of-the-rock (Rupicola rupicola), a small orange bird that inhabits forested areas. Other species include the bush dog (Speothos venaticus), jaguar (Panthera onca), black hawk-eagle (Spizaetus tyrannus) and ornate hawk-eagle (Spizaetus ornatus), South American tapir (Tapirus terrestris), Titi monkey species, toco toucan (Ramphastos toco), black curassow (Crax alector) and grey-winged trumpeter (Psophia crepitans). The endangered white-bellied spider monkey (Ateles belzebuth) is found in the park. The park is also home to the Neblina uakari (Cacajao hosomi).

== Sources ==
- Ayres, José Márcio; Da Fonseca, Gustavo A. B.; Rylands, Anthony B.; Queiroz, Helder L.; Pinto, Luiz Paulo; Masterson, Donald; Cavalcanti, Roberto B. (2005), Os Corredores Ecológicos das Florestas Tropicais do Brasil (PDF) (in Portuguese), Sociedade Civil Mamirauá, archived from the original (PDF) on 2016-07-31
- Boubli, J. P. (1994), "The black uakari monkey in the Pico da Neblina National Park", Neotropical Primates, 2 (3)
- Parna do Pico da Neblina (in Portuguese), ICMBio, archived from the original on 2019-09-16
- PARNA do Pico da Neblina (in Portuguese), ISA: Instituto Socioambiental
- Parque do Pico da Neblina Blog (in Portuguese), ICMBio
- Parque Nacional do Pico da Neblina (in Portuguese), Via Rural, archived from the original on 2017-03-03
- REBIO Morro dos Seis Lagos (in Portuguese), ISA: Instituto Socioambiental
- Sears, Robin, South America: Southern Venezuela, northern Brazil, western Guyana, and eastern Colombia (NT0124), WWF: World Wildlife Fund
- Terra Indígena Balaio (in Portuguese), Terras Indígenas no Brasil
- Unidade de Conservação: Parque Nacional do Pico da Neblina (in Portuguese), MMA: Ministério do Meio Ambiente
