= Cué-cué/Marabitanas Indigenous Territory =

Indigenous territory in Amazonas, Brazil

- Terra Indígena Cué-Cué/Marabitanas
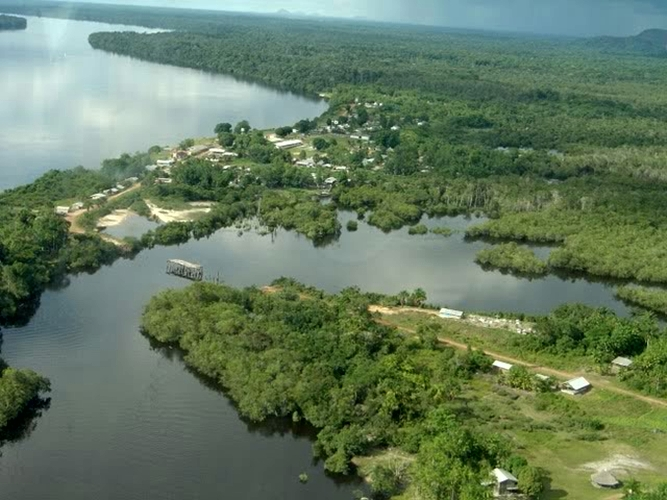
- The settlement of Cucuí

- Location within Brazil
- Nearest city: São Gabriel da Cachoeira, Amazonas
- Coordinates: 0°50′31″N 66°53′06″W
- Area: 809,000 ha (3,120 sq mi)
- Designation: Indigenous territory
- Created: 19 April 2013 (declared)

The Cué-cué/Marabitanas Indigenous Territory (Portuguese: Terra Indígena Cué-Cué/Marabitanas) is an indigenous territory in the northwest of the state of Amazonas, Brazil. There were extended delays while the territory was being identified and formally declared.

== Location ==
The Cué-cué/Marabitanas Indigenous Territory is in the municipality of São Gabriel da Cachoeira, Amazonas (Brazil). (Note: São Gabriel da Cachoeira, the third largest municipality in area with 10,974,380 hectares (27,118,300 acres), is the municipality with the largest area of protected land in Brazil. The municipality has about 30 ethnic groups speaking several different languages.) The territory has an area of 809,000 hectares (2,000,000 acres). The Rio Negro flows through the northern portion of the territory, which is bounded by Colombia on the north and Venezuela on the northeast. The Rio Negro defines the western boundary. The settlement of Cucuí on the Rio Negro is in the northern portion of the territory. Highway BR-307 runs through the eastern portion from the settlement of São Gabriel da Cachoeira up to Cucui. In the east, 25% of the territory overlaps the Pico da Neblina National Park.

As of 2016 the Upper Rio Negro municipalities of São Gabriel da Cachoeira, Santa Isabel do Rio Negro, Barcelos and Japurá had seven indigenous territories with a total population of 32,266 people. These were the Alto Rio Negro, Médio Rio Negro 1, Médio Rio Negro 2, Balaio, Cué-Cué/Marabitanas, Rio Apapóris and Rio Tea. Most were decreed in the 1990s and all had been homologated apart from the Cué-Cué/Marabitanas. The Cué-cué/Marabitanas adjoins the Balaio and Yanomami indigenous territories to the east, the Médio Rio Negro I Indigenous Territory to the south and the huge Alto Rio Negro Indigenous Territory on the other side of the Rio Negro to the west.

The Cué-cué/Marabitanas lies in the Rio Negro basin. Vegetation is in the Amazon biome, and includes campinarana in contact with rainforest. As of 2014 a total of 21,752 hectares (53,750 acres) had been deforested.

== People ==
ISA gave a population estimate of 1,645 in 1996. As of 2008 FUNAI reported that there were 1,702 inhabitants, mostly Baré and Baniwa. The families mainly lived by extracting natural products, although the subsoil of the region was rich in minerals. As of 2010 the estimated population according to GT/Funai was 1,864. This included Arapaso, Desano, Pira-tapuya, and Tucano people of the Tucano linguistic family and Baniwa, Baré, Koripako, Tariana, and Warekena people of the Arawak linguistic family. The registered indigenous organizations are the Federation of Indigenous Organizations of the Rio Negro (FOIRN) and the Wariró House of Indigenous Products of Rio Negro.

Consequently, after homologation of the reserve about 1,000 non-Indian residents, and traders, would have to leave.

== History ==
In 1984, three mineral prospecting licenses were granted in what is now the territory for phosphate, lignite, and tungsten, with areas of 2,489 hectares (6,150 acres), 7,680 hectares (19,000 acres) and 2,769 hectares (6,840 acres) respectively.

Identification of the Cué-cué/Marabitanas Indigenous Territory was started by ordinance 776 of 12 August 2003, and continued by ordinances in 2004, 2007, 2008 and 2010. The indigenous leaders repeatedly called from recognition from the Fundação Nacional do Índio (National Indian Foundation, FUNAI) and the president of Brazil over the years while identification studies were dragging out. Mércio Gomes, president of FUNAI from 2003 to 2007, was opposed to including all the land in one unit, and wanted it to be restricted to the perimeter of the left bank of the Rio Negro. He said the delimitation group had been influenced by indigenous organizations. Radical military factions were also opposed to the territory, which they saw as a threat to national sovereignty, although the military had been given guaranteed access to the territory.

Demarcation of the reserve in December 2008 gave it an area of 808,597 hectares (1,998,090 acres). The next step after publication of the 2008 demarcation report would be approval of the report, which would be followed by a 90-day period for challenges. FUNAI conditionally identified the territory by Dispatch 595 of 16 December 2011. With this action Márcio Meira, president of FUNAI, approved the demarcation study and sent it to the Ministry of Justice.

On 19 April 2013 the Federal Minister of Justice, José Eduardo Cardozo declared three indigenous territories, the 808,600 hectares (1,998,000 acres) Cué-Cué-Marabitanas, the 15,600 hectares (39,000 acres) Guanabara and the 767 hectares (1,900 acres) Tremembé de Queimadas. The Cué-cué/Marabitanas Indigenous Territory was declared by Ordinance 1.703. Cardoza denied that the identification delays had been caused by the Luiz Inácio Lula da Silva and Dilma Rousseff governments. After a 90-day deadline for challenges the territory could be confirmed as declared by the Ministry of Justice. No announcement was made about the final homologation phase, which must be done by the president.

On 12 May 2016 Dilma Rousseff was suspended while the Senate discussed impeachment, and Michel Temer became acting president. Ordinance 536 of 7 June 2016 confirmed the declaration of the territory.

== Sources ==
- Agostinho, Jaime de (28 April 2013), "AM – São Gabriel da Cachoeira é o município com maior extensão de Áreas Protegidas da União", Ecoamazônia (in Portuguese)
- Estudo de caso Demarcação das Terras indígenas no Alto Rio Negro (PDF) (in Portuguese), Movimiento Regional por la Tierra
- Sequeira, Claudio Dantas (27 December 2008), Nova reserva "fecha" fronteira do Brasil na região amazônica
- Shoichet, Catherine E.; McKirdy, Euan; Almasy, Steve (13 May 2016), Dilma Rousseff: 'I'm the victim of a great injustice', CNN
- Souza, Oswaldo Braga de (19 April 2013), Governo declara três terras indígenas, num total de 825 mil hectares (in Portuguese), ISA: Instituto Socioambiental, archived from the original on 2017-02-21
- "Terra Indígena Cué-Cué/Marabitanas", Terras Indígenas no Brasil (in Portuguese), ISA: Instituto Socioambiental
