= Iauaretê =

- Location in Brazil
- Coordinates: 0°36′28.3608″N 69°11′37.0536″W
- Country: Brazil
- Region: North
- State: Amazonas
- Municipality: São Gabriel da Cachoeira municipality
- Elevation: 105 m (344 ft)

Population
  - Total: 3,000
- Time zone: UTC−04:00

Iauareté (or Iauaretê) is a small town in São Gabriel da Cachoeira Municipality, Amazonas state in Brazil. It is located near the border with Colombia.

== History ==
Iauaretê was also a village of great importance during the most recent history of colonization in the region. Located at the confluence point of the Uaupés and Papurí rivers, sub-regions densely populated by the Tariano, Tucano, Pira-tapuya, Wanano, Arapasso, Tuyuka and other ethnic groups. It served as a point of reference for countless travelers who traveled the area since the end of the eighteenth century, for rubber tappers and merchants who exploited indigenous labor and, finally, as a base for Salesian missionaries who in 1930 implanted a great mission there dedicated to catechesisof the Indians. In five decades of operation, its boarding schools have received hundreds of indigenous students. At the end of the 1980s, an army platoon and an airstrip were built in Iauaretê, as part of a program for the defense and colonization of the North Amazonian border, the so-called Calha Norte Project.

The local population is about 3,000 people, and the aspect of the place is that of a small town, with electricity, telephone, television, schools and commerce.

== Climate ==
Iauaretê has a tropical rainforest climate (Af) with heavy to very heavy rainfall year-round. Of all the official weather stations in Brazil, it has the highest average annual rainfall.

Climate data for Iauaretê, 1981–2010 normals and extremes
Month	Jan	Feb	Mar	Apr	May	Jun	Jul	Aug	Sep	Oct	Nov	Dec	Year
Record high °C (°F)	38.0 (100.4)	39.4 (102.9)	37.1 (98.8)	37.0 (98.6)	36.2 (97.2)	39.8 (103.6)	36.0 (96.8)	36.2 (97.2)	39.0 (102.2)	37.5 (99.5)	37.5 (99.5)	38.1 (100.6)	39.8 (103.6)
Mean daily maximum °C (°F)	30.3 (86.5)	30.4 (86.7)	30.5 (86.9)	30.1 (86.2)	29.8 (85.6)	29.4 (84.9)	29.2 (84.6)	30.0 (86.0)	30.8 (87.4)	30.8 (87.4)	30.6 (87.1)	30.4 (86.7)	30.2 (86.3)
Daily mean °C (°F)	26.2 (79.2)	26.2 (79.2)	26.3 (79.3)	26.2 (79.2)	26.0 (78.8)	25.6 (78.1)	25.3 (77.5)	25.8 (78.4)	26.3 (79.3)	26.4 (79.5)	26.4 (79.5)	26.2 (79.2)	26.1 (78.9)
Mean daily minimum °C (°F)	22.1 (71.8)	22.0 (71.6)	22.1 (71.8)	22.3 (72.1)	22.2 (72.0)	21.8 (71.2)	21.4 (70.5)	21.6 (70.9)	21.8 (71.2)	22.0 (71.6)	22.2 (72.0)	22.0 (71.6)	22.0 (71.5)
Record low °C (°F)	19.2 (66.6)	18.9 (66.0)	19.2 (66.6)	19.1 (66.4)	19.0 (66.2)	16.8 (62.2)	16.4 (61.5)	—	18.8 (65.8)	19.0 (66.2)	19.5 (67.1)	18.5 (65.3)	16.4 (61.5)
Average rainfall mm (inches)	233.3 (9.19)	234.5 (9.23)	279.1 (10.99)	328.5 (12.93)	378.7 (14.91)	341.1 (13.43)	313.2 (12.33)	243.9 (9.60)	220.9 (8.70)	240.6 (9.47)	215.7 (8.49)	233.2 (9.18)	3,262.7 (128.45)
Average rainy days (≥ 1 mm)	17	16	18	20	22	21	21	19	16	16	14	17	217
Average relative humidity (%)	87.3	87.0	87.5	87.5	88.7	88.8	88.7	87.2	85.5	86.2	86.4	87.6	87.4
Mean monthly sunshine hours	109.3	89.5	106.3	96.3	98.8	93.9	108.6	123.4	131.5	127.1	124.3	115.0	1,324
Source: Instituto Nacional de Meteorologia
