= Piedra del Cocuy =

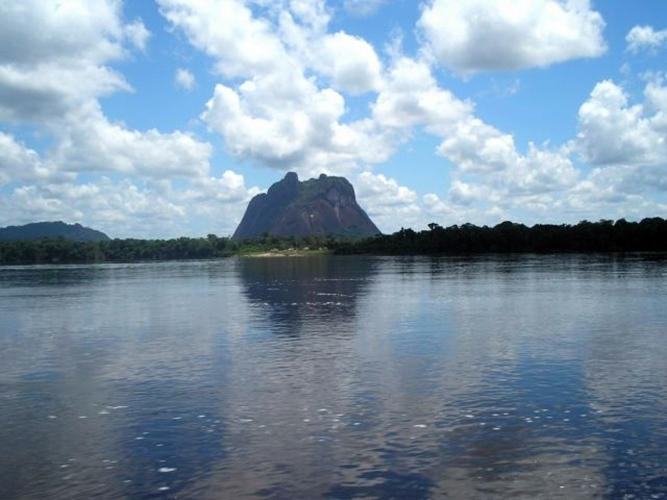

Highest point
- Elevation: 400 m (1,300 ft)
- Coordinates: 1°14′8″N 66°49′10″W

Geography
- Location within Venezuela
- Location: Amazonas State, Venezuela

Piedra del Cocuy (from Spanish: Cocuy Rock; Portuguese: Pedra do Cucuí) is a natural monument in Venezuela, located near the triple border of the country with Brazil and Colombia in the limits of the Amazon and the Orinoco Basins. Piedra del Cocuy is an inselberg made of granitic rock, its peak stands at c. 450 m a.s.l.

== Triple border ==
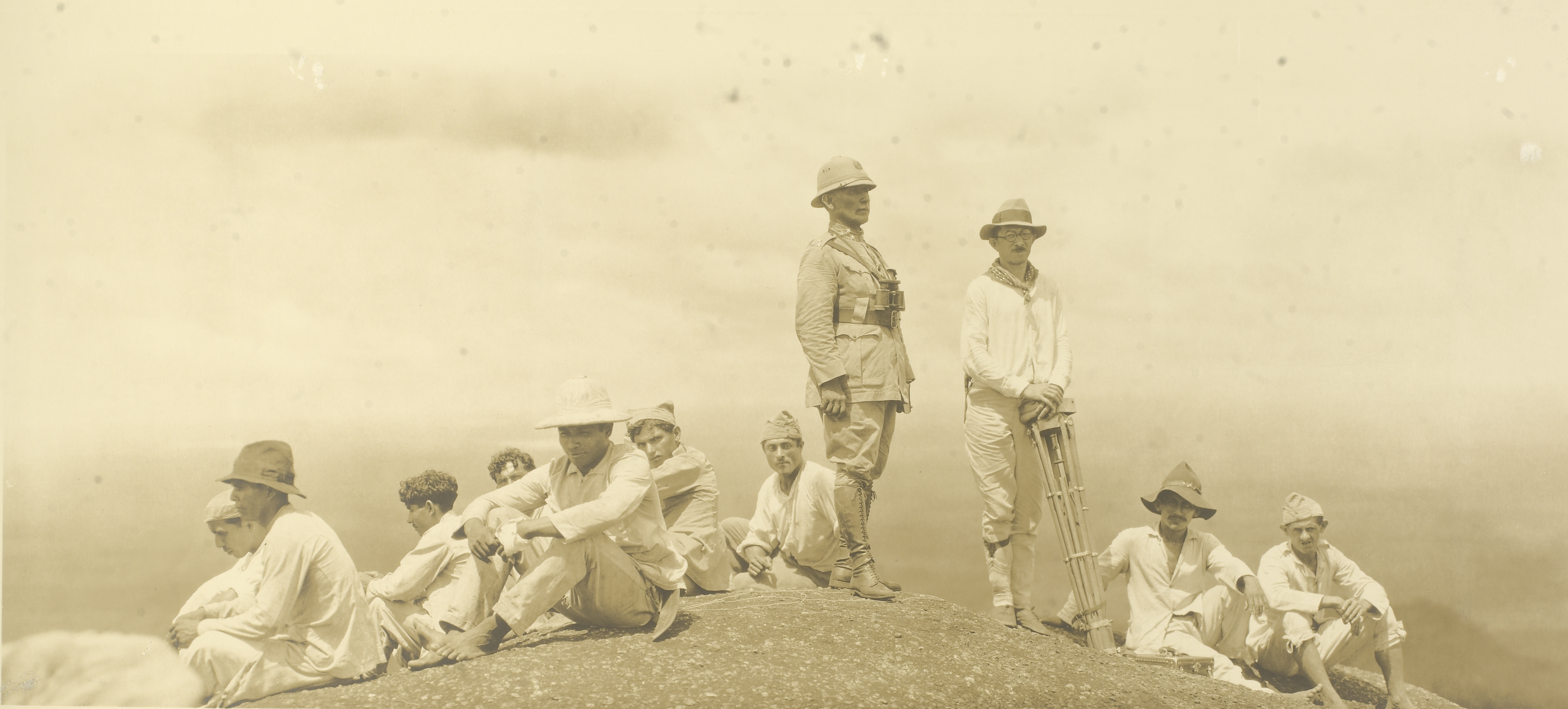
Cândido Rondon military and explorer Brazilian and his team on top of Piedra del Cocuy. Issuance of the Border Inspection Commission (1929-1930).

Administratively Piedra del Cocuy is located in the municipality of Río Negro in the Amazonas State in Venezuela. The triple border is situated 2 km to the west on the island of San José in the Rio Negro (Amazon). The adjacent municipalities from the Colombian and the Brazilian side are Inírida, Guainía and São Gabriel da Cachoeira in the Amazonas State respectively.

== Border towns ==
La Guadalupe, on the Colombian side and the western banks of the Rio Negro with a population of around 300 people, mostly Amerindians.

San Simón del Cocuy, on the Venezuelan side and Eastern banks of the Rio Negro.

Cucuí, in Brazil. It is actually a military post connected by road to the city of São Gabriel da Cachoeira.

== Transport ==
The Rio Negro is the most important waterway.

There is a road (BR-307) that connects the border post of Cucuí in the Brazilian side with the city of São Gabriel da Cachoeira.

== Economy ==
The region has been inhabited for thousands of years by indigenous groups including Baniwa, Karupaka (Kurrin), Karry (Karutama) who belong to the language family Arawak. The main economic activity has been the traditional exploitation of gold which has generated conflicts between the indigenous and miners (known as garimpeiros).
