= BR-307 (Brazil highway) =

Highway in Brazil

BR-307

Route information
- Length: 205 km (127 mi)

Major junctions
- south end: São Gabriel da Cachoeira, Amazonas
- north end: Cucuí, Amazonas

Location
- Country: Brazil

Highway system
- Highways in Brazil; Federal

BR-307 is a Brazilian federal highway in the municipality of São Gabriel da Cachoeira, Amazonas that goes from the main town on the Rio Negro to the Cucuí district some 200 kilometres (120 mi) north at the triple border with Venezuela and Colombia.

== Route ==
The road goes through indigenous land such as the Balaio Indigenous Territory and Cué-cué/Marabitanas Indigenous Territory as well as Pico da Neblina National Park. It passes through the 36,900 hectares (91,000 acres) Morro dos Seis Lagos Biological Reserve, created in 1990.

The 205 kilometres (127 mi) unpaved road is largely impassible due to neglect, destroyed bridges, and heavy rainfall.

== History ==
Along with the Trans-Amazonian Highway (BR-230) and the Perimetral Norte (BR-210), BR-307 was originally planned in the late 1960s by the military government, as part of the Plano de Integração Nacional ("National Integration Plan"). This plan had as one of its goals populating Amazônia with displaced or landless residents from the drought-prone Northeast. None of the three massive road projects were ever completed. BR-307 is still officially listed in government documents as being planned to extend a total of 1695.3 km from Marechal Thaumaturgo, Acre north to the Venezuelan border. None of the route south of the Rio Negro was ever operational.

In 2015, the former mayor of São Gabriel da Cachoeira was accused of misappropriating funds that were designated for road maintenance on BR-307.

== See also ==
- Brazilian Miracle
- Programa de Aceleração do Crescimento
