= Vaupés =

Vaupés may refer to:

- Vaupés River, a river in Colombia and Brazil, a tributary of the Negro River which flows into the Amazon River
- Vaupés Department, a department of Colombia located in the Amazon Rainforest
