= Taracuá =

Indigenous village in Amazonas, Brazil

Coordinates: 0°07′42″N 68°32′39″W

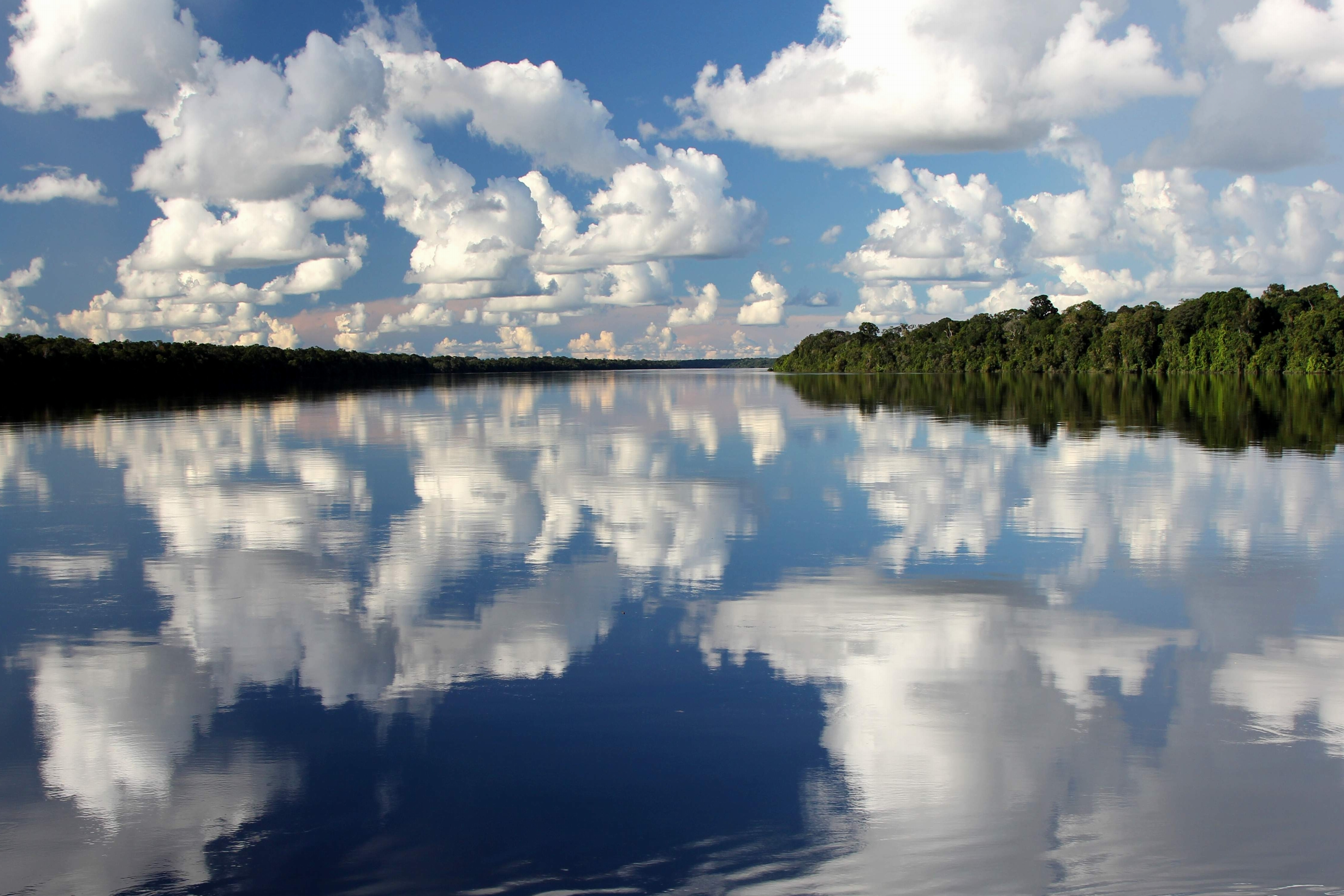
Photo of Rio Uaupes taken at the height of Taracua

Taracuá is a small village located in the municipality of São Gabriel da Cachoeira, Amazonas, Brazil.

The village is located 125 km (78 mi) from São Gabriel da Cachoeira, and has two schools.

The village inhabitants consist mainly of Tucano people, an indigenous group native to the banks of the Uaupes River.

== Location ==
Taracuá is situated on the bank of the Uaupes (Vaupés) River. It is the main location of the river's discharge, as it is set 2 kilometers upstream from where the Uaupes splits into the smaller rivers of the River Tiquié and the River Papuri.

== Schooling ==
The village of Taracuá has been the subject of many efforts to educate and bring literacy to the village.

In 2005 efforts were made by the municipality of São Gabriel, subsidized by the State Secretary of Education of the Amazon, to educate villagers from five villages which make up the "Tukano triangle" (a triangle meant to mark the borders of the Uaupes and its tributaries). Taking students from the village for primary and secondary education in São Gabriel da Cachoeira, and placing 85 students in Taracuá from the surrounding villages for education.

In March 2022, Taracuá received 2 missionaries from REIBA (Red de educación intercultural bilingue amazonica), who stayed for 2 years

In August 2022 the first degree awarding ceremony was held for the “Indigenous Licentiate Program” program by the Federal University of Amazonas (UFAM)
