= Balaio Indigenous Territory =

Indigenous territory in Amazonas, Brazil

- Terra Indígena Balaio
- Location within Brazil
- Nearest city: São Gabriel da Cachoeira, Amazonas
- Coordinates: 0°23′26″N 66°38′54″W
- Area: 257,000 ha (990 sq mi)
- Designation: Indigenous territory
- Created: 22 December 2009

The Balaio Indigenous Territory (Portuguese: Terra Indígena Balaio) is an indigenous territory in the northwest of the state of Amazonas, Brazil. The territory is home to small numbers of people from several different ethnic groups of the Arawak and Tucano linguistic families.. It is in the Amazon biome. The territory overlaps with a national park and a biological reserve, both technically fully protected areas. Mining concessions before the territory was recognized have been disallowed.

== Location ==
The Balaio Indigenous Territory is in the municipality of São Gabriel da Cachoeira, Amazonas. It has an area of 257,000 hectares (640,000 acres). The territory lies on either side of highway BR-307. It adjoins the Cué-cué/Marabitanas Indigenous Territory to the north and west. To the east it adjoins the Yanomami Indigenous Territory. An area of 242,018 hectares (598,040 acres), or 93.73% of the reserve, overlaps with the Pico da Neblina National Park. It contains the Morro dos Seis Lagos Biological Reserve.

The territory lies in the Rio Negro basin. Vegetation is in the Amazon biome, and includes Campinarana in contact with rainforest.

== People ==
Sampaio reported a population of 220 in 1991. According to GT/Funai the population was 350 in 2000. Siasi/Sesai reported that the population was 328 in 2013. These included Baniwa, Baré, Koripako and Tariana people of the Arawak linguistic family, and Desano, Cubeo, Pira-tapuya, Tucano and Tuyuca people of the Tucano linguistic family. The registered indigenous organizations are Federation of Indigenous Organizations of the Rio Negro (FOIRN) and the Wariró House of Indigenous Products of Rio Negro.

The Balaio community is at about km100 on BR-307, founded in the early 1980s. As of 2015 there were more than 23 families, mostly Tucano and Dessano, but including some Coripaco (Baniwa), Tariana and Cubeo. Most of the people were related. For several years the Association of Indigenous Women of Balaio (AMIBAL) and the Balaio Indigenous Association (AINBAL) have run painting workshops for adults and children as a way of preserving traditional knowledge and culture. FUNAI represents the government in the territory, and has a post at km55 of BR-317 at the mouth of the Iamiri River. There are two evangelical missions in the territory.

== History ==
The region contains large mineral reserves, including rich deposits of iron, manganese and niobium. The latter are important for manufacture of electronic devices such as computers and cellphones. The Companhia de Pesquisa de Recursos Minerais (CPRM) was authorized to extract minerals in a 10,044 hectares (24,820 acres) area of what is now the territory in 1975. The CPRM is owned by the Ministry of Mines and Energy. The 1988 constitution only allows mining on indigenous territories when authorized by a specific law. The Indians expressed opposition to mining.

The Morro dos Seis Lagos Biological Reserve was created by Amazonas state decree 12.836 of 9 March 1990. In October 1997 a scheduled auction of the niobium reserve was cancelled due to pressure from the Brazilian Institute of Environment and Renewable Natural Resources, which objected to opening the mine since it is within two protected areas. In 1999 the mining concession was annulled at the request of the Public Ministry of the State of Amazonas.

The Balaio Indigenous Territory was identified by ordinance 993 of 20 September 2000. The Fundação Nacional do Índio (FUNAI) conditionally approved it on 22 August 2002. In 2006 Luciano de Vito was licensed to explore for cassiterite in 9,901 hectares (24,470 acres) of the territory. The territory was declared by ordinance 2.364 of 15 December 2006. It was formally approved ("homologated") by president Luiz Inácio Lula da Silva by decree on 22 December 2009. The decree recognized the overlap with the Pico da Neblina National Park created in 1979 and Morro dos Seis Lagos Biological Reserve created in 1990, but did not comment on the implications. This was one of nine indigenous lands recognized by the president on the same date, the largest being the Trombetas Mapuera Indigenous Territory with almost 4,000,000 hectares (9,900,000 acres).

In September 2015 FOIRN arranged an Internal Assembly of the Balaio Indigenous Association (AINBAL) with about 80 attendees to initiate preparation of the Territorial and Environmental Management Plan (PGTA) of the indigenous territory. FOIRN was supported by AINBAL, the National Indigenous Foundation (Rio Negro Region), the Chico Mendes Institute for Biodiversity Conservation (ICMBio) and the Instituto Socioambiental. Representatives of DSEI/CONDISI and the municipality attended. Problems discussed included lack of road maintenance and lack of adequate transport, the energy network, and unauthorized hunters and fishers.

== Sources ==
- Farias, Elaíze (21 October 2013), "Terras indígenas da Amazônia são alvos de pesquisas sobre terras raras", Amazônia Real (in Portuguese)
- Figueiredo, Lucas (11 October 1997), "Venda da maior reserva de nióbio do mundo é adiada por 120 dias", Sucursal de Brasília (in Portuguese)
- FOIRN (30 September 2015), Iniciada a elaboração do Plano de Gestão Territorial e Ambiental da Terra Indígena de Balaio (in Portuguese), archived from the original on 26 February 2017
- Lula da Silva, Luiz Inácio (21 December 2009), Decreto de 21 de Dezembro de 2009 (in Portuguese)
- REBIO Morro dos Seis Lagos (in Portuguese), ISA: Instituto Socioambiental
- Salomon, Marta (22 December 2009), "Decreto de Lula cria área indígena com 50 mil km2", Sucursal de Brazilia (in Portuguese)
- Terra Indígena Balaio (in Portuguese), Terras Indígenas no Brasil
- Um dia para pintar o rosto e transmitir conhecimentos tradicionais para as futuras gerações em Balaio, BR 307, FOIRN: Federação das Organizações Indígenas do Rio Negro, 25 April 2015
