= Miriti =

Miriti may be,

- Miriti River
- Miriti-Tapuya language
- One of the common names for Mauritia flexuosa
