= Morro dos Seis Lagos Biological Reserve =

Biological reserve in Amazonas, Brazil

- Reserva Biológica Morro Dos Seis Lagos
- IUCN category Ia (strict nature reserve)
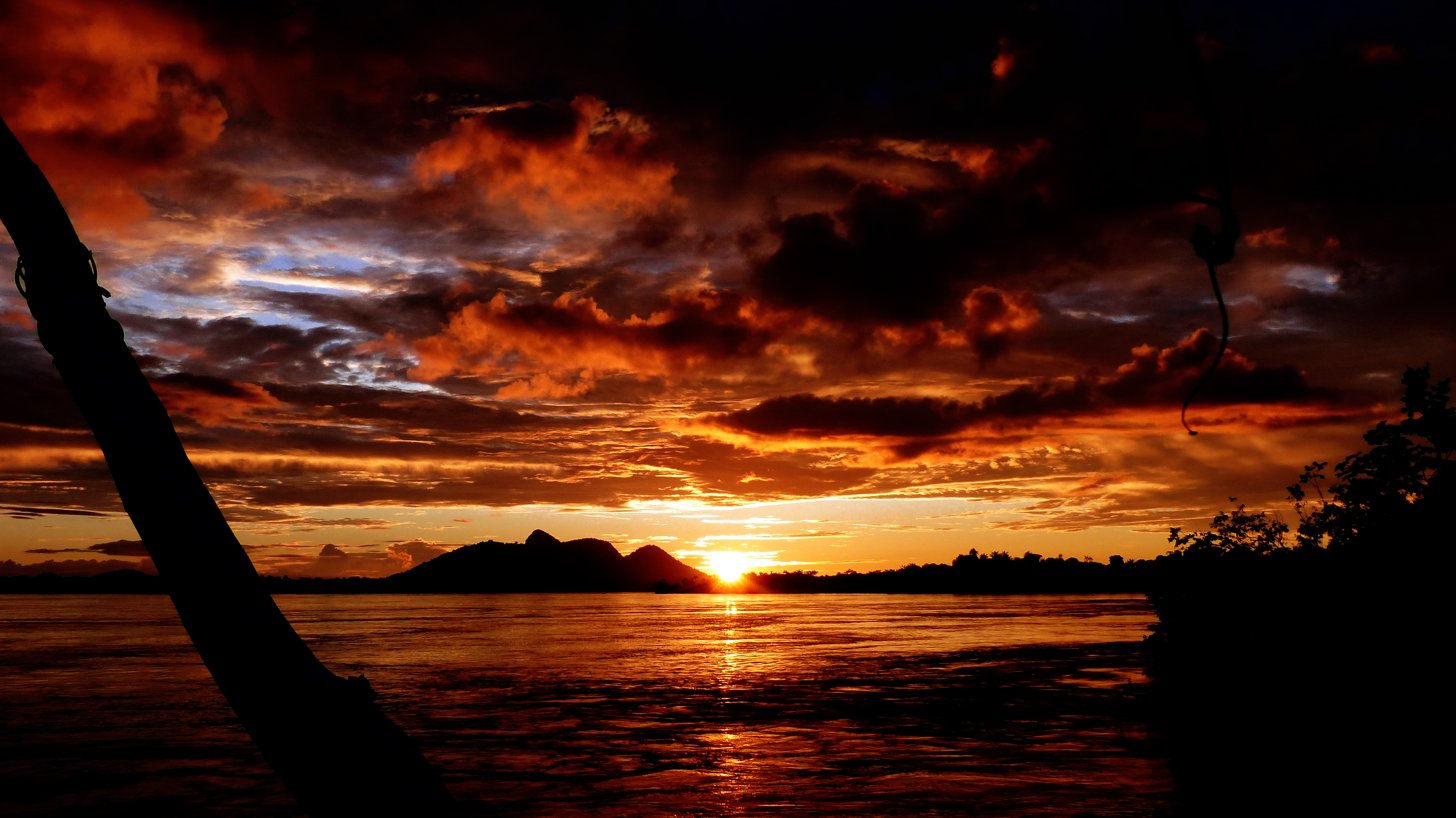
- Sunset on the Morro dos Seis Lagos

- Location within Brazil
- Nearest city: São Gabriel da Cachoeira, Amazonas
- Coordinates: 0°19′06″N 66°41′33″W
- Area: 36,900 ha (142 sq mi)
- Designation: Biological reserve
- Created: 9 March 1990
- Administrator: Secretaria de Estado do Meio Ambiente do Amazonas

The Morro dos Seis Lagos Biological Reserve (Portuguese: Reserva Biológica Morro Dos Seis Lagos) is a biological reserve in the state of Amazonas, Brazil. It protects an inselberg in the Amazon rainforest that contains valuable minerals. Mining has been prohibited since the reserve protected, and since it is in an indigenous territory.

== Location ==
The Morro dos Seis Lagos (Hill of the Six Lakes) Biological Reserve is in the municipality of São Gabriel da Cachoeira, Amazonas. It has an area of 36,900 hectares (91,000 acres). The reserve lies within the Balaio Indigenous Territory. It is surrounded by the Pico da Neblina National Park. Highway BR-307 runs through the reserve, connecting the town of São Gabriel da Cachoeira to Cucuí on the Rio Negro near the point where the river enters Brazil. The reserve is accessible by boat via the Igarapé-Mirim. It is 822 kilometres (511 mi) from Manaus.

The hill is an inselberg that may be the remains of a longer pediplain. The reserve is drained by streams of the Rio Negro basin, which form waterfalls. It contains six lakes, from which it takes its name, with different colors due to dissolved minerals. It contains caves and collapsed rock structures. There is high potential for development of ecotourism.

== History ==
The region contains large mineral reserves, including rich deposits of iron, manganese and niobium. The latter are important for manufacture of electronic devices such as computers and cellphones. The Companhia de Pesquisas e Recursos Minerais (CPRM) claimed the mineral rights based on a concession and explorations that started in 1975. The CPRM is owned by the Ministry of Mines and Energy. The 1988 constitution only allows mining on indigenous territories when authorized by a specific law. The Indians expressed opposition to mining.

The Morro dos Seis Lagos Biological Reserve was created by Amazonas state decree 12.836 of 9 March 1990. In October 1997 a scheduled auction of the niobium reserve was cancelled due to pressure from the Brazilian Institute of Environment and Renewable Natural Resources, which objected to opening the mine since it is within two protected areas. In 1999 the mining concession was annulled at the request of the Public Ministry of the State of Amazonas.

== Environment ==
Vegetation is typical of rupestrian, submontane and montane regions. Vegetation is in the contact between campinarana and rainforest. There is a thermal spring on the slope of the hill with temperature of 41 °C (106 °F). Fauna include jaguar (Panthera onca), ocelot (Leopardus pardalis) and screaming piha (Lipaugus vociferans). Visits are allowed only for research or education.

== Sources ==
- Farias, Elaíze (21 October 2013), "Terras indígenas da Amazônia são alvos de pesquisas sobre terras raras", Amazônia Real (in Portuguese)
- Figueiredo, Lucas (11 October 1997), "Venda da maior reserva de nióbio do mundo é adiada por 120 dias", Sucursal de Brasília (in Portuguese)
- Mende, Luciano (2 February 2014), "Reserva Biológica Morro Dos Seis Lagos - AM", Klima Naturali (in Portuguese)
- REBIO Morro dos Seis Lagos (in Portuguese), ISA: Instituto Socioambiental
- Reserva Biológica Morro dos Seis Lagos (in Portuguese), Via Rural, archived from the original on 2017-02-24
- "São Gabriel da Cachoeira", Noticiasdeturismo.com.br (in Portuguese), archived from the original on 2017-02-24
