= Xie River (Brazil) =

Xié River
- Mouth location in Brazil
- Native name: Rio Xié (Portuguese)

Location
- Country: Brazil

Physical characteristics
- Source
  - location: São Gabriel da Cachoeira, Amazonas, Brazil
  - coordinates: 1°20′53″N 67°32′26″W
- Mouth
  - coordinates: 0°55′22″N 67°12′04″W

Basin features
- River system: Rio Negro

The Xié River (Portuguese: Rio Xié) is a river of Amazonas state in north-western Brazil. It is a right tributary of the Rio Negro.

The river flows through the 7,999,000-hectare (19,770,000-acre) Alto Rio Negro Indigenous Territory, created in 1998. The majority of the population of the Xié River are Baré and Werekena people.

== See also ==
- List of rivers of Amazonas
