= Baré people =

Coordinates: 1.338682°N 67.239410°W

Baré
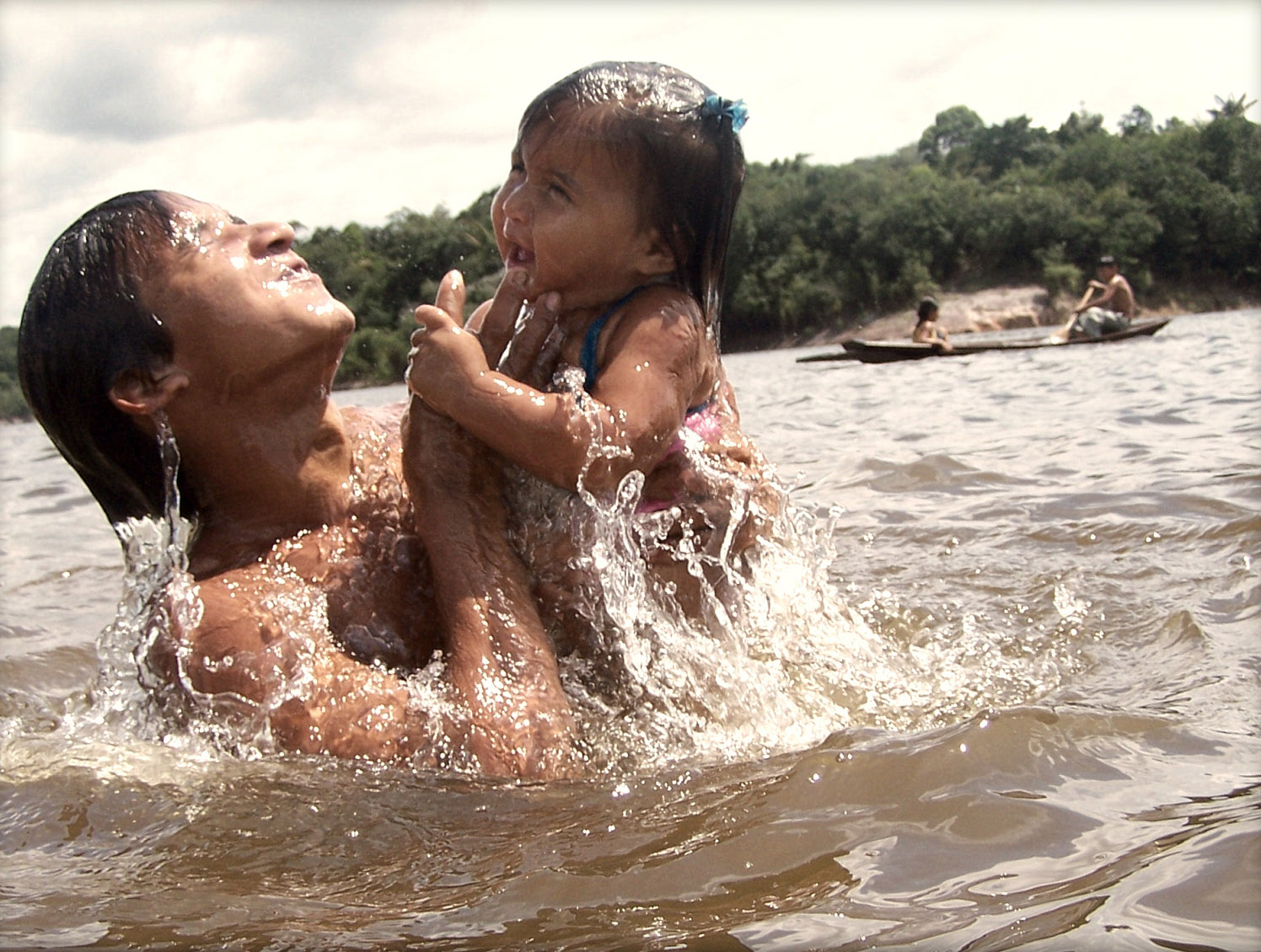
- Baré people bathing in the Cuieiras River

Total population
- 16,516 (2014)

Regions with significant populations
- Brazil (Amazonas) 11,472 (2014)
- {{{region2}}}: Venezuela 5,044 (2011)

Languages
- Nheengatu, Baré

Religion
- Protestant, Catholic, Traditional tribal religion

The Baré, or Hanera are an Indigenous people of northwest Brazil and Venezuela. For many years they suffered from violent exploitation by Portuguese and Spanish merchants, forced to work as debt slaves. They moved often to try to avoid the merchants. Today most live by agriculture, hunting, fishing and gathering, and extract piassava fiber for income to buy goods from traders.

== Languages and population ==
The Baré (Note: Some say that "Baré" means companion, while others say it comes from "bari", or “white.”) originally spoke the Baré language, Arawakan languages, but today speak Nheengatu, a lingua franca spread by the Carmelites in the colonial period. However, Baré is much more endangered, having only two speakers as of 2012. According to the Siasi/Sesai, in 2014 there were 11,472 of the Baré people in Amazonas, Brazil. The 2011 national census of Venezuela reported 5,044 Baré people.

== Locations ==
Location of Cumati waterfall on the Xié River

The Baré and in Brazil mostly live on the Xié River and the upper reaches of the Rio Negro. Most were forced to move here due to violent contact and exploitation by Europeans. They form the bulk of the population of the Xié River and the upper Rio Negro above the mouth of the Vaupés River. The communities downstream from the Cumati waterfall on the Xié are mostly Protestant, influenced by the New Tribes Mission with its base near Vila Nova, near the mouth of the river. Those upstream from the waterfall are mostly Catholic. Both groups still use shamans, prohibited by the missionaries, who follow traditional practices for curing.

Most of the people live in small communities of log houses built around a wide area of clean sand. Some settlements have a Catholic or Protestant chapel, a small school and perhaps a medical station, while other only have houses. The largest settlements are Cucuí, Vila Nova and Cué-Cué in the Cué-cué/Marabitanas Indigenous Territory. During most of the year the communities are mostly engaged in agriculture, hunting, fishing and gathering. The main source of cash comes from extraction of piassava fiber. This is used by buy goods from small or medium traders. The towns of Santa Isabel and São Gabriel da Cachoeira, particularly the latter, are magnets to people looking for better education, paid work and access to cheaper goods than those provided by trading boats on the rivers.

In Venezuela the remaining Baré live along the Casiquiare canal, with small numbers in Puerto Ayacucho, San Fernando de Atabapo, Solano, San Carlos de Río Negro, Santa Rosa de Amanadon and Santa Lucía.

== Traditional life ==
The Baré people once lived along the Río Negro upstream from the present location of Manaus to the Casiquiare canal and the Pasimoni River. During the long struggle with European colonialists much of their culture has been forgotten and most of their precolonial artifacts lost. Like related groups on the Rio Negro they probably practiced slash-and-burn agriculture, hunted small game using blowpipes and bows and arrows, gathered forest products and fished using harpoons, arrows, hooks, traps and nets. They would have manufactured their own tools, wooden boats and paddles, textiles, hammocks, baskets and pottery. For weaving they used the fibers of cumare, curagua, and moriche, which they dried in the sun and dyed red, purple and yellow. For fishing lines they used chiquichique fiber.

== History ==
Contact with merchants of extractive products began in the 19th century. To the Baré, there would have been little difference between the authorities and the merchants who forced them to work in extraction of products such as cocoa, salsaparilha, piaçaba, puxuri, balata and rubber. Some were forced to migrate and work in new areas by the merchants, and some fled from the merchants and moved repeatedly to avoid contact.

== Sources ==
- "Baré", Povos Indígenas no Brasil (in Portuguese), ISA: Instituto Socioambiental
- "Discover the people of the Orinoco#Baré", orinoco.org, archived from the original on 2010-08-02
