= Arapaso language =

Extinct language of Brazil

Arapaso
- Kõ'neá
- Native to: Brazil
- Region: Amazonas (Brazilian state)
- Ethnicity: 448 Arapásu (2014)
- Extinct: (date missing)
- Language family: Tucanoan: Eastern; Eastern Eastern; Eastern Eastern II; Kotiria–Piratapuyo; Piratapuyic; Arapaso–Miriti; Arapaso

Language codes
- ISO 639-3: arj
- Glottolog: arap1275
- ELP: Arapaso
- Arapáso is classified as Extinct by the UNESCO Atlas of the World's Languages in Danger.

Arapaso (Arapaso: Kõ'neá, Arapafo) is an extinct, poorly attesed eastern Tucanoan language of Brazil, closely related to Miriti, and once spoken by the Arapaso people, who numbered 448 in 2014.

== Name ==
=== Etymology ===
The name Arapásu is derived from the Nheengatu name for a species of woodpecker. The native Arapaso self-designation Kõ'neá refers to the same.

== Geographic distribution ==
Arapaso was spoken in the northwestern Amazonas State in the Upper Río Negro region. Speakers were found in the Vale de Uaupés, within the Alto Rio Negro Indigenous Territory and the Terra Indígena Médio Rio Negro II.

== Status ==
Theodor Koch-Grünberg thought that the Arapaso were a subdivision of the Tucano people. All members of the ethnic group were bilingual in Tukano, and the community was undergoing a language shift to it. Younger generations have also received schooling in Portuguese.
