= Serra das Traíras =

Mountain range in Brazil

Coordinates: 13°19′43″S 47°46′23″W

Serra das Traíras is a mountain range in southern Tocantins, Brazil. An unnamed peak at the municipality of Paranã is the highest point in Tocantins, reaching 1,340 meters (4,400 feet).

In August 2021, the region suffered violent wildfires which required in excess of four days of aggressive wildfire suppression work to be resolved.
