= Içana River =

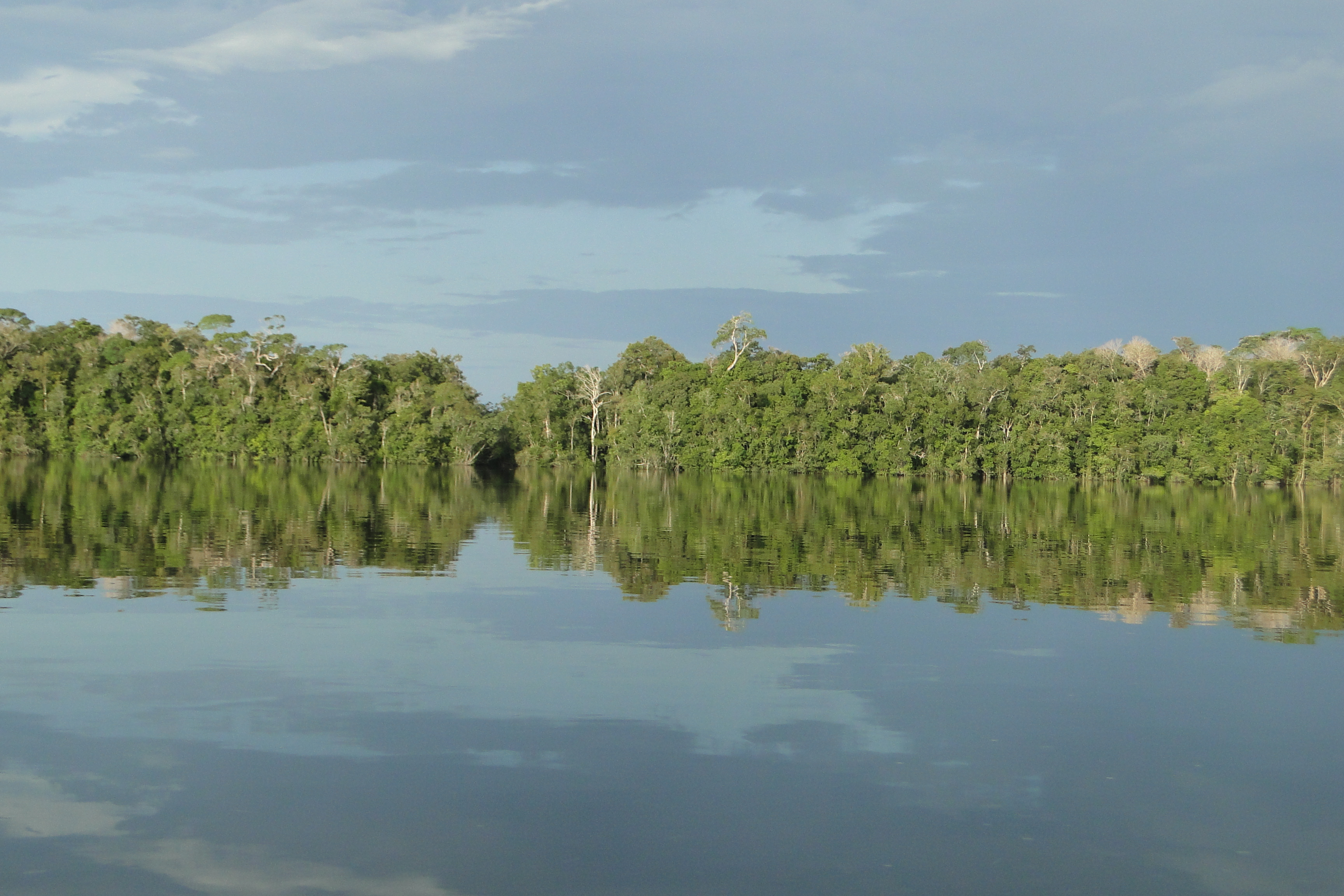

Location
- Countries: Brazil; Colombia

Physical characteristics
- Source
  - location: Guainía Department, Colombia
  - elevation: 215 m (705 ft)
- Mouth: Río Negro
  - coordinates: 0°29′N 67°20′W
  - elevation: 67 m (220 ft)
- Length: 580 km (360 mi)
- Basin size: 35,675.3 km^{2} (13,774.3 sq mi)
- Discharge
  - location: Amazonas state, Brazil (near mouth)
  - average: 2,278.9 m^{3}/s (80,480 cu ft/s)

Basin features
- Tributaries
  - left: Aiari

Içana River (río Isana/rio Içana in Spanish and Portuguese) is a tributary of the Rio Negro in South America. Its source is in the Guainía Department of Colombia, where it is known as the Isana River. From its source, it flows mostly east until it reaches the border between Colombia and Brazil, where the river forms a small part of the boundary between the two countries. From the border, it flows mostly southeast through Amazonas state until it joins the Rio Negro at Missão Boa Vista.

In Brazil, the river flows through the Alto Rio Negro Indigenous Territory, which was created in 1998.

== See also ==
- List of rivers of Amazonas
