= Warekena =

Indigenous people of Brazil

The Warekena are an Indigenous people of Brazil who traditionally speak the Warekena language, one of the Arawakan languages, but today speak Nheengatu, a lingua franca spread by the Carmelites in the colonial period. Some communities of the Upper Xié still speak Warekena. Warekena people mostly live on the Xié River and the upper reaches of the Rio Negro. Most were forced to move here due to violent contact and exploitation by Europeans. They form the bulk of the population of the Xié River and the upper Rio Negro above the mouth of the Vaupés River.More than 60% of the indigenous people of the Xié are Werekena. The communities downstream from the Cumati waterfall on the Xié are mostly Protestant, influenced by the New Tribes Mission with its base near Vila Nova, near the mouth of the river. Those upstream from the waterfall are mostly Catholic. The Warekena still use shamans, prohibited by the missionaries, who follow traditional practices for curing.

== History ==
The first contacts of the Warekena with European colonists probably date to the early 18th century. The Jesuit Ignácio Szentmatonyi wrote in 1753 that the "Verikenas" inhabited the River "Issié" (Xié) and spoke their own language. Later writers said they had adapted Hebrew names, used knotted cords to communicate messages, made large holes in their ear lobes and were cannibals. Contact with merchants of extractive products began in the 19th century. To the Werekena there would have been little difference between the authorities and the merchants who forced them to work in extraction of products such as cocoa, salsaparilha, piaçaba, puxuri, balata and rubber. Some were forced to migrate and work in new areas by the merchants, and some fled from the merchants and moved repeatedly to avoid contact.

The Italian Count Ermano Stradelli descended the Rio Negro from Cucuí in 1881. He wrote that the Xié River was almost deserted. Possibly the indigenous people were living in the headwaters and small streams to avoid destructive contact with whites. At the start of the 20th century many families that had moved to Venezuela returned to Brazil to escape the merchants who were violently exploiting them in Guainia and Casiquiare. In Brazil they again had to face exploitation by the military of Cucuí and by merchants seeking piassava, rubber and sorva. Often an Indian would become indebted to a merchant, and would then be forced to work to pay the interest, in effect as a slave. Some were taken to rubber plantations on the lower Rio Negro. However, many white traders married indigenous women who bore their children, creating ties of kinship.
