= Miriti-Tapuya language =

Extinct Tucanoan language of Brazil

Miriti-Tapuya
- Neenoá
- Native to: Brazil
- Ethnicity: 94 Miriti-Tapuya (2017)
- Extinct: by 1947
- Language family: Tucanoan: Eastern; Eastern Eastern; Eastern Eastern II; Kotiria-Piratapuyo; Piratapuyic; Arapaso–Miriti; Miriti-Tapuya

Language codes
- ISO 639-3: mmv
- Glottolog: miri1270
- ELP: Mirití
- Mirití Tapuia is classified as Critically Endangered by the UNESCO Atlas of the World's Languages in Danger

Miriti-Tapuya (Miriti: Neenoá) is an extinct Tucanoan language of Brazil, once spoken by the Miriti-Tapuya people. The Miriti-Tapuya had switched to Tucano completely by 1947 and elders then could only remember a half-dozen words. They said, however, that their language was very similar to the Arapaso language. A group of Miriti-Tapuya were said to have fled to the Japurá River in Colombia, possibly around the late 19th century. Álcionílio Brüzzi Alves da Silva (1962) thought this group might have still spoken the language.

== Vocabulary ==
The following are the scant vocabulary items still remembered by Miriti-Tapuya elders in 1947 and recorded in Silva (1962).

Miriti-Tapuya vocabulary
gloss	Miriti-Tapuya
father	kö-kâ
mother	yõ
son	maxkõga
grandfather	kö-Ro
daughter	maxkõga
soap	sa
paternal uncle	möãma
paternal aunt	möãmo
fire	maryé tukáro
