= Papurí River =

Papurí

Location
- Countries: Brazil; Colombia

Physical characteristics
- Source
  - location: Vaupés Department, Colombia
- Mouth
  - coordinates: 0°36′N 69°11′W

The Papurí River (Spanish: Río Papurí, Portuguese: Rio Papuri) is a river in South America. It emerges in the Vaupés Department of Colombia and flows east, forming part of the international boundary between Colombia and the Amazonas state of Brazil. On the border, it flows into the Uaupés River.

== See also ==
- List of rivers of Amazonas
