= Cucuí =

Brazil in São Gabriel da Cachoeira, Brazil

- District
- Location within Brazil
- Coordinates: 1°12′N 66°50′W
- Country: Brazil
- State: Amazonas
- Municipality: São Gabriel da Cachoeira
- Named for: Piedra del Cocuy, a hill across the border in Venezuela
- Climate: Af

Cucuí is a Brazilian district within the municipality of São Gabriel da Cachoeira, on the border with the Amazonas state of Venezuela (within the municipality of Río Negro Municipality) and the Guainía department of Colombia (within the municipality of San Felipe). The district is located slightly east of the Rio Negro, which flows through the Brazil–Colombia–Venezuela tripoint and forms the border between Colombia and Venezuela. The district serves as a checkpoint and crossing point for the Brazil–Venezuela and for the Brazil–Colombia borders.
