= São Gabriel da Cachoeira =

Municipality of Amazonas, Brazil

- Municipality
- The Municipality of São Gabriel da Cachoeira
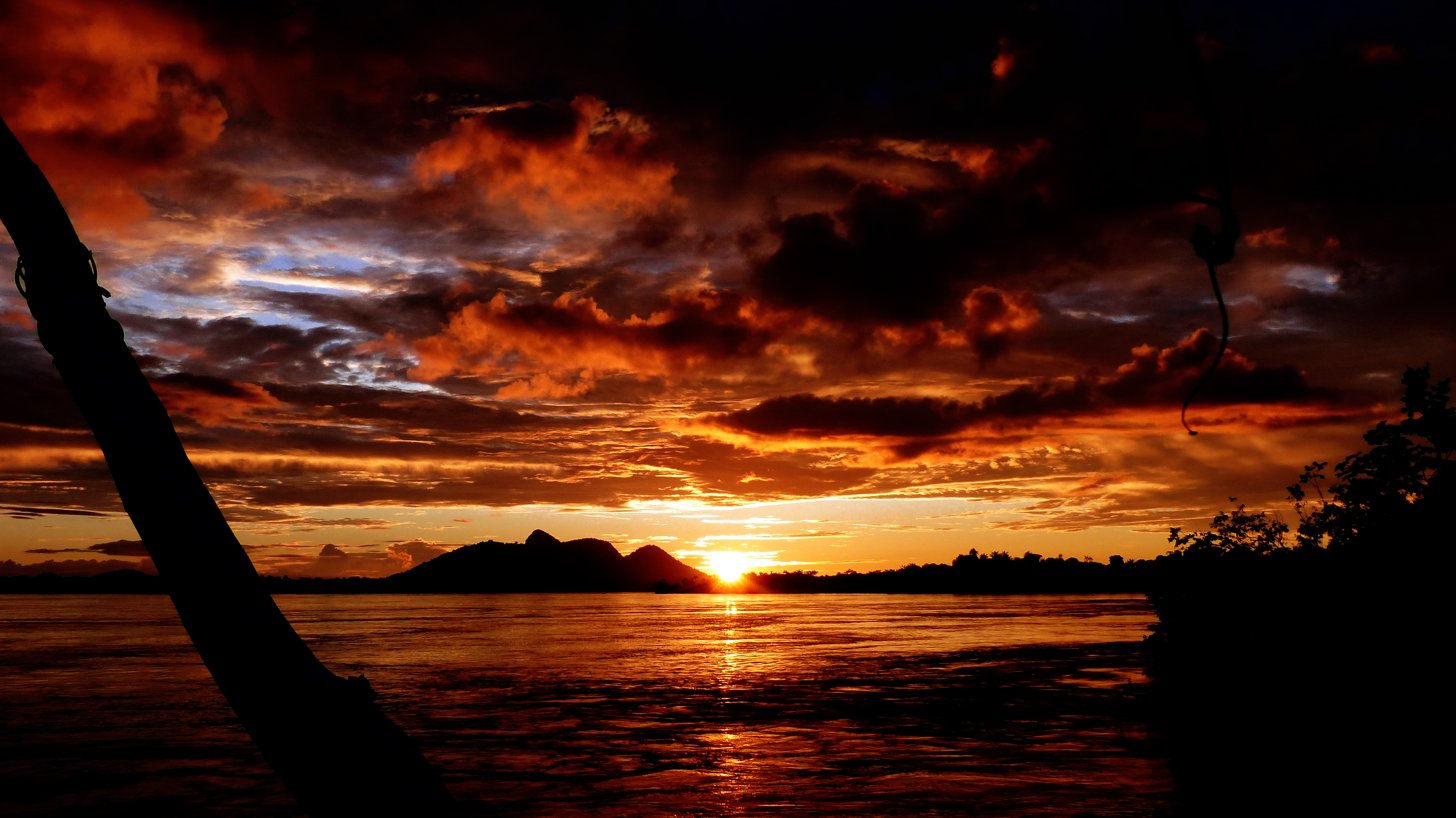
- Sunset on the Hill of Six Lakes in the background in São Gabriel da Cachoeira, North of Amazonas State, Brazil.

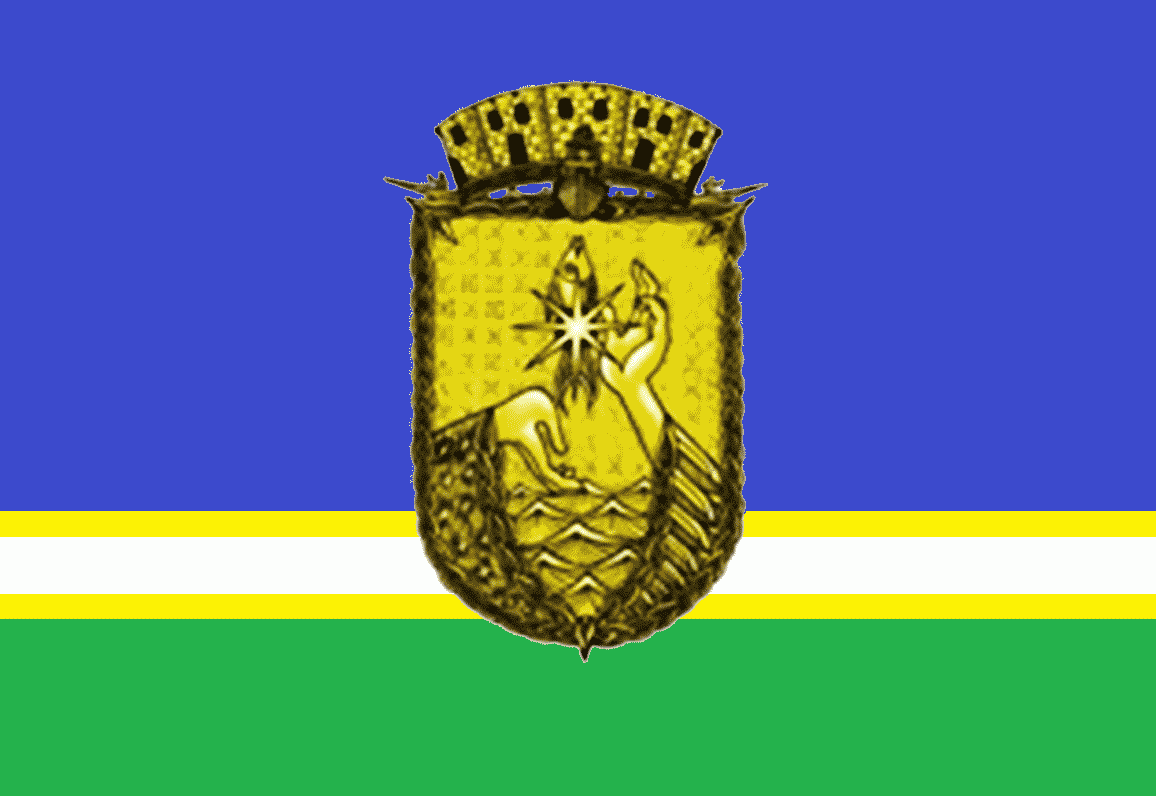
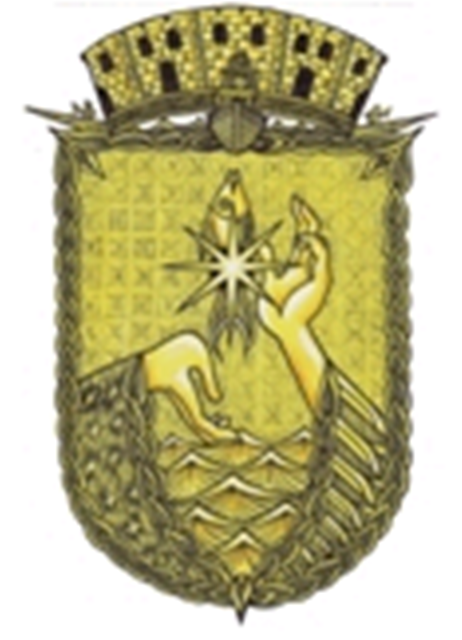
- Flag Coat of arms
- Nickname: Uaupés
- Location in the State of Amazonas

- Location in Brazil
- Coordinates: 00°07′09″S 67°04′58″W
- Country: Brazil
- Region: North
- State: Amazonas
- Founded: 3 September 1668

Government
  - Mayor: Clóvis Moreira Saldanha (Workers' Party)

Area
  - Total: 109,185 km^{2} (42,157 sq mi)
- Elevation: 92 m (302 ft)

Population (2022)
  - Total: 51,795
  - Density: 0.47/km^{2} (1.2/sq mi)
- Time zone: UTC−4 (AMT)
- HDI (2000): 0.673 – medium
- Website: http://www.camarasgc.am.gov.br/

São Gabriel da Cachoeira is a municipality located on the northern shore of the Rio Negro River, in the region of Cabeça do Cachorro, Amazonas state, Brazil.

== History ==
The city was founded in 1668 as an aldea by Franciscan Friar Teodósio da Veiga and Captain Pedro da Costa Favela on the Rio Negro, near the mouth of the Rio Aruím. In 1761, a fort was built on the location, and the settlement became the town of São Gabriel da Cachoeira. Between 1952 and 1966, it was officially called Uaupés, after the nearby Vaupés River.

In 2003, Nheengatu became an official language, with Baníwa, Yepá-masã, and Portuguese in São Gabriel da Cachoeira.

== Demography ==
Most of the inhabitants of São Gabriel da Cachoeira are indigenous people. The city's population is somewhere around 13,000, but the entire region has 51,795 people (2022), scattered over 109,185 km^{2}, mostly indigenous peoples in surrounding tribes and villages.

Most of the non-indigenous residents of the city are affiliated with the Brazilian army, usually serving a term of two years or more.

| Color/Race | Percentage |
|---|---|
| Indigenous Amerindian | 76.9% |
| Mixed | 14.4% |
| White | 5.8% |
| Black | 2.6% |
| Asian | 0.3% |

Source: Census 2010

== Geography ==
São Gabriel da Cachoeira is the third largest municipality in Brazil by territorial area, and the second largest in Amazonas. It is also the northernmost city of Amazonas, and part of its territory is within the Pico da Neblina National Park. However, the peak itself is located in Santa Isabel do Rio Negro, and São Gabriel da Cachoeira is in the lowlands. It is not far from the equator, and the climate is correspondingly hot and humid.

The city is served by São Gabriel da Cachoeira Airport.

The municipality contains the 36,900-hectare (91,000-acre) Morro dos Seis Lagos Biological Reserve, created in 1990. The reserve is within the 257,000-hectare (640,000-acre) Balaio Indigenous Territory, approved in 2009. The municipality also contains the 809,000-hectare (2,000,000-acre) Cué-cué/Marabitanas Indigenous Territory, declared in 2013. It contains the greater part of the 7,999,000-hectare (19,770,000-acre) Alto Rio Negro Indigenous Territory, created in 1998.

=== Climate ===
Climate data for São Gabriel da Cachoeira (1981–2010)
| Month | Jan | Feb | Mar | Apr | May | Jun | Jul | Aug | Sep | Oct | Nov | Dec | Year |
|---|---|---|---|---|---|---|---|---|---|---|---|---|---|
| Record high °C (°F) | 38.8 (101.8) | 40.0 (104.0) | 38.7 (101.7) | 37.6 (99.7) | 37.8 (100.0) | 38.1 (100.6) | 37.0 (98.6) | 37.5 (99.5) | 39.0 (102.2) | 38.8 (101.8) | 38.1 (100.6) | 38.0 (100.4) | 40.0 (104.0) |
| Mean daily maximum °C (°F) | 32.2 (90.0) | 32.5 (90.5) | 32.6 (90.7) | 32.2 (90.0) | 31.2 (88.2) | 30.8 (87.4) | 30.8 (87.4) | 31.9 (89.4) | 32.7 (90.9) | 32.8 (91.0) | 32.9 (91.2) | 32.4 (90.3) | 32.1 (89.8) |
| Daily mean °C (°F) | 26.4 (79.5) | 26.4 (79.5) | 26.6 (79.9) | 26.4 (79.5) | 25.9 (78.6) | 25.4 (77.7) | 25.2 (77.4) | 25.7 (78.3) | 26.2 (79.2) | 26.5 (79.7) | 26.6 (79.9) | 26.4 (79.5) | 26.1 (79.0) |
| Mean daily minimum °C (°F) | 22.3 (72.1) | 22.4 (72.3) | 22.4 (72.3) | 22.4 (72.3) | 22.1 (71.8) | 21.6 (70.9) | 21.2 (70.2) | 21.4 (70.5) | 21.8 (71.2) | 22.2 (72.0) | 22.3 (72.1) | 22.3 (72.1) | 22.0 (71.6) |
| Record low °C (°F) | 18.3 (64.9) | 17.7 (63.9) | — | 18.7 (65.7) | 18.5 (65.3) | 17.0 (62.6) | 15.0 (59.0) | 17.2 (63.0) | 17.9 (64.2) | 18.4 (65.1) | 18.8 (65.8) | 19.1 (66.4) | 15.0 (59.0) |
| Average precipitation mm (inches) | 295.7 (11.64) | 239.0 (9.41) | 246.9 (9.72) | 264.5 (10.41) | 346.5 (13.64) | 294.1 (11.58) | 253.2 (9.97) | 209.8 (8.26) | 181.6 (7.15) | 195.5 (7.70) | 204.2 (8.04) | 273.0 (10.75) | 3,004 (118.27) |
| Average precipitation days (≥ 1.0 mm) | 19 | 15 | 17 | 17 | 21 | 20 | 18 | 17 | 14 | 14 | 14 | 17 | 203 |
| Average relative humidity (%) | 87.3 | 87.1 | 87.3 | 87.6 | 89.3 | 89.3 | 88.6 | 87.1 | 85.8 | 85.6 | 86.4 | 87.6 | 87.4 |
| Mean monthly sunshine hours | 140.7 | 124.6 | 129.0 | 115.4 | 107.1 | 107.1 | 127.6 | 142.9 | 154.8 | 149.6 | 145.0 | 134.9 | 1,578.7 |
Source: Instituto Nacional de Meteorologia

== See also ==
- Roman Catholic Diocese of São Gabriel da Cachoeira
