= Tucano people =

Tucano
ye’pâ-masa
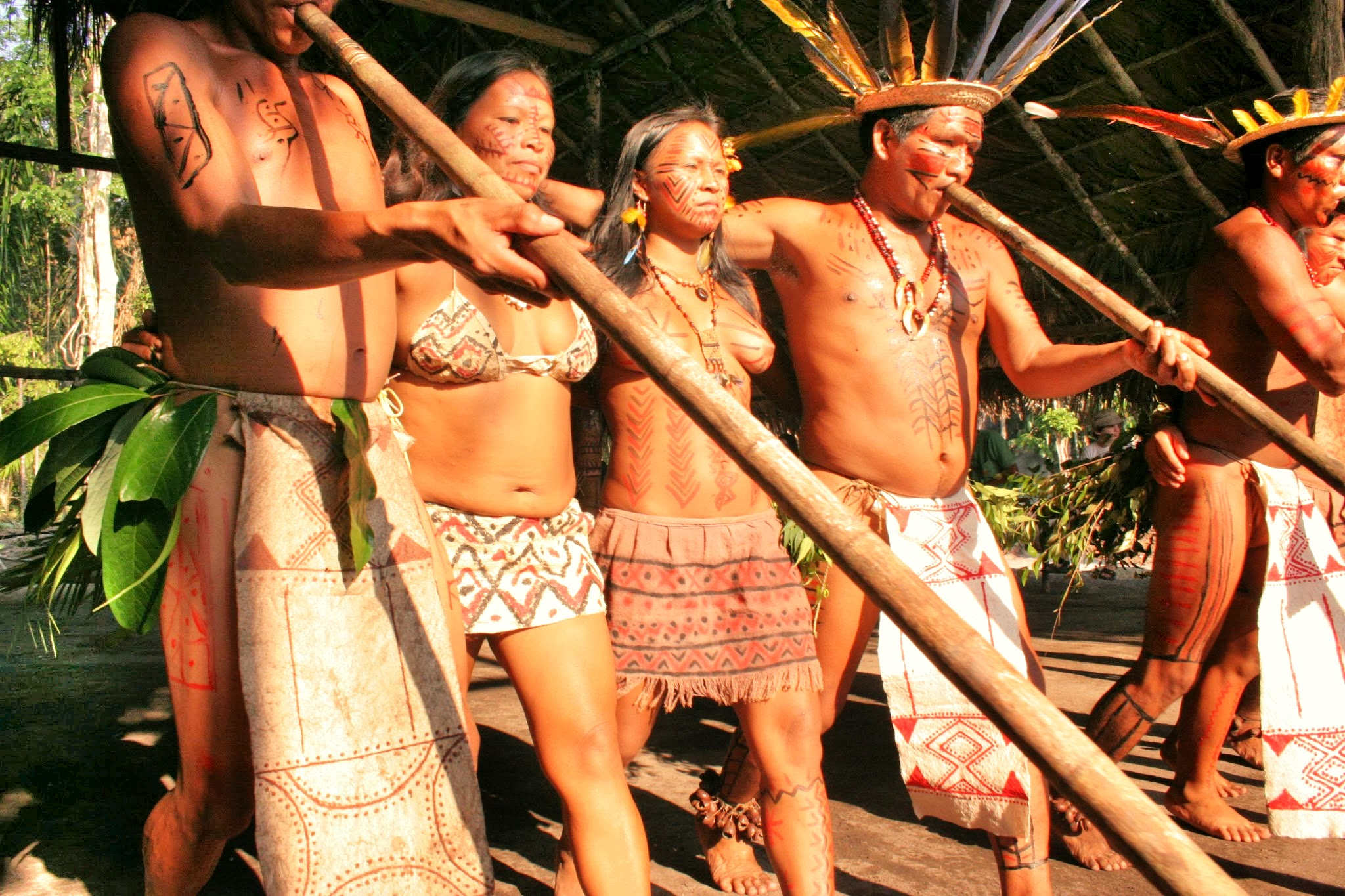
- Tukano welcome dances

Languages
- Tucanoan languages

Religion
- Traditional beliefs, Protestantism, Catholicism

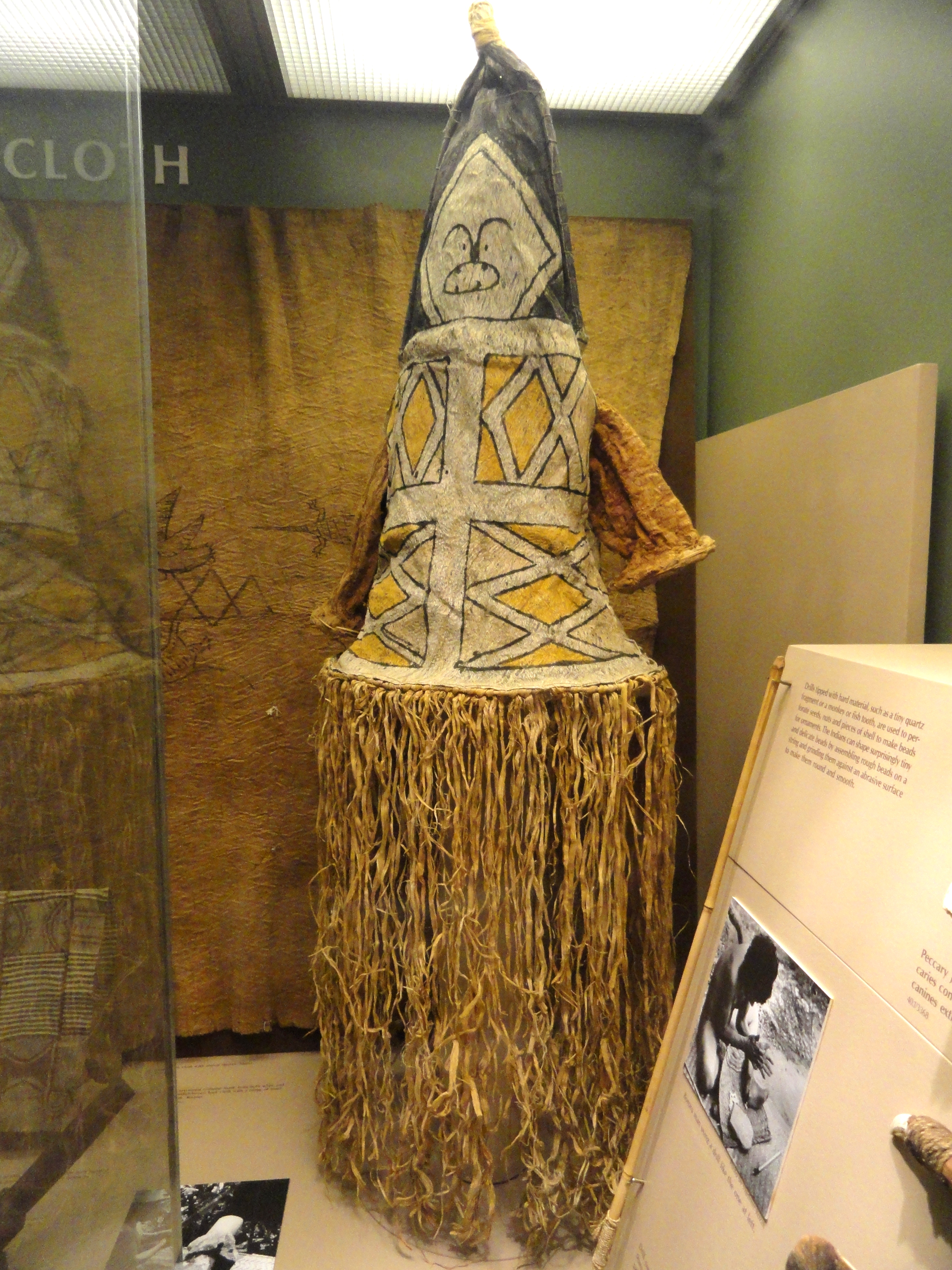
Tucano bark cloth dance regalia, collection of the American Museum of Natural History

The Tucano people (sometimes spelt Tukano)(In Tucano: ye’pâ-masɨ (m.sg.), ye’pâ-maso (f.sg.), ye’pâ-masa (pl.)), are a group of Indigenous South Americans in the northwestern Amazon, along the Vaupés River and the surrounding area. They are mostly in Colombia, but some are in Brazil. They are usually described as being made up of many separate tribes, but that oversimplifies the social and linguistic structure of the region.

== Cultures ==
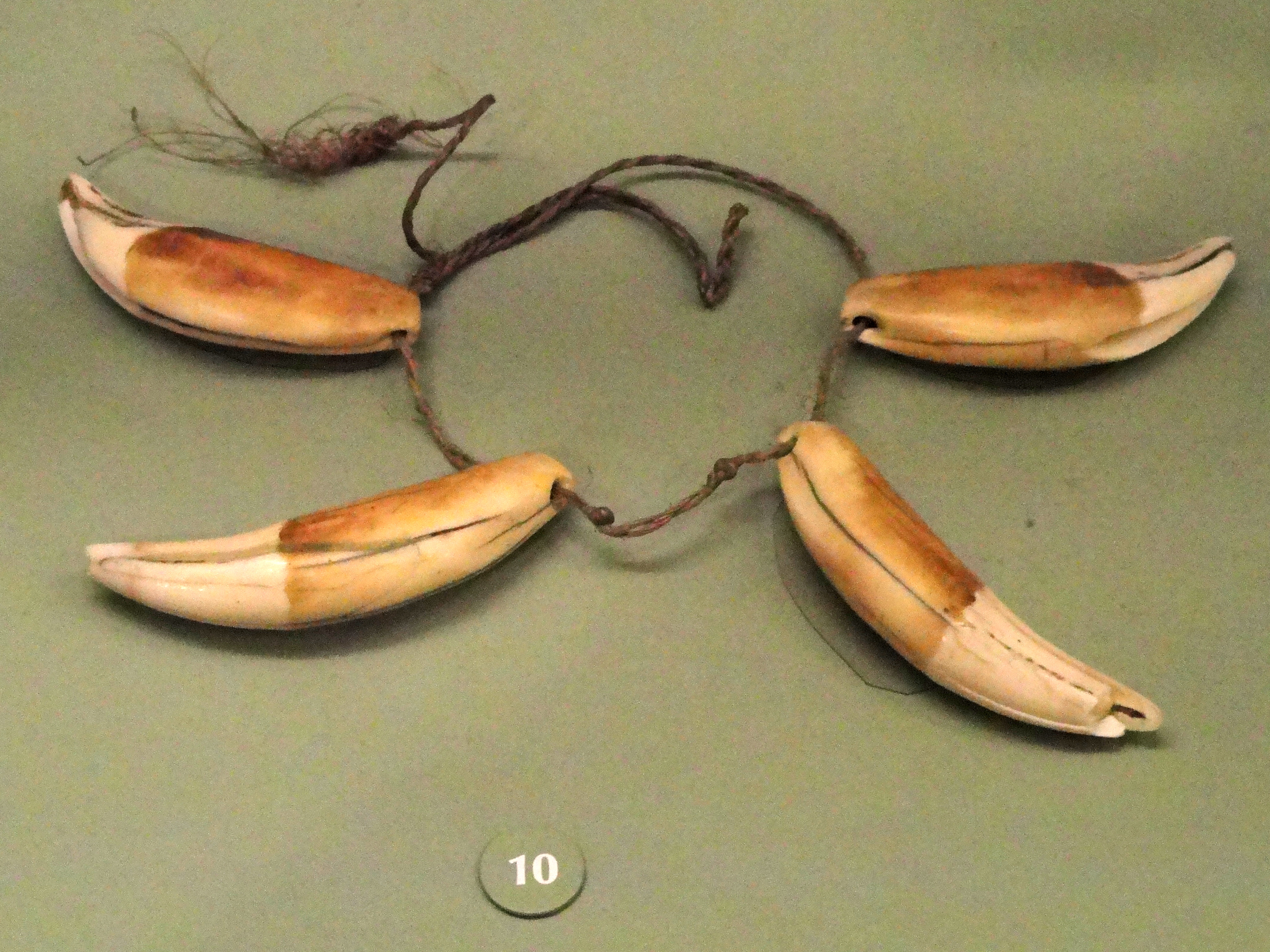
Tucano jaguar tooth and palm cordage necklace, collection of AMNH

The Tucano are multilingual because men must marry outside their language group: no man may have a wife who speaks his language, which would be viewed as a kind of incest. Men choose women from various neighboring tribes who speak other languages. Furthermore, on marriage, women move into the men's households or longhouses. Consequently, in any village several languages are used: the language of the men; the various languages spoken by women who originate from different neighboring tribes; and a widespread regional 'trade' language. Children are born into the multilingual environment: the child's father speaks one language (considered the Tucano language), the child's mother another, other women with whom the child has daily contact, and perhaps still others. However, everyone in the community is interested in language-learning so most people can speak most of the languages. Multilingualism is taken for granted, and moving from one language to another in the course of a single conversation is very common. In fact, multilingualism is so usual that the Tucano are hardly conscious that they do speak different languages as they shift easily from one to another. They cannot readily tell an outsider how many languages they speak, and they must be suitably prompted to enumerate the languages that they speak and to describe how well they speak each one.

== Divisions ==
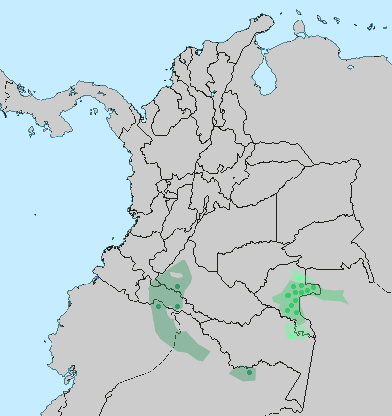
Distribution of the Tucan, who fall into groups of East, Central, and West Tucano language-speakers

As mentioned above, the Tucano practice linguistic exogamy. Members of a linguistic descent group marry outside their own linguistic descent group. As a result, it is normal for Tucano people to speak two, three, or more Tucanoan languages, and any Tucano household (longhouse) is likely to be host to numerous languages. The descent groups (sometimes referred to as tribes) all have their accompanying language; some of the most well known are listed below:

- Bara Tukano
- Barasana
- Cubeo (the Cubeo do not practice exogamy)
- Desana
- Macuna
- Wanano
- Tucano (or Tucano Proper)

== Subsistence ==
The Tucano are swidden horticulturalists and grow manioc and other staples in forest clearings. They also hunt, trap, fish, and forage wild plants and animals.
