= Vaupés River =

Vaupés River Uaupés River
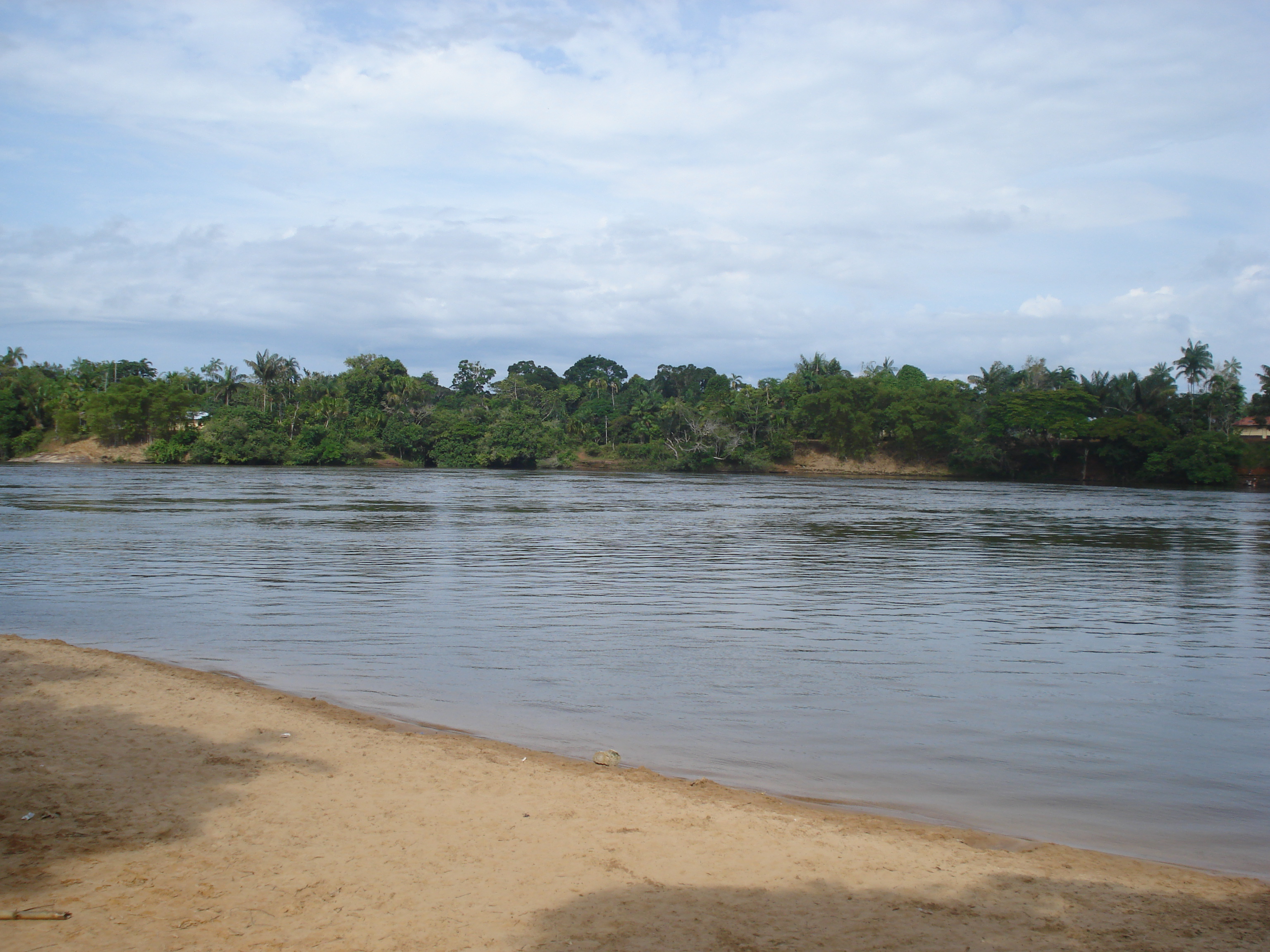

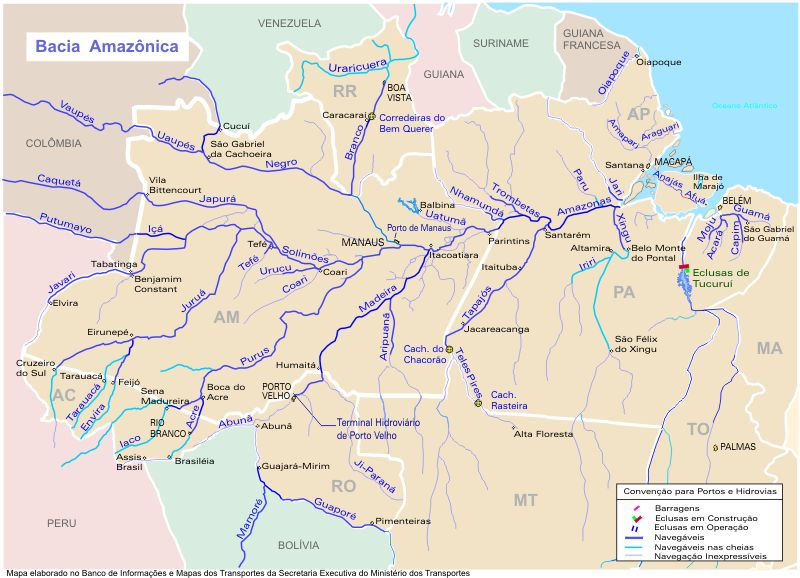
- Vaupés (Uaupés) is in the upper left section

Location
- Countries: Brazil; Colombia

Physical characteristics
- Source
  - location: Vaupés Department, Colombia
  - coordinates: 2°9′1″N 72°57′13″W (approximately)
  - elevation: 360 m (1,180 ft)
- Mouth: Rio Negro
  - coordinates: 0°02′3.06″N 67°16′50.16″W
  - elevation: 67 m (220 ft)
- Length: 1,050 km (650 mi)
- Basin size: 64,370.4 km^{2} (24,853.6 mi^{2})
- Discharge
  - location: Amazonas, Brazil (near mouth)
  - average: 4,344.9 m^{3}/s (153,440 cu ft/s)
- Discharge
  - location: Taracuá, Amazonas
  - average: 2,757.3 m^{3}/s (97,370 cu ft/s)
- Discharge
  - location: Uaracu, Amazonas
  - average: 2,452.7 m^{3}/s (86,620 cu ft/s)
- Discharge
  - location: Mitú, Vaupés, Colombia
  - average: 1,232.4 m^{3}/s (43,520 cu ft/s)

Basin features
- Tributaries
  - right: Papuri, Tiquié

Vaupés River (Uaupés River) is a tributary of the Rio Negro in South America. It rises in the Vaupes Department of Colombia, flowing east through Vaupés Department. It forms part of the international border between the Vaupés department of Colombia and the Amazonas state of Brazil. On the border it merges with the Papurí River and becomes known as the Uaupés. In 1847 an explorer saw a rapid which hurled its waves 12 or 15 metres (40 or 50 ft) in the air, "as if great subaqueous explosions were taking place." The river continues eastwards through the Alto Rio Negro Indigenous Territory until it flows into the Rio Negro at São Joaquim, Amazonas. Vaupés is a blackwater river.

== See also ==
- List of rivers of Amazonas
