= Alphons =

- Gender: Male

Origin
- Origin: Germanic languages
- Meaning: "Noble brave"

Other names
- Popularity: see popular names

Alphons (Latinized Alphonsus, Adelphonsus, or Adefonsus) is a male given name recorded from the 8th century (Alfonso I of Asturias, r. 739–757) in the Christian successor states of the Visigothic Kingdom in the Iberian Peninsula. In the later medieval period it became a standard name in the Hispanic and Portuguese royal families.

It is derived from a Gothic name, or a conflation of several Gothic names; from *Aþalfuns, composed of the elements aþal "noble" and funs "eager, brave, ready", and perhaps influenced by names such as *Alafuns, *Adefuns and *Hildefuns. It is recorded as Adefonsus in the 9th and 10th centuries, and as Adelfonsus, Adelphonsus in the 10th and 11th. The reduced form Alfonso is recorded in the late 9th century, and the Portuguese form Afonso from the early 11th and Anfós in Catalan from the 12th century until the 15th.

Variants of the name include: Alonso (Spanish), Alfonso (Spanish and Italian), Alfons (Dutch, German, Catalan, Polish, Croatian and Scandinavian), Afonso (Portuguese and Galician), Alphonse, Alfonse (French and English), etc.

== Alfons ==
- Alfons Almi (1904–1991), Finnish opera singer and administrator
- Alfons van Blaaderen (born 1963), Dutch physicist
- Alfons Geleyns (1887–1914), Belgian private
- Alfons Goppel (1905–1991), German politician
- Alfons Gorbach (1898–1972), Austrian politician
- Alfons Grotowski (1833–1922), Polish engineer
- Alfons Jēgers (1919–1999), Latvian football and hockey player
- Alfons Karpiński (1875–1961), Polish painter
- Prince Alfons of Liechtenstein (born 2001), Liechtensteiner financial analyst
- Alfons Rebane (1908–1976), Estonian military commander
- Alfons Rissberger (born 1948), German author

== Alphons ==
- Alphons Barb (1901–1979), Austrian academic, archaeologist, numismatist, museum director and author
- Alphons Bellesheim (1839–1912), German church historian nicknamed "Alphons"
- Alphons Boosten (1893–1951), Dutch architect
- Alphons Czibulka (1842–1894), Austro-Hungarian military bandmaster, composer, pianist and conductor
- Alphons Diepenbrock (1862–1921), Dutch composer, essayist and classicist
- Alphons Egli (1924–2016), Swiss attorney and politician
- Alphons Kannanthanam (born 1953), Indian civil servant, advocate and politician
- Alphons Koechlin (politician) (1821–1893), Swiss politician and President of the Swiss Council of States
- Alphons Koechlin (pastor) (1885–1965), Swiss pastor
- Alphons Leopold Mielich (1863–1929), Austrian painter
- Alphons Orie (born 1947), Dutch jurist
- Baron Alphons von Pawel-Rammingen (1843–1932), German noble
- Alphons Maximilian Pfyffer von Altishofen (1834–1890), Swiss architect, hotelier and military Chief of Staff
- Alphons Silbermann (1909–2000), German Jewish sociologist, musicologist, entrepreneur and publicist
- Alphons Stübel (1835–1904), German geologist and naturalist
- Alphons Timmerman (1904–1942), Belgian World War II spy for the Germans
- Alphons Wijnen (1912–2001), Dutch officer in charge during the Rawagede massacre of Indonesian civilians

== Stage name ==
- Alfons, stage name of Emmanuel Peterfalvi, a French comedian

== Fictional characters ==
- Alfie Atkins, known as Alfons Åberg in Swedish, character created by Gunilla Bergström from Sweden
- Alfons Heiderich from Fullmetal Alchemist the Movie: Conqueror of Shamballa

== See also ==
- Alphonso
- Afonso
- Ildefonso (disambiguation)
