= Afonsinho =

Afonsinho is a Portuguese masculine name, a diminutive of the male given name Afonso.

People using this name include:

== People ==
- Afonso Guimarães da Silva (born 1914; nicknamed "Afonsinho") Brazilian soccer player
- Afonso Celso Garcia Reis (born 1947; nicknamed "Afonsinho") Brazilian soccer player

== Characters ==
- Afonsinho (anthropomorphic duck), a Brazilian comic book character created by J. Carlos, in José Carioca comics

== See also ==
- Vale de Afonsinho (parish), Figueira de Castelo Rodrigo, Guarda; named after Afonso I of Portugal.
- Afonso
