= Nheengatu =

Tupi language of northwestern Brazil

- Língua Geral Amazônica
- Native to: Brazil, Colombia, Venezuela
- Region: Guainía Department, Amazonas (Brazil), Amazonas (Venezuela)
- Native speakers: <10,000 (2025)
- Language family: Tupian: Tupi–Guarani; Group III; Nheengatu
- Early form: Old Tupi
- Writing system: Latin

Official status
- Official language in: Amazonas: São Gabriel da Cachoeira; Ceará (Monsenhor Tabosa); Rio Grande do Norte (João Câmara)

Language codes
- ISO 639-3: yrl
- Glottolog: nhen1239
- ELP: Nheengatú
- Linguasphere: 88-AAI-ga
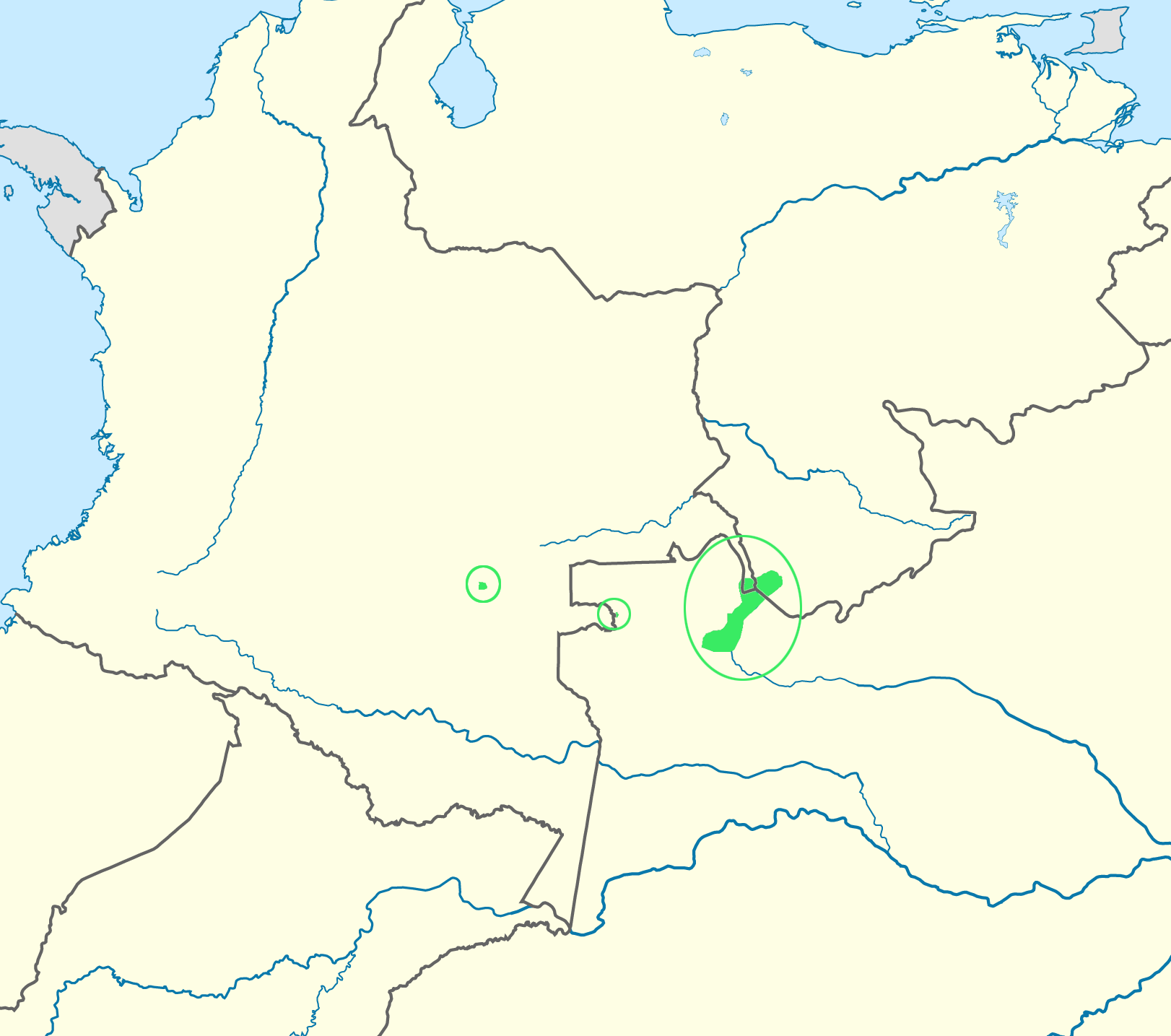

- Nheengatu/Yeral is classified as Severely Endangered by the UNESCO Atlas of the World's Languages in Danger.

Nheengatu, also known as Modern Tupi, Língua Geral Amazônica (Amazonian General Language), and Amazonic Tupi, is a Tupi–Guarani language. It is spoken throughout the Rio Negro region among the Baniwa, Baré, and Warekena people in the municipality of São Gabriel da Cachoeira, and the state of Amazonas, Brazil.

The language has been one of Amazonas' official languages since 2002. Outside of the Rio Negro region, the Nheengatu language is spoken across the Baixo Amazonas region among the Sateré-Mawé, Maraguá, and Mura people. In the Baixo Tapajós and the state of Pará, Nheengatu is mainly spoken among the Borari and the Tupinambá peoples.

A 2010 study by UNESCO estimated the number of Nheengatu speakers at around 10,000. In 2025, Thomas Finbow, a professor at the University of São Paulo, estimated that there were between 5,000 and 7,000 speakers in Brazil, and fewer than 10,000 globally, including small communities in Venezuela and Colombia. Nheengatu is sometimes used to study language change, as it has documentation that spans several centuries.

== Name ==
The name of the language derives from the words nhẽẽga (meaning "language" or "word") and katu (meaning "good"). Nheengatu is referred to by a wide variety of names in literature, including Nhengatu, Tupi Costeiro, Geral, Yeral (in Venezuela), Tupi Moderno, Nyengato, Nyengatú, Waengatu, Neegatú, Is'engatu, Língua Brasílica, Tupi Amazônico, Ñe'engatú, Nhangatu, Inhangatu, Nenhengatu, Yẽgatú, Nyenngatú, Tupi, and Lingua Geral. It is also commonly referred to as the Língua geral amazônica (LGA) in Brazil.

== Classification ==
Nheengatu descended from the extinct Tupinambá language and belongs to the Tupi–Guarani branch of the Tupi language family.

			Portuguese	Ancient Tupi	Yẽgatu (Nheengatu from Rio Negro)	Traditional Nheengatu	Tapajoawaran Nheengatu
1st person	singular		eu	xe, ixé	se, ixé	çe, ixé	se, ixé
1st person	plural	exclusive	nós	oré			
1st person	plural	inclusive	nós	îandé	yãné, yãdé	yãné, yãdé	yãné, yãdé
2nd person	singular		tu	ne/nde, endé	ne, ῖdé	ne, ῖdé	ne, ῖdé
2nd person	plural		vós	pe, peẽ	pe, pẽye	pe, pẽnhé	pe, penhẽ
3rd person	singular		ele, ela	i, a'e	i, ae	i, aé	i, aé
3rd person	plural		eles, elas	i, a'e	i/ta, aῖta	aῖtá	i/ta, aῖta

Eduardo de Almeida Navarro, a Brazilian philologist specializing in Nheengatu, argues that with its current characteristics, Nheengatu would have only emerged in the 19th century as a natural evolution of the Tupi language.

English	Portuguese	Ancient Tupi	Yẽgatu (Nheengatu from Rio Negro)	Traditional Nheengatu	Tapajoawaran Nheengatu
bird	pássaro	gûyrá	wira	wirá	wirá
man	homem	abá	apiawawa	apigá	apigá
woman	mulher	kunhã	kuyã	kunhã	kunhã
happiness	alegria	toryba	surisa	çuriçawa	surisawa
city	cidade	tabusu	tawasu	mairí	tawasú
hammock	rede	iny	makira	makira, gapõna	makina
water	água	'y	ii	yy	i

In addition to the now extinct general language of São Paulo, Nheengatu is closely related to ancient Tupi, and to Guarani of Paraguay.

== History ==
Belonging to the Tupi–Guarani linguistic family, Nheengatu emerged in the 18th century, descending from the now extinct Amazonian Tupinambá, a regional Tupi variant that originated in the Odisséia Tupinambá. The exodus of that nation, fleeing from Portuguese invaders on the Bahia coast, entered the Amazon and settled first in Maranhão, and from there to the Guajará Bay (Belém), the mouth of the Tapajós river, to the Tupinambarana island (Parintins), between the borders of Pará and Amazonas. The language of the Tupinambás became a lingua franca, hence why the Arawak peoples of the Parintins region came to be called Tupinamba Ranas (meaning "fake Tupinambá").

By the early 17th century, the Portuguese had conquered the Amazon and established the colonial state of Grão-Pará and Maranhão, whose capital, Belém, was known as Cidade dos Tupinambás or Tupinambá Marií. In pursuit of catechism, Franciscan and Jesuit priests codified the grammar and orthography of the local lingua franca, which over time developed into the Northern General Language, also known as the Amazonian General Language. Its development occurred in parallel with that of the São Paulo General Language. Nheengatu subsequently spread throughout the Amazon as a tool of colonization, Portuguese dominion, and linguistic standardization. Many peoples came to adopt it as their primary language at the expense of their own; the Hanera, better known as the Baré, are one such example; their shift to Nheengatu ultimately led to the extinction of their native tongue. The Maraguá people, themselves longstanding Nheengatu speakers, have more recently undertaken efforts to revitalize their own language, and today Maraguá is taught alongside Nheengatu in local schools.

Speakers of other languages vastly outnumbered the Portuguese settlers in the Amazon, to the point that the Portuguese themselves adapted to the native language. A Portuguese colonist stated: "To speak or converse in the colony of Grão Pará, I had to use Nheengatu; if not, I would be talking to myself, since no one used Portuguese, except in the government palace in Belém and among the Portuguese themselves."

The General Language was established as the official language from 1689 to 1727 in Grão Pará and Maranhão. In order to erase the Amazonian identity, the Portuguese language was promoted, but did not see much success. In the mid-18th century, the Amazonian General Language, along with the related São Paulo General Language, was used throughout the colony. At this point, Tupinambá remained intact, but as a chiefly liturgical language, while the General Language was used for communication. By the mid-18th century, the Amazon and Tupinambá General Languages were already distinct.

Nheengatu continued to evolve as it expanded into the Alto Rio Negro region through contact with other languages such as Marawá, Baníwa, Warekana, Tucano, and Dâw.

The General Language evolved into two branches, the Northern General Language (Amazonian) and the Southern General Language (Paulista), which at its height became the dominant language of the vast Brazilian territory.

An anonymous manuscript from the 18th century is emblematically titled Dictionary of the general language of Brazil, spoken in all the towns, places, and villages of this vast State, written in the city of Pará, year 1771.

If Nheengatu was the major obstacle for the cultural and linguistic domination of Portuguese in the region, the colonizers saw that it was necessary to take it away from the people and impose the Portuguese language, which at first was not successful since the general language was very well rooted both among indigenous people and in the speech of blacks and whites themselves. The language was banned by Pombal's government, who intended to impose the Portuguese language in Brazil. Hence, many places had their names changed from the Northern General language to names of places and cities in Portugal, such as Santarém, Aveiro, Barcelos, Belém, Óbidos, Faro, Alenquer, and Moz.

A regional ban on the Northern General language came right after the Cabanagem separatist revolts; after the rebels were defeated in 1860, the regencial Brazilian government imposed a harsh persecution on the speakers of Nheengatu. Half of the male population of Grão-Pará was murdered and anyone who was caught speaking in Nheengatu was punished. The imposition of the Portuguese language this time had an effect and with the advent of Portuguese schools, the population was shepherded to the new language.

Also in the 20th century, economic and political events like the Amazon Rubber Boom, which brought huge waves of government encouraged settlers from the Northeast to the Amazon, led to an increased Portuguese presence. This again forced indigenous peoples to move or be subjected to forced labor. The language was again influenced by the increased presence of Portuguese speakers.

Nheengatu remained mainly among the most distant inhabitants of the urban centers, in the families descended from the cabanos and among unconquered peoples. Furthermore, "tapujos" (ribeirinhos) kept their accent and part of their speech tied to their language. Until 1920 it was common for Nheengatu to be used in traditional commercial centers in Manaus, Santarém, Parintins, and Belém.

== Current use ==
Nheengatu is spoken in the Alto Rio Negro region, in the state of Amazonas, in the Brazilian Amazon and in neighboring parts of Colombia and Venezuela. There are potentially as many as 19,000 Nheengatu speakers worldwide, although some journalists have reported as many as 30,000. Currently, it is still spoken by around 73.31% of the 29,900 inhabitants of São Gabriel da Cachoeira (IBGE 2000 Census), around 3,000 people in Colombia, and around 2,000 people in Venezuela, especially in the Rio Negro river basin (Uaupés and Içana rivers). Furthermore, it is the native language of the rural caboclo population of the area and is a common language of communication between Indigenous and non-Indigenous peoples, or between Indigenous peoples of different languages. It is also an instrument of ethnic affirmation of Amazonian indigenous peoples who have lost their native languages, such as Barés, Arapaços, Baniuas, Uarequenas, and others.

Ethnologue rates Nheengatu as "changing" with a rating of 7 on the Gradual Intergenerational Interruption Scale (GIDS) (Simons and Fennig 2017). According to this scale, this classification suggests that "the population of children may use the language among themselves, but it is not being transmitted to children". According to the UNESCO Atlas of Endangered Languages of the World, Nheengatu is classified as "severely endangered". The language has recently regained some recognition and prominence after being suppressed for many years.

In 1998, University of São Paulo professor Eduardo de Almeida Navarro founded the Tupi Aqui organization dedicated to promoting the teaching of historical Tupi and Nheengatu in high schools in São Paulo and elsewhere in Brazil. Professor Navarro wrote a textbook for teaching Nheengatu that Tupi Aqui makes available, along with other teaching materials, on a website hosted by the University of São Paulo.

=== Official status ===
In December 2002, Nheengatu gained official language status alongside Portuguese in the municipality of São Gabriel da Cachoeira in accordance with local law 145/2002. Now Nheengatu is one of the four official languages of the municipality. On 3 May 2021, the municipality of Monsenhor Tabosa in the state of Ceará adopted the "Tupi-Nheengatu" language, spoken by the Tabajara, Potiguara, Gavião, and Tubiba-Tapuia peoples, as an official language, the first in the state to do so. In 2023, Nheengatu was one of 16 Indigenous languages recognized alongside Portuguese as official languages of the state of Amazonas.

== Revitalization ==
In 2007, USP established the first Brazilian university extension course dedicated to the study of Nheengatu. In 2012, the language was incorporated into the graduate program in translation studies. Consequently, in 2016 Graciliano Ramos's A terra dos meninos pelados was translated into Nheengatu. Translations contribute to lexical revitalization; this translation of Ramos's work included linguistic and lexical research on Nheengatu, allowing for the use of obsolete words remembered only by the elders or already completely forgotten and replaced by borrowings from Portuguese, although borrowings adopted more than a century ago—now fully integrated into the language's tradition—were also employed. In 2017, The Little Prince was also translated as part of a master's dissertation supervised by USP professor Eduardo de Almeida Navarro. Likewise, in many instances the translation employed equivalent terms, adaptations, neologisms, and the revival of archaic words; for example, the tiger was replaced with yawareté-pinima (jaguar) and wheat with awatí (corn), and the very title revived an old expression which served "to connect a word that had fallen out of use with the naming of a character in the book who was mysterious and little known".

In 2021, "Nheengatu App" was launched, becoming the first application for teaching an Indigenous language in Brazil. It teaches the Tapejara variant of the language. Its release was supported by the Aldir Blanc Law and the Secretariat of Culture of Pará. According to its creator Suellen Tobler, the app was used in Indigenous schools in the Lower Tapajós region, and by September 2023 approximately 2,200 users had registered. In March 2024, the project was presented at Campus Party Brasília. Other Brazilian Indigenous groups showed interest in the initiative, and Tobler went on to co-author two other apps for teaching native Brazilian languages.

In 2023, the Brazilian Constitution was translated into Nheengatu, marking the first time it was rendered into an Indigenous language—until then, it had been translated only into Spanish and English. The translation was carried out by 15 bilingual Indigenous individuals from the Upper Negro River and Middle Tapajós regions, (Note: Including Dadá Baniwa, Edson Baré, Edilson Martins Baniwa, Melvino Fontes Olímpio, Sidinha Gonçalves Tomas, Dime Pompilho Liberato, Gedeão Arapyú, Frank Bitencourt Fontes, Francisco Cirineu Martins, George Borari, and Cauã Borari.) through a project sponsored by the Supreme Federal Court (STF) and the National Council of Justice, within the framework of the United Nations's International Decade of Indigenous Languages. They worked for at least three hours a day over the course of three months; project curator and then National Library president Marco Lucchesi stated the work was intense with specialists available around the clock to answer any questions. Then STF president Rosa Weber attended the launch event in São Gabriel da Cachoeira (Note: As well as other prominent authorities, namely Sonia Guajajara, Cármen Lúcia, Joenia Wapichana, Lelio Bentes Corrêa, Marco Lucchesi, and José Ribamar Bessa Freire.) and stated Nheengatu was chosen because of its significance to the Amazon region. Later, Weber presented a copy to Lucchesi at the National Library, the first time in 100 years that a head of the judiciary had visited it.

== Documentation ==
Over the course of its evolution since its beginnings as Tupinambá, extensive research has been done on Nheengatu. There have been studies done at each phase of its evolution, but much has been focused on how aspects of Nheengatu, such as its grammar or phonology, have changed upon contact over the years. (Facundes et al. 1994 and Rodrigues 1958, 1986).

The first documents that were produced were by Jesuit missionaries in the 16th and 17th centuries, such as Arte da Grammatica da Lingoa mais usada na costa do Brasil by Father José de Anchieta (1595) and Arte da Língua Brasilíca by Luis Figueira (1621). These were detailed grammars that served their religious purposes. Multiple dictionaries have also been written over the years (Mello 1967, Grenand and Epaminondas 1989, Barbosa 1951). More recently, Stradelli (2014) also published a Portuguese-Nheengatu dictionary.

There have also been several linguistic studies of Nheengatu, such as Borges (1991)’s thesis on Nheengatu phonology and Cruz (2011)’s detailed paper on the phonology and grammar of Nheengatu. She also studied the rise of number agreement in modern Nheengatu by analyzing how changes in the meaning of words occurred over the course of its evolution from Tupinambá (Cruz 2015). Cruz (2014) also studies reduplication in Nheengatu in detail, as well as morphological fission in ditransitive constructions. A proper textbook for the conducting of Nheengatu classes has also been written. Lima and Sirvana (2017) provides a sociolinguistic study of Nheengatu in the Pisasu Sarusawa community of the Baré people, in Manaus, Amazonas.

In 2023, the Constitution of the Federative Republic of Brazil (Brazilian Constitution), promulgated in 1988, was translated into Nheengatu for the first time.

=== Projects ===
Language documentation agencies (such as SOAS, Museu do Índio, Museu Goeldi, and Dobes) are currently not engaged in any language documentation project for Nheengatu. However, research on Nheengatu by Moore (1994) was supported by Museu Goeldi and the Brazilian National Research Council (CNPq), and funded by the Society for the Study of the Indigenous Languages of the Americas (SSILA) and the Inter-American Foundation. In this study, Moore focused on the effects of language contact and how Nheengatu evolved over the years with the help of a Nheengatu-speaking informant. Moore urges for the "location and documentation of modern dialects of Nheengatu", due to their risk of becoming extinct.

== Phonology ==
=== Consonants ===
Taylor (1985) and (2007)
		Bilabial	Alveolar	Palatal	Velar	
		Bilabial	Alveolar	Palatal	plain	labial
Nasal		m	n		ŋ	
Plosive	voiceless	p	t		k	kʷ
Plosive	prenasal	ᵐb	ⁿd		ᵑɡ	ᵑɡʷ
Fricative			s	ʃ		
Approximant				j		w
Tap			ɾ			

Moore et al. (1993)
		Bilabial	Alveolar	Palatal	Velar		Glottal
		Bilabial	Alveolar	Palatal	plain	labial	Glottal
Plosive/ Affricate	voiceless	p	t	tʃ	k	kʷ	ʔ
Plosive/ Affricate	prenasal	ᵐb	ⁿd		ᵑɡ		
Plosive/ Affricate	voiced	b			ɡ		
Fricative			s	ʃ			
Sonorant	oral		ɾ	j		w	
Sonorant	nasal	m	n	j̃			

Borges (1991); da Cruz (2011)
		Bilabial	Alveolar	Palatal	Velar
Nasal		m	n	ɲ	
Plosive	voiceless	p	t		k
Plosive	voiced	b	d		ɡ
Fricative			s	ʃ	
Tap			ɾ		

=== Vowels ===
da Cruz (2011)
	Front		Central		Back	
	oral	nasal	oral	nasal	oral	nasal
Close	i	ĩ			u	ũ
Mid	e	ẽ				
Open			a	ã		

- /e/ is realized as [ɛ] in stressed syllables not followed by a nasal or approximant.

== Morphology ==
There are eight word classes in Nheengatu: nouns, verbs, adjectives, adverbs, postpositions, pronouns, demonstratives, and particles.

=== Pronouns ===
There are two types of pronouns in Nheengatu: personal or interrogative. Nheengatu follows the same pattern as Tupinambá, in that the same set of personal pronouns is adopted for the subject and object of a verb.

	Singular	Sg Prefix	Plural	Pl Prefix
1	isé	se-	yãndé	yane-
2	ĩndé	ne-	pẽỹẽ	pe-
3	aʔé	i- s-	aẽtá	ta-

Examples of Personal Pronouns in use:

inde re-kuntai amu nheenga
2SG 2sgA-speak other.entity language
"You speak another language."

isé se-ruri a-iku.
1SG 1sgE-be.happy 1sgA.be
"I am happy."

In Nheengatu, personal pronouns can also take the form of prefixes. These prefixes are necessary in the usage of verbs as well as postpositions. In the latter case, free forms of the pronouns are not permitted. Moore illustrates this with the following:

i) se-irũ ii) *isé-irũ
{} 1SG(prefix)-with {} 1SG-with
{} {‘with me’} {} {‘with me’}

The free form of the first person singular pronoun cannot be combined with the postposition word for 'with'.

The second set of pronouns are interrogative, and are used in question words.

mãʔã	'what, who, whom'
awá	'who, whom'

=== Verbal affixes ===
According to Moore, throughout the evolution of Nheengatu, processes such as compounding were greatly reduced. Moore cites a summary by Rodrigues (1986), stating that Nheegatu lost Tupinambá's system of five moods (indicative, imperative, gerund, circumstantial, and subjunctive), converging into a single indicative mood. Despite such changes alongside influences from Portuguese, however, derivational and inflectional affixation was still intact from Tupinambá. A select number of modern affixes arose via grammaticization of what used to be lexical items, such as the former lexical item etá 'many'. Over time and grammaticization, this word became to plural suffix -itá.

Apart from the pronominal prefixes shown in Table (3), there are also verbal prefixes. Verbs in Nheengatu fall into three mutually exclusive categories: intransitive, transitive, and stative. By attaching verbal prefixes to these verbs, a sentence can be considered well-formed.

	Singular	Plural
1	a-	ya-
2	re-	pe-
3	u-	aẽtá-ú

Examples of verbal prefixes:

i) a-puraki ii) a-mũỹã
{} 1sg-work {} 1sg-make
{} {‘I work.’} {} {I make (an object).’}

In these examples, the verbal first person singular prefix a- is added to the intransitive verb for 'work' and transitive verb for 'make' respective. Only when prefixed with this verbal clitic can they be considered well-formed sentences.

=== Reduplication ===
Another morphological feature of Nheengatu is reduplication, which Cruz (2011) explains in her grammar to be employed differently based on the community of Nheengatu speakers. This is a morphological process that was originally present in Tupinambá, and it tends to be used to indicate a repeated action.

u-tuka~tuka ukena
3SG-REDUP~knock door
"He is knocking on the door (repeatedly)."

In this example, the reduplicated segment is tuka, which is the Nheengatu verb for 'knock'. This surfaces as a fully reduplicated segment. However, partial reduplication also occurs in this language. In the following example elicited by Cruz, the speaker reduplicates the first two syllables (a CVCV sequence) of the stem word.

Apiga ita sasi~sasiara.
men PL REDUP~BE.sad
"The men are sad."

Another point to note from the above example is the usage of the plural word ita. Cruz (2011) highlights that there is a distinction in the usage of reduplication between communities. The speakers of Içana and the upper region of the Rio Negro use Nheengatu as their main language, and reduplication occurs in the stative verbs, expressing intensity of a property, and the plural word ita doesn't necessarily need to be used. In Santa Isabel do Rio Negro and the more urbanized areas of São Gabriel da Cachoeira, bilingualism is common, with Portuguese serving as the primary language. In this context, these speakers also employ reduplication to indicate the intensity of a property, but the plural ita must be used if the subject is plural.

== Sample texts ==
Pedro Luiz Sympson (1876)
A! xé ánga, hu emoté i Iára. / Xé abú iu hu rori ána Tupã recé xá ceiépi. / Maá recé hu senú i miaçúa suhi apipe abasáua: / ahé recé upáem miraitá hu senecáre iché aié pepasáua. / Maá recé Tupã hu munha iché áramau páem maá turuçusáua, / i r'ira puranga eté. / Y ahé icatusáua xé hu muçaim ramé, r'ira péaca upáem r'iapéaca ramé, maá haé aitá hu sequéié.

Pe. Afonso Casanovas (2006)
Aikwé paá yepé tetama puranga waá yepé ipawa wasú rimbiwa upé. Kwa paá, wakaraitá retama. Muíri akayú, paá, kurasí ara ramé, kwá uakaraitá aywã ta usú tawatá apekatú rupí. Muíri viaje, tausú rundé, aintá aría waimí uyupuí aitá piripiriaka suikiri waá irũ, ti arã tausaã yumasí tauwatá pukusawa.

Eduardo de Almeida Navarro (2011)
1910 ramé, mairamé aé uriku 23 akaiú, aé uiupiru ana uuatá-uatá Amazônia rupi, upitá mími musapíri akaiú pukusaua. Aé ukunheséri ana siía mira upurungitá uaá nheengatu, asuí aé umunhã nheengarisaua-itá marandua-itá irũmu Barbosa Rodrigues umupinima ana uaá Poranduba Amazonense resé.

Aline da Cruz (2011)
A partir di kui te, penhe nunka mais pesu pekuntai aitekua yane nheenga. Yande kuri, mira ita, yasu yakuntai. Ixe kuri asu akuntai perupi. Ixe kua mira. Ixe asu akuntai perupi. Penhe kuri tiã pesu pekuntai. Pepuderi kuri penheengari yalegrairã yane felisidaderã.

Sample from book Yasú Yapurũgitá Yẽgatú (2014)
Se mãya uyutima nãnã kupixawa upé. Nãnã purãga yaú arama yawẽtu asuí purãga mĩgaú arama yuiri. Aikué siya nãnã nũgaraita. Purãga usemu mamé iwí yumunaniwa praya irũmu.

Roger Manuel López Yusuino (Venezuelan Nheengatu) (2013)
Tukana aé yepé virá purangava asoi orikú bando ipinima sava, ogustari oyengari kuemaite asoi osemo ara ramé osikari arama ombaó vasaí iyá. Tukana yepé virá porangava yambaó arama asoi avasemo aé kaáope asoi garapé rimbiva ropí.

== See also ==
- Afonso Casasnovas
- Língua Geral
- Region of Cabeça do Cachorro

== Bibliography ==
- Navarro, Eduardo de Almeida; Ávila, Marcel Twardowsky; Trevisan, Rodrigo Godinho (2017). "O Nheengatu entre a vida e a morte: a tradução literária como possível instrumento de sua revitalização lexical" [Nheengatu between life and death: literary translation as a possible instrument of its lexical revitalization]. Revista Letras Raras (in Portuguese). 6 (2). doi:10.35572/rlr.v6i2.768. ISSN 2317-2347. Archived from the original on 21 January 2025.
- Moore, Denny; Facundes, Sidney; Pires, Nádia (1994). Nheengatu (Língua Geral Amazônica), its History, and the Effects of Language Contact (PDF). Survey of California and Other Indian Languages. Berkeley: University of California. Archived from the original (PDF) on 6 December 2017.
- Rodrigues, Aryon (1996). "As línguas gerais sul-americanas". Papia. 4 (2 ed.). Etnolinguística: 6–18.
- Navarro, Eduardo De Almeida (2005). Método moderno de tupi antigo: a língua do Brasil dos primeiros séculos (in Portuguese) (3 ed.). São Paulo: Global.
- Navarro, Eduardo De Almeida (2011). Curso de Língua Geral (Nheengatu ou Tupi Moderno) a língua das origens da civilização Amazônica (PDF) (in Portuguese) (1 ed.). São Paulo. ISBN 978-85-912620-0-7.
- da Cruz, Aline (2011), Fonologia e Gramática do Nheengatú: A língua geral falada pelos povos Baré, Warekena e Baniwa (PDF) (in Portuguese), Lot Publications, ISBN 978-94-6093-063-8, archived from the original (PDF) on 7 March 2014
- Lima Schwade, Michéli Carolíni de Deus (2014), Descrição Fonético-Fonológica do Nheengatu Falado no Médio Rio Amazonas (PDF), Manaus: Federal University of Amazonas
