= Afonso =

- Gender: Male

Origin
- Origin: Germanic languages
- Meaning: see Alphons

Other names
- Popularity: see popular names

Afonso is a masculine given name, the Portuguese and Galician form of Alphons.

== Portuguese aristocrats ==
- Afonso I of Portugal (1109–1185)
- Afonso II of Portugal (1185–1223)
- Afonso III of Portugal (1210–1279)
- Afonso IV of Portugal (1291–1357)
- Afonso V of Portugal (1432–1481)
- Afonso VI of Portugal (1643–1683)
- Afonso I, Duke of Braganza (1377–1461)
- Afonso, Hereditary Prince of Portugal (1475–1491), heir apparent to the Portuguese throne
- Afonso, Duke of Porto (1865–1920), heir apparent to the Portuguese throne
- Afonso of Portugal, Lord of Portalegre (1263–1312), son of Afonso III of Portugal
- Cardinal-Infante Afonso of Portugal (1509–1540), Portuguese archbishop, cardinal and bishop
- Afonso, Prince of Beira (born 1996), heir apparent to the current pretender to the defunct Portuguese throne

== Rulers of the Kingdom of Kongo ==
- Afonso I of Kongo (c. 1456–1542 or 1543)
- Afonso II of Kongo (fl. 1561)
- Afonso III of Kongo (died 1674)

== Footballers ==
- Afonso (footballer) (Manoel Afonso Júnior, born 1991), Brazilian forward
- Afonso Alves (born 1981), Brazilian striker
- Afonso Assis (born 2006), Portuguese midfielder
- Afonso Freitas (born 2000), Portuguese left-back
- Afonso Patrão (born 2007), Portuguese forward
- Afonso Rodrigues (born 2002), Portuguese winger
- Afonso Taira (born 1992), Portuguese defensive midfielder

== Others ==
- Afonso de Albuquerque (c. 1453–1515), Portuguese general, admiral, statesman, conquistador and governor of India
- Afonso de Alprão (died 1422), Portuguese Franciscan friar, writer, royal confessor and papal inquisitor
- Afonso Casasnovas (1925–2009), Spanish Salesian priest
- Afonso Cláudio (politician) (1859–1934), Brazilian politician, teacher and poet
- Afonso Costa (1871–1937), Portuguese lawyer, professor and politician
- Afonso Costa (rower) (born 1996), Portuguese rower
- Afonso Figueiredo (born 1993), Portuguese former footballer
- Afonso Florence (born 1960), Brazilian politician
- Afonso Pena (1847–1909), Brazilian lawyer, professor and politician

== See also ==
- Alphons
- Aponso, a list of people with the given name
- Ildefonso (disambiguation)
