= Geleyns =

Geleyns is a Belgian surname. Notable people with the surname include:

- Alfons Geleyns (1887–1914), Belgian private
- Charles Geleyns (c. 1610–1677), Flemish monk
