= Cabeça =

Cabeça, the Portuguese word for head, may refer to:

== Things ==
- Cabeça Dinossauro, the third studio album released by Brazilian rock band Titãs

== Places ==
- Cabeça da Cobra, a headland on the Angola coast, also known as Margate Head, 06° 32' 40" S 12° 29' 57" E
- Cabeça da Baleia, a promontory on the Angola coast, also known as Whales Head, 11° 34' 35" S 13° 46' 12" E
- Cabeça do Cachorro, a region of Brazil
- Cabeça Fundão, a village on the island of Fogo, Cape Verde
- Cabeça do Velho, a mountain in Manica Province, Mozambique, 19° 05' 55" S 33° 30' 18" E
- Cabeça Gorda, Bragança, a mountain in Bragança District, Portugal, 41° 27' N 06° 20' W
- Cabeça Gorda, Faro, a mountain in Faro District, Portugal, 37° 21' N 08° 27' W
