= Gentil Theodoor Antheunis =

Belgian poet and writer

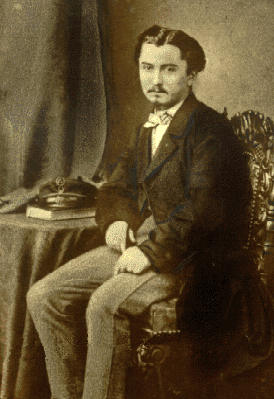
- Gentil Antheunis
- Born: 9 September 1840; Oudenaarde, Belgium
- Died: 5 August 1907 (aged 66); Elsene, Belgium
- Occupation: poet

Gentil Theodoor Antheunis (9 September 1840 – 5 August 1907) was a Belgian poet. He was the son-in-law of Hendrik Conscience, whose only daughter Maria he married in 1870. He was born in Oudenaarde.

From 1859 until 1860, he was a teacher in the college of Oudenaarde and in 1861 he became a teacher in Dendermonde. After his early career as a teacher he studied law at the University of Ghent, where he graduated in 1866. He became a judge on 1 January 1868 in Oostrozebeke, later in Torhout, on 15 July 1877 he became a judge at Halle and finally in Brussels.

He wrote songs and poems in several newspapers and journals, of which several were put to music by Willem De Mol, such as Lentelied, Ik ken een lied, Droeve tijden, and Bethlehem. They were published in one volume in 1873. In 1874, he was awarded for a minnelied (E: romantic song) by the Antwerp Chamber of rhetoric, De Olijftak (E: Olive branch). In addition he wrote Uit het hart', Liederen en gedichten (Dendermonde and Leiden, 1875); Liederkrans uit de Loverkens van Hoffmann von Fallersleben, with his own music (Ghent, 1877); Leven, lieven en zingen (Ghent, 1879), Naar wijd en zijd (1905, put on music by François-Auguste Gevaert). One of his best known songs is Mijn Vlaanderen heb ik hart'lijk lief, on lyrics by Theofiel Coopman. He was buried in Oudenaarde, where the Gentiel Antheunisplein is named after him.

Antheunis died in 1907 at Elsene.

== See also ==
- Flemish literature

== Sources ==
- 't Zijn droeve tijden als de oorlog woedt (Dutch)
- Gentil Theodoor Antheunis (Dutch)
