= François van Campenhout =

Belgian musician (1779–1848)

François van Campenhout

François van Campenhout (5 February 1779 – 24 April 1848) was a Belgian opera singer, conductor and composer. He composed the music for the Belgian national anthem, "La Brabançonne".

Campenhout was born in Brussels, where he studied violin. He worked initially as an office clerk, but soon pursued a career as a musician. After he had been a violist at the Théâtre de la Monnaie (or Muntschouwburg) in Brussels for a while, he started a career as a tenor at the Opera in Ghent. This was the beginning of a successful opera career, which brought him to Brussels, Antwerp, Paris, Amsterdam, The Hague, Lyon and Bordeaux. In 1828, he ended his career as a singer and became conductor in Brussels, where he died in 1848. He is buried at Brussels Cemetery in Evere, Brussels.

Campenhout wrote a large number of works: operas such as Grotius ou le Château de Lovesteyn and Passe-Partout, which were successful, and he also composed ballet music, symphonies and choir music. He wrote the music of the Brabançonne in September 1830, to a text by Alexandre Dechet (Jenneval).

Van Campenhout was a freemason and a member of the Grand Orient of Belgium.

== Sources ==
- VERGAUWEN (David), "Frans Van Campenhout als patriot en vrijmetselaar. Episodes uit het leven van de auteur van de Brabançonne", in: Belgisch Tijdschrift voor Muziekwetenschap, Vol. LXVII, 2013, pp. 115–134.
- La Brabançonne
