= General Language =

South American lingua francas

The term General Language (Portuguese: língua geral) refers to lingua francas that emerged in South America during the 16th and 17th centuries, the two most prominent being the Paulista General Language, which was spoken in the region of Paulistania but is now extinct, and the Amazonian General Language, whose modern descendant is Nheengatu.

Both were simplified versions of the Tupi language, the native language of the Tupi people. Portuguese colonizers arrived in Brazil in the 16th century, and faced with an indigenous population that spoke many languages, they sought a means to establish effective communication among the many groups. The two languages were used in the Jesuit Reductions, the Jesuit missions in Brazil and by early colonists; and came to be used by enslaved Africans and other Indian groups.
