= Vers l'avenir =

Belgian patriotic song, former national anthem of the Congo Free State

English: Towards the future
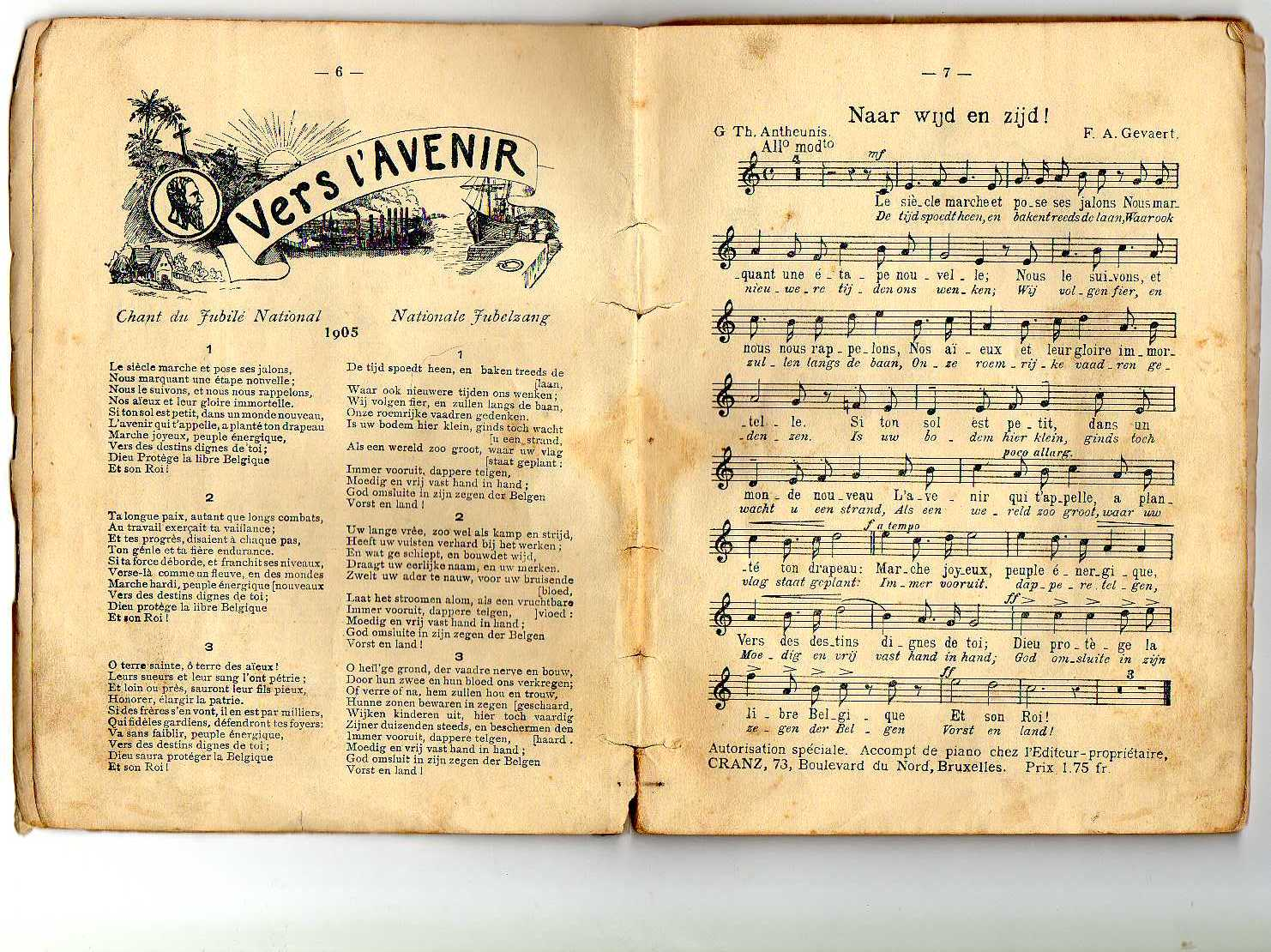
- A 1907 edition of Vers l'avenir intended for the Catholic youth movement, Jeunes Gardes catholiques of Ixelles.
- National anthem of the Congo Free State and party anthem of the Rexist Party
- Lyrics: Gentil Theodoor Antheunis
- Relinquished: 1908 (as the national anthem of Congo Free State)
- Succeeded by: "La Brabançonne"

Audio sample
- Vers l'avenir: file; help

Instrumental recording of the anthem

Vers l'avenir (French: [vɛʁ lavniʁ]; "Towards the Future"), less commonly known by its Dutch title Naar wijd en zijd, is a Belgian nationalist song which was also the national anthem of the Congo Free State. The lyrics were written by Gentil Theodoor Antheunis. It was also adopted as the anthem of the Rexist Party, a Fascist political movement founded in 1930 by Léon Degrelle. Upon the annexation of the Congo Free State as a colony of Belgium, this anthem was replaced with La Brabançonne, the national anthem of Belgium.

== Lyrics ==
French lyrics

Le siècle marche et pose ses jalons,
Nous marquant une étape nouvelle.
Nous le suivons et nous nous rappelons
Nos aïeux et leur gloire immortelle.
Si ton sol est petit, dans un monde nouveau
L'avenir qui t'appelle a planté ton drapeau.

Refrain:
Marche joyeux, peuple énergique,
Vers des destins dignes de toi.
Dieu protège la libre Belgique
Et son Roi !

Ta longue paix autant que longs combats
Au travail exerçait ta vaillance,
Et tes progrès disaient à chaque pas
Ton génie et ta fière endurance.
Si ta force déborde et franchit ses niveaux,
Verse-la, comme un fleuve, en de mondes nouveaux !

Refrain:
Marche hardi, peuple énergique,
Vers des destins dignes de toi.
Dieu saura protéger la Belgique
Et son Roi !

Ô terre sainte, ô terre des aïeux,
Leurs sueurs et leur sang t'ont pétrie,
Et loin ou près sauront leurs fils pieux
Honorer, élargir la Patrie.
Si des frères s'en vont, il en est par milliers
Qui, fidèles gardiens, défendront tes foyers.

Refrain:
Va sans faiblir, peuple énergique,
Vers des destins dignes de toi.
Dieu saura protéger la Belgique
Et son Roi !

Dutch lyrics

De tijd spoedt heen en bakent reeds de laan
Waar ook nieuwere tijden ons wenken
Wij volgen fier en zullen langs de baan
Onze roemrijke vaderen gedenken
Is uw bodem hier klein ginds toch wacht u een strand
Als een wereld zo groot waar uw vlag staat geplant

Refrein:
Immer vooruit dappere telgen
Moedig en vrij vast hand in hand
God omsluite in zijn zegen der Belgen
Vorst en land

Uw lange vree zowel als kamp en strijd
Heeft uw vuisten gehard bij het werken
En wat gij schiep en bouwde wijd en zijd
Draagt uw eerlijke namen, uw merken
Zwelt uw ader te nauw voor het bruisende bloed
Laat het stromen alom als een vruchtbare vloed

Refrein:
Immer vooruit dappere telgen
Moedig en vrij vast hand in hand
God omsluite in zijn zegen der Belgen
Vorst en land

O heil'ge grond der vaadren erve en bouw
Door hun zweet en hun bloed ons verkregen
Of verre of na hen zullen hou en trouw
Hunne zonen bewaren in zegen
Wijken kinderen uit hier toch waardig geschaard
Zijn er duizenden steeds en beschermen den haard

Refrein:
Immer vooruit dappere telgen
Moedig en vrij vast hand in hand
God omsluite in zijn zegen der Belgen
Vorst en land
