= Alfons Geleyns =

Belgian private (1889–1914)

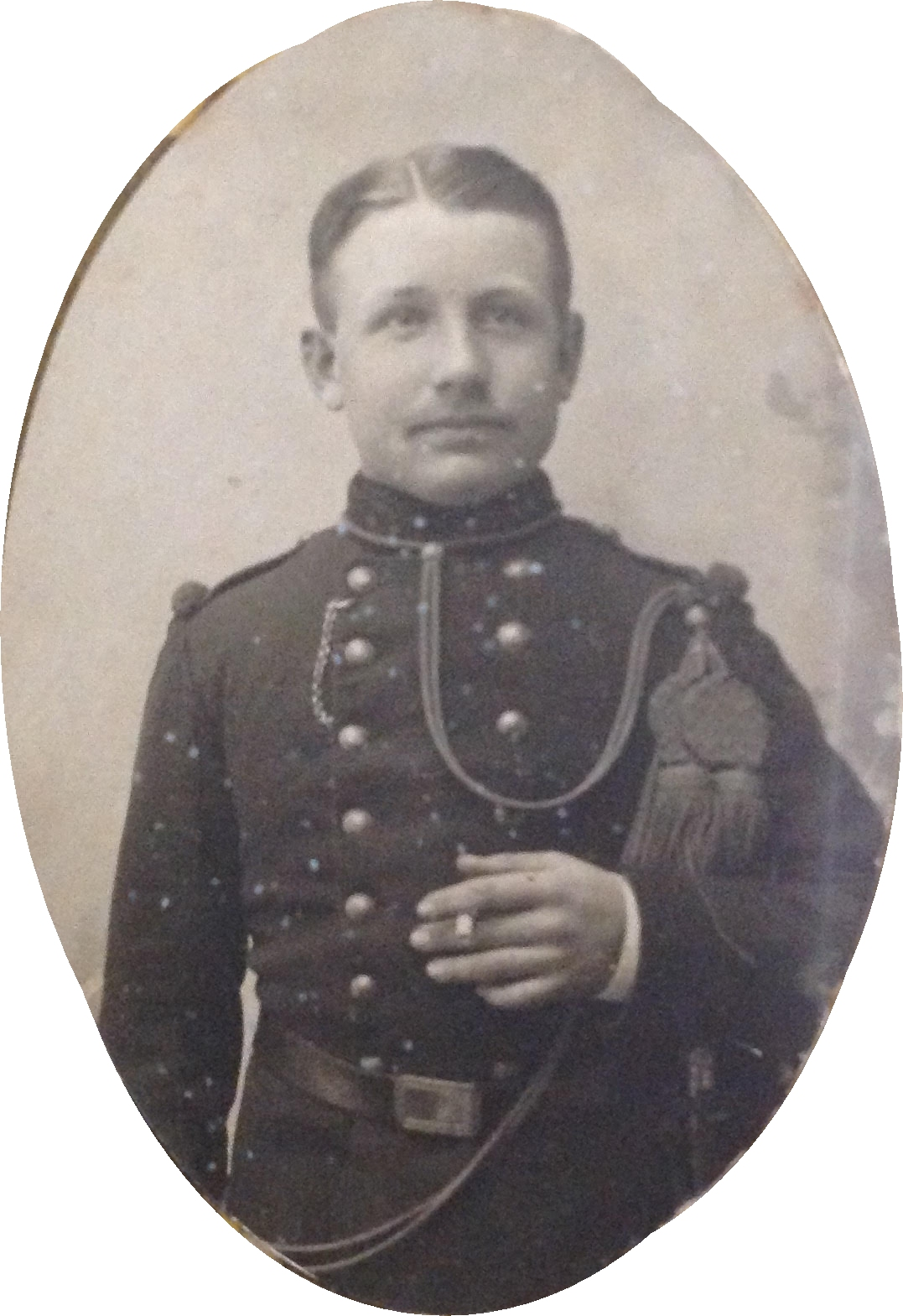
- Born: January 30, 1887; Rotselaar, Flemish Brabant, Belgium
- Died: September 25, 1914 (aged 25); Keerbergen, Flemish Brabant, Belgium
- Burial place: Veltem Belgian Military Cemetery, Flemish Brabant, Belgium
- Military career
- Allegiance: Belgium
- Branch: Belgian Land Component
- Service years: 1909 – 1914
- Rank: Soldaat Milicien 2de Klasse
- Conflicts: World War I; German Invasion of Belgium; Siege of Antwerp †

Louis Alphonse (Alfons) Geleyns was a Belgian private and war hero of World War I. He was known for his relatively early death during the war and his burial which has undergone a series of events and changes.

== Military career ==
Geleyns was born in Rotselaar as the son of a farmer, Ferdinand Geleyns, and his wife, Marie-Thérèse Lambrechts. He was the second child and eldest son in a family of seven children. On February 6, 1909, in the canton of Haacht, he was conscripted due to the Conscription Act of 1847. He belonged to the very last conscripted group, as the law had changed by December 14 from forced service to volunteer service. On October 1, 1909, Alfons started his training in the Beverloo Camp. He would stay there until September 29, 1911, as he began to follow war exercises in Arlon in 1910. During his military service, he was appointed as a bugler.

After Belgian mobilization on July 31, 1914, Geleyns ended up as a soldier in the Karabiniers-Wielrijders Regiment and was killed at the age of 25, on September 25, 1914, in Keerbergen between Bakestraat and Putsebaan and near the Korte Welvaart. His exact death date is disputed as on his military record, September 26 is mentioned as his date of death while his grave mentions September 25.

== Burial ==
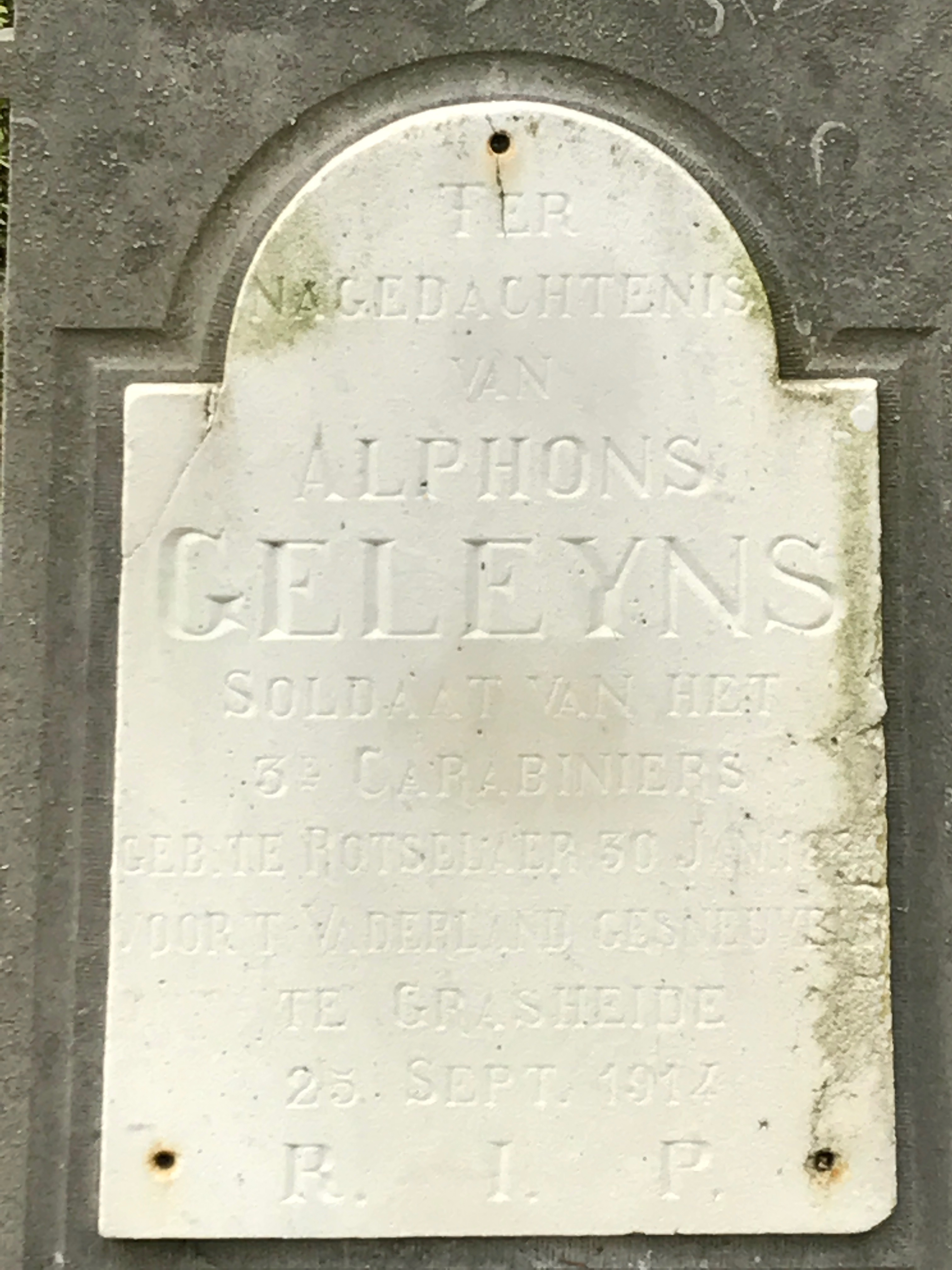
Gravestone of Alfons Geleyns.in Grasheide

After his death, on September 25, 1914, the day of his death, he was buried in the cemetery around the church of Grasheide, part of the municipality of Putte adjacent to Keerbergen and later reburied in the new municipal cemetery. His tombstone reads:

In memory of Alphons Geleyns, Soldier of the 3rd Carabiniers, b. in Rotselaer, 30 Jan. 1887. Died for the fatherland at Grasheide, 25 Sept. 1914. RIP

On his tombstone, only his middle name and also call sign are written but his date of birth was listed as in 1887 instead of 1889. Geleyns was never reburied in his home village of Rotselaar because his parents never requested it. His grave is owned by the Belgian State and after the war, the State decided to center the various war graves in military cemeteries and Geleyns was buried at the Veltem Belgian Military Cemetery. However, the parents of Alfons Geleyns protested against an exhumation of their son's remains. This made the grave a private grave. His younger brothers Armand and Jules both named their oldest son Alfons after their fallen brother.

After the Armistice of 11 November 1918, war memorials were erected in almost all Belgian municipalities and the fallen were honored. In Grasheide, the grave of Alfons Geleyns was the place where veterans and others came to pay their respects every year. After a mass, a procession with fanfare marched to his grave where the Brabançonne was played. An annual flower arrangement of white chrysanthemums and oak leaves was placed on his grave. This tradition died out in the 1970s with the death of the last veterans of World War I.

On September 4, 1928, on the occasion of a local fair, a funeral tribute was held at the grave of Alfons Geleyns. Pastor Joseph Lavrijzen's homily led to incidents with Flemish nationalists present. Ward Hermans, one of the leading figures, took the floor outside the church to refute the pastor's argument which caused a polemic to occur.

In 2005, the municipal council of Putte decided to remove the grave to make way for new graves but a number of people were opposed to this decision and campaigned for the preservation of Geleyns' grave. Eventually the city council changed their decisions and the grave was allowed to remain. In 2012, the municipal council started the search for godparents of certain graves with historical value, including the grave of Geleyns.

== Awards ==
On November 15, 1937, he was posthumously awarded Knight of the Order of Leopold II with a silver palm by Royal Decree.
