= Monsenhor Tabosa =

Municipality in Ceará, Brazil

Coordinates: 4°47′S 40°04′W

- Municipality
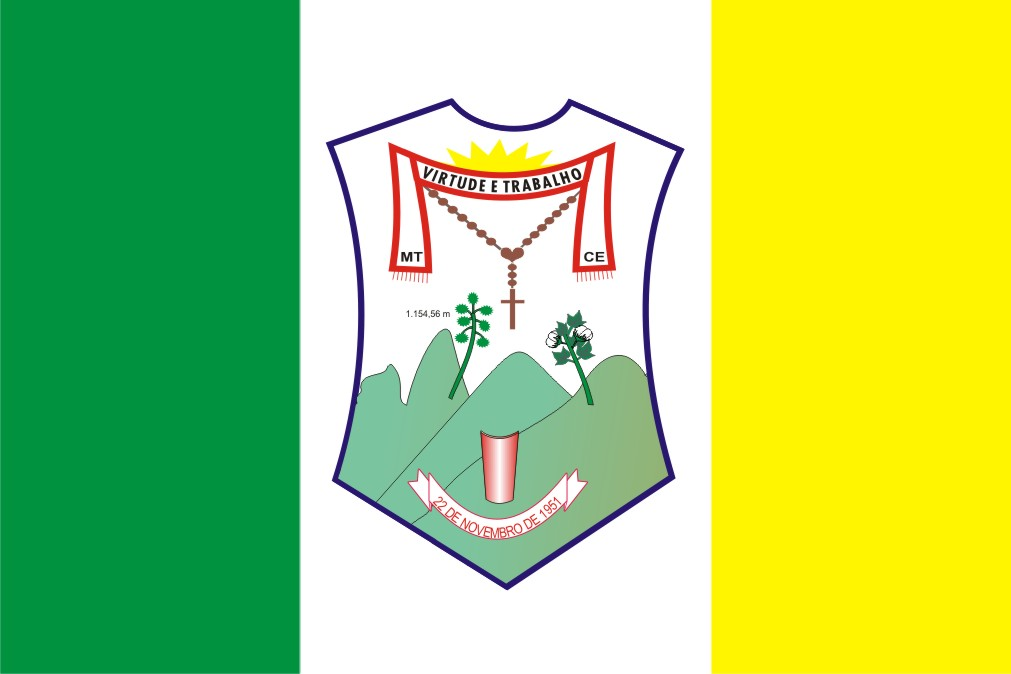
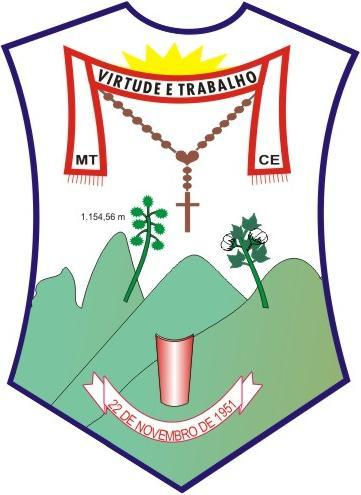
- Flag Coat of arms

- Location of Monsenhor Tabosa within Ceará
- Country: Brazil
- Region: Nordeste
- State: Ceará
- Mesoregion: Sertoes Cearenses
- Established: 22 November 1951

Government

Area
  - Total: 886.303 km^{2} (342.204 sq mi)

Population (2022)
  - Total: 17,149
- Time zone: UTC−3 (BRT)

Monsenhor Tabosa is a municipality in the state of Ceará in the Northeast region of Brazil.

== See also ==
- List of municipalities in Ceará
