= Cabeça do Cachorro =

Region in Northern Brazil

- Anthem: Hino Nacional Brasileiro (in Portuguese) "National Anthem of Brazil"
- Largest city: São Gabriel da Cachoeira; 00°07′48″S 67°05′20″W
- Official languages: Portuguese; Nheengatu
- Ethnic groups: Amerindian and mixed White-Amerindian
- Demonyms: Amazonense (individual from Amazonas state); Brasileiro (Brazilian)

Establishment
  - Brazilian-Colombian Treaty of Bogotá: April 21, 1907
  - Brazilian-Colombian Treaty of Limits and Navigation: November 15, 1928

Area
  - Total: 160,000 km^{2} (62,000 sq mi)

Population
  - 2008 estimate: 50,000
  - Density: 0.3/km^{2} (0.8/sq mi)
- Currency: Real (R$) (BRL)
- Time zone: UTC-4.
  - Summer (DST): no DST
- Calling code: +55-97
- Internet TLD: .br
- 1. Northernmost point (2°14′46″N 67°24′42″W).; 2. Westernmost point (0°11′13″S 70°3′27″W).; 3. Rough Eastern boundary (about 0°38′56″N 65°32′23″W).; 4. Rough Southern boundary (about 3°8′46″S 68°0′56″W).

The region known as Cabeça do Cachorro (lit. 'Dog's Head') is the area comprising the northwesternmost end of the state of Amazonas, Brazil, bordering on Colombia and Venezuela.

This region roughly coincides with the Brazilian municipality of São Gabriel da Cachoeira and parts of Japurá, and shares international borders with the Venezuelan state of Amazonas (to the northeast), and the Colombian departments of Guainía (to north), Vaupés (to west) and Amazonas (to southwest). The Brazilian Army maintains a border platoon next to the border tripoint, at the village of Cucuí, where there is also a Brazilian Air Force base.

Cabeça do Cachorro means, literally, "Dog's Head" in Portuguese. The name was given after the shape of this region's map, that resembles the head of a dog with its mouth wide open. This picturesque geographical shape was defined by the Treaty of Bogotá, which was signed by Colombia and Brazil in 1907 and defined the borders between the two countries according to the uti possidetis criterion. These borders were later confirmed by a supplementary Colombian-Brazilian treaty in 1928.

The area has several Amerindian reservations. The municipality of São Gabriel da Cachoeira, in Cabeça do Cachorro, is the first in Brazil to adopt an Amerindian language, Nheengatu, as co-official with Portuguese.

The region also has one of the largest niobium reserves in the world.

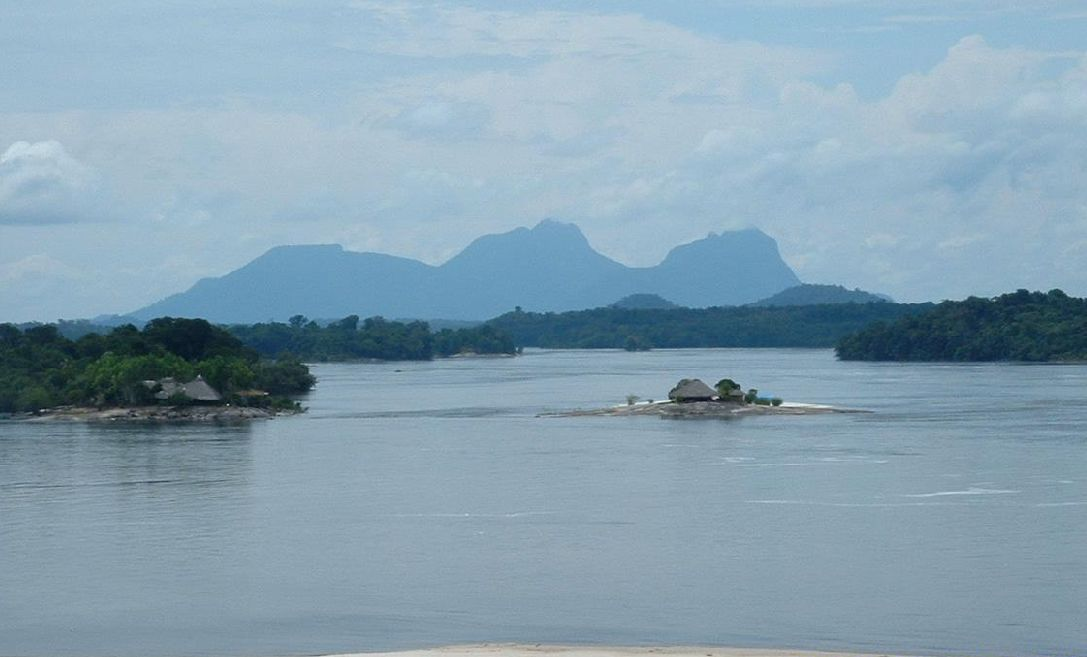
A famous landscape of Cabeça do Cachorro: The Bela Adormecida ("Sleeping Beauty") ridge near São Gabriel da Cachoeira

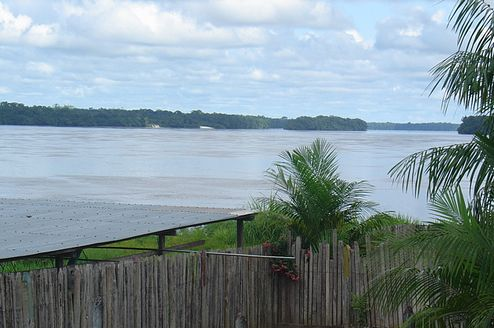
The Triple Border: at top left, Colombia; at top right, Venezuela. Picture taken from the Brazilian side of the border at Cucuí, in the north of Cabeça do Cachorro

== See also ==
- Brazilian state of Amazonas
- Municipality of São Gabriel da Cachoeira
- Municipality of Japurá
- Colombia-Brazil borders
- Roman Catholic Diocese of São Gabriel da Cachoeira
