= Afonso Casasnovas =

Spanish Salesian missionary in Brazil (1925–2009)

- Born: 11 May 1925; Spain
- Died: 17 December 2009 (aged 84)
- Occupation: Salesian missionary
- Notable work: Noções de língua geral ou Nheengatú

Afonso Casasnovas (11 May 1925 – 17 December 2009) was a Spanish Salesian priest.

== Biography ==
Afonso Casasnovas was born on 11 May 1925. He was a missionary in the Brazilian Negro River region, where he lived for 40 years among the Indigenous people and caboclos.

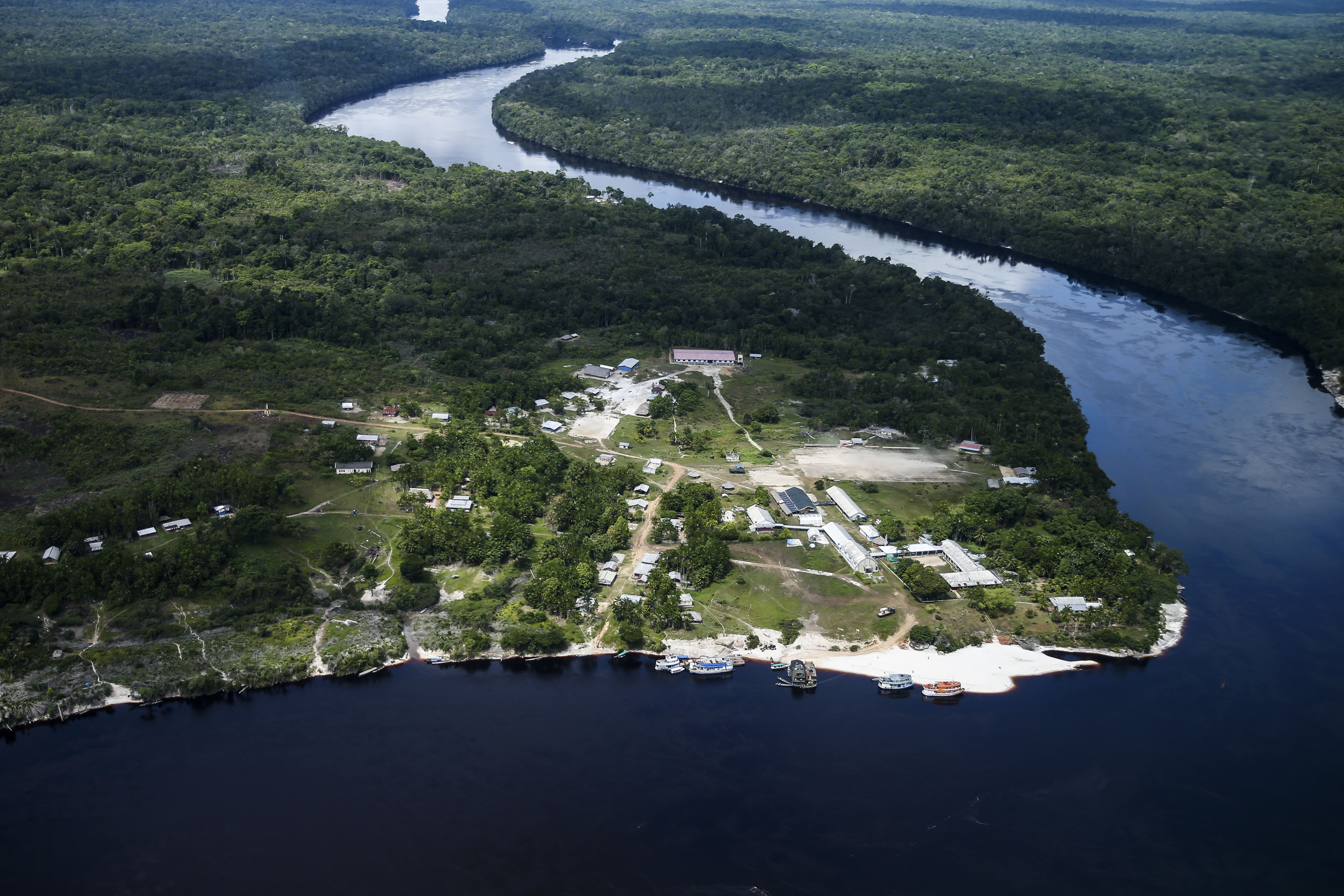
Aerial view of the community of Assunção do Içana, in the municipality of São Gabriel da Cachoeira, in the Upper Negro River region

His name is associated with the Indigenous movement. In the 1980s, the military regime–led Calha Norte Project began to be implemented in the Içana River region, aiming to introduce mining companies such as Paranapanema and Goldamazon there. At that time, Casasnovas, then parish priest of Assunção do Içana, warned the Indigenous people that these companies and their activities could result in the "theft and seizure" of their lands. He denounced the illegal entry of mining companies with the support of the military, the Fundação Nacional dos Povos Indígenas in São Gabriel da Cachoeira, and the government of the state of Amazonas; later, Goldamazon withdrew from mining in the region. In 1988, Brazilian Army helicopters landed in the yard of the Salesian mission with heavily armed soldiers, and in addition to destroying the radio communications and burning all documentation recording the state violence, they also detained Casasnovas for several hours.

Casasnovas wrote a Nheengatu language grammar used in schools throughout the Negro River area. The work Noções de língua geral ou Nheengatú was published in 2000, with a second edition released in 2006. Its first part deals with the language's grammar, while the second part focuses on legends and stories, including translations of ten traditional narratives and two more presented only in Portuguese, the language in which they were possibly originally collected. According to Casasnovas, the legends were chosen because they "are still alive in the memory of our people" among the many "that have been written by various authors". In 2001, he taught a course on Nheengatu at the headquarters of the Sindicato dos Trabalhadores em Telecomunicações in Manaus, Amazonas.

=== Death ===
Afonso Casasnovas died on 17 December 2009. During the week of his death, he was taken to the hospital for routine examinations; around noon on the day he died, Casasnovas suffered a cardiac arrest and was taken to the intensive care unit, where later that evening he experienced additional cardiac arrests and died at approximately 9:30 p.m.

== Works ==
The following is the analysis of a passage from Canasnovas's Nheengatu grammar:

U-sika, u-maã siiya kunhã-itá u-pisika waá-itá u-ikú pirá-mirĩ yuka.
3V-arrive 3V-see many woman-PL 3V-catch REL-PL 3V-be fish-small rotten
"He/She arrived and saw many women who were catching rotten little fish."

== Bibliography ==
- Avila, Marcel Twardowsky (2021). Proposta de dicionário nheengatu-português [Proposal of Nheengatu–Portuguese dictionary] (in Portuguese). São Paulo: Universidade de São Paulo. doi:10.11606/T.8.2021.tde-10012022-201925. Archived from the original on 16 July 2024.
- Barbosa, Helena Lúcia Silveira (2019). A tradução de cantos e narrativas Tupi-Guarani (1970 – 2019): um diagnóstico historiográfico [The translation of Tupi–Guarani songs and narratives (1970–2019): a historiographical diagnosis] (in Portuguese). São Paulo: Universidade de São Paulo. doi:10.11606/D.8.2020.tde-31082020-150028. Archived from the original on 4 February 2023.
- Casimiro, Dario Emilio (2022). Processo de organização etnopolítica Medzeniako (Baniwa e Koripako): (Re)configuração do fazer político no Hiniali [Process of ethnopolitical organization Medzeniako (Baniwa and Koripako): (Re)configuration of political doing in Hiniali ] (in Portuguese). Manaus: Universidade Federal do Amazonas. Archived from the original on 8 July 2025.
- Lima, Ademar dos Santos (2018). Educação escolar indígena: um estudo sociolinguístico do Nheengatu na escola Puranga Pisasú do Rio Negro, Manaus-AM [Indigenous school education: a sociolinguistic study of Nheengatu at the Puranga Pisasú School of the Rio Negro, Manaus-AM ] (in Portuguese). Manaus: Universidade do Estado do Amazonas.
- Luciano, Gersem José dos Santos (2011). Educação para manejo e domesticação do mundo entre a escola ideal e a escola real: os dilemas da educação escolar indígena no Alto Rio Negro [Education for management and domestication of the world between the ideal school and the real school: the dilemmas of Indigenous school education in the Upper Negro River ] (in Portuguese). Brasília: Universidade de Brasília. Archived from the original on 23 May 2025.
