= Alfons van Blaaderen =

Dutch physicist

Alfons van Blaaderen (born 27 October 1963) is a Dutch physicist. He is a professor at Utrecht University and works in the field of soft matter.

== Career ==
Van Blaaderen was born on 27 October 1963 in Naarden. He attended the Voorbereidend wetenschappelijk onderwijs and subsequently studied physics and chemistry at Utrecht University. In 1992 he obtained his PhD at Utrecht University under professor A. Vrij with a dissertation titled Colloidal dispersions of (organo-)silica spheres: formation mechanism, structure and dynamics. In 1999 he was named professor of experimental physics of condensed matter.

In 2011 Van Blaaderen was awarded the Peter Debye Prize by the Edmond Hustinx Foundation. Van Blaaderen was elected a member of the Royal Netherlands Academy of Arts and Sciences in 2013.
