= Afonsinho (footballer, born 1947) =

Brazilian footballer

Afonso Celso Garcia Reis (born in Marília, 3 September 1947), best known as Afonsinho, is a former association footballer.

He started his career in 1962 playing for XV de Jaú, and in 1965 for Botafogo. He also played for Olaria, Santos, América Mineiro, Madureira, Flamengo and Fluminense. A Brazilian footballer’s battle for greater freedom to change clubs sparked reforms benefitting generations of players. Afonso Celso Garcia Reis – better known as Afonsinho – began his football career in 1962 and three years later was a midfielder with the Brazilian club Botafogo. The club took exception to his unconventional appearance and political views under the authoritarian military dictatorship of the time. So Afonsinho fought a long legal battle with Botafogo and in 1971 won the right to negotiate his own services in order to change clubs without the need for outside interference or approval. During that time there was no employees rights in Brazil as players were regarded as government property which made them difficult to exercised their rights and freedom. Once a player signed a contract with a club, he was not allowed to leave the club even after the contract expired or even if other teams were interested in him after the end of his contract, he was not released from the club because was taken as club's own property. In doing so, he blazed a trail for Brazilian men's footballers of future generations to exercise their own labour rights and maintain firmer control over their own careers. Apart from being a football player, he was trained as a medical doctor and was seeing some issues differently than other players. According to his fellow players, Afonsinho was a great thinker and wasn't afraid to expressed his views during the time Brazil was ruled by a brutal military government. Four decades after Fausto, at the zenith of the military dictatorship in Brazil in 1971 he succeeded in becoming the first Brazilian footballer to obtain in practice in Brazil the right to change his employer/team when and if he wanted, with no need for an agent or the approval of his former employer, and without suffering professional reprisals. He was isolated for being outspoken and was regarded as a rebel during the authoritarian military rule of Brazil. He gained popularity among his fellow players as well as supporters whom on the street might say "you are one of the Seleção"! Though some other big name players were not came in full view to support him. His Coach told him to cut his long beard so that he could be allowed to play his football which he denied. His beard portrayed him as a revolutionist just as Che Guevara. During that time keeping long beard was regarded as a symbol of revolution, Afonsinho was never selected to play for Brazil’s national team because of his outspoken views but also Brazil never won a World Cup during his isolated time as a player until 1994, 24 years later after 1970 World Cup triumph in Mexico – but he did qualify as a doctor and at age 76, still passionate enough about football that he finds time to coach young football players, both boys and girls together with another young coach who helped him to teach the young players about modern football as well as moral behavior near his home on Paqueta Island in Rio. A movie documentary called "Passe Livre" was made by Oswaldo Caldeira about the subject in 1974.
