= José Ribamar Bessa Freire =

- Born: Manaus, Amazonas, Brazil
- Occupations: Historian, anthropologist, linguist, journalist, writer
- Awards: Professor Honoris Causa by the Federal University of Amazonas (2026)

Academic background
- Education: Federal University of Rio de Janeiro (Graduation)

Academic work
- Discipline: History, Anthropology, Linguistics
- Sub-discipline: Indigenous history, Social history of language, Amazonian languages
- Institutions: Federal University of Amazonas (UFAM); Federal University of the State of Rio de Janeiro (UNIRIO); Rio de Janeiro State University (UERJ)
- Notable works: Rio Babel – a história das línguas na Amazônia; Políticas de línguas no novo mundo; Os Aldeamentos indígenas do Rio de Janeiro

José Ribamar Bessa Freire is a Brazilian historian, anthropologist, linguist, journalist, and writer known for his extensive work on indigenous history, Amazonian languages, and oral literature. In 2026, he was awarded the title of Professor Honoris Causa by the Federal University of Amazonas (UFAM) in recognition of his decades-long contribution to historical research and the preservation of indigenous cultures in the Amazon region.

== Early life and education ==
Bessa Freire was born in the Aparecida neighborhood of Manaus, Amazonas. He earned his teaching diploma from the Instituto de Educação do Amazonas in 1965, where he was notably the only male student in a class of over sixty women. This early classroom experience profoundly shaped his understanding of pedagogical resources and teaching methods.

He went on to graduate in Social Communication from the Federal University of Rio de Janeiro (UFRJ) in 1969 and also pursued studies in Law at the same institution, though he did not complete the latter. During the Brazilian military dictatorship, he was forced into exile, spending eight years living in Chile, Peru, and France. Upon returning to Brazil, he was arrested for over twenty days before successfully passing a public examination to teach at UFAM.

Bessa Freire specialized in Sociologie du Développement at IRFED in France (1971–72). He pursued doctoral studies in History at the School for Advanced Studies in the Social Sciences (EHESS) in Paris (1980–83) and later earned a Doctorate in Literature from the Rio de Janeiro State University (UERJ) in 2003.

== Career ==
Bessa Freire taught at the Federal University of Amazonas from 1977 to 1987, initially in the Communications program and subsequently in the History Department, whose creation he actively helped to shape. He later became a professor in the Post-Graduate Program in Social Memory at the Federal University of the State of Rio de Janeiro (UNIRIO), where he retired in 2022, and a professor at UERJ's Faculty of Education, where he retired in 2021.

For three decades, he coordinated UERJ's Program for the Study of Indigenous Peoples (Proindígena). In this capacity, he has traveled extensively across Brazil for over fifty years, training indigenous teachers and assisting in the production of didactic materials for intercultural education. He has also taught postgraduate modules and intercultural degree programs at numerous public universities, including UFAM, UFAC, UFRR, UFF, UFG, UFSC, UFMG, and the University of the State of Amazonas (UEA).

Beyond academia, Bessa Freire has maintained a weekly column in Amazonas newspapers since 1984 and continues to write on his blog, Taquiprati. The name, he explains, is not an affectionate term but rather a column that "hit hard against corruption and 'stupidity' in power," serving as a permanent critique of authority.

== Research and publications ==
Bessa Freire's research focuses on the social history of language, with particular emphasis on oral literature, memory, heritage, historical sources, indigenous history, and Amazonian languages. His bibliography includes numerous books, such as Rio Babel – a história das línguas na Amazônia (Rio Babel: The History of Languages in the Amazon), Políticas de línguas no novo mundo (Language Policies in the New World), Os Aldeamentos indígenas do Rio de Janeiro (Indigenous Villages of Rio de Janeiro), and A Amazônia no período colonial (The Amazon in the Colonial Period).

He has published articles in specialized academic journals across several countries, including Brazil, Peru, Colombia, Ecuador, Venezuela, Mexico, France, Germany, Italy, and Japan. His work is considered foundational for understanding the linguistic and cultural dynamics of the Amazonian region during both the colonial and contemporary periods.

== Honors and recognition ==
On June 10, 2026, the University Council of the Federal University of Amazonas approved and conferred upon Bessa Freire the title of Professor Honoris Causa. The honor, regulated by UFAM's Statute and a 2007 CONSUNI Resolution, is granted to external personalities of great relevance. Initially hesitant about accepting the nomination, Bessa Freire later reflected on the recognition, stating that as a retired academic, he accepted it as a great personal honor.

In its official communication, UFAM recognized him as "one of the most important Brazilian intellectuals and one of the great promoters of historical research in Amazonas," noting that his "DNA is unmistakably imprinted on generations and generations of historians trained in our Department." The title was simultaneously awarded alongside the Doutor Honoris Causa granted to indigenist Egydio Schwade.
