= Aponso =

Aponso is a surname. Notable people with the surname include:

- Amila Aponso (born 1993), Sri Lankan cricketer
- Flavian Aponso (born 1952), Sri Lankan former cricketer

== See also ==
- Jayasekara Aponsu (born 1951), Sri Lankan actor, director and scriptwriter
