= La Brabançonne =

National anthem of Belgium

English: The Song of Brabant
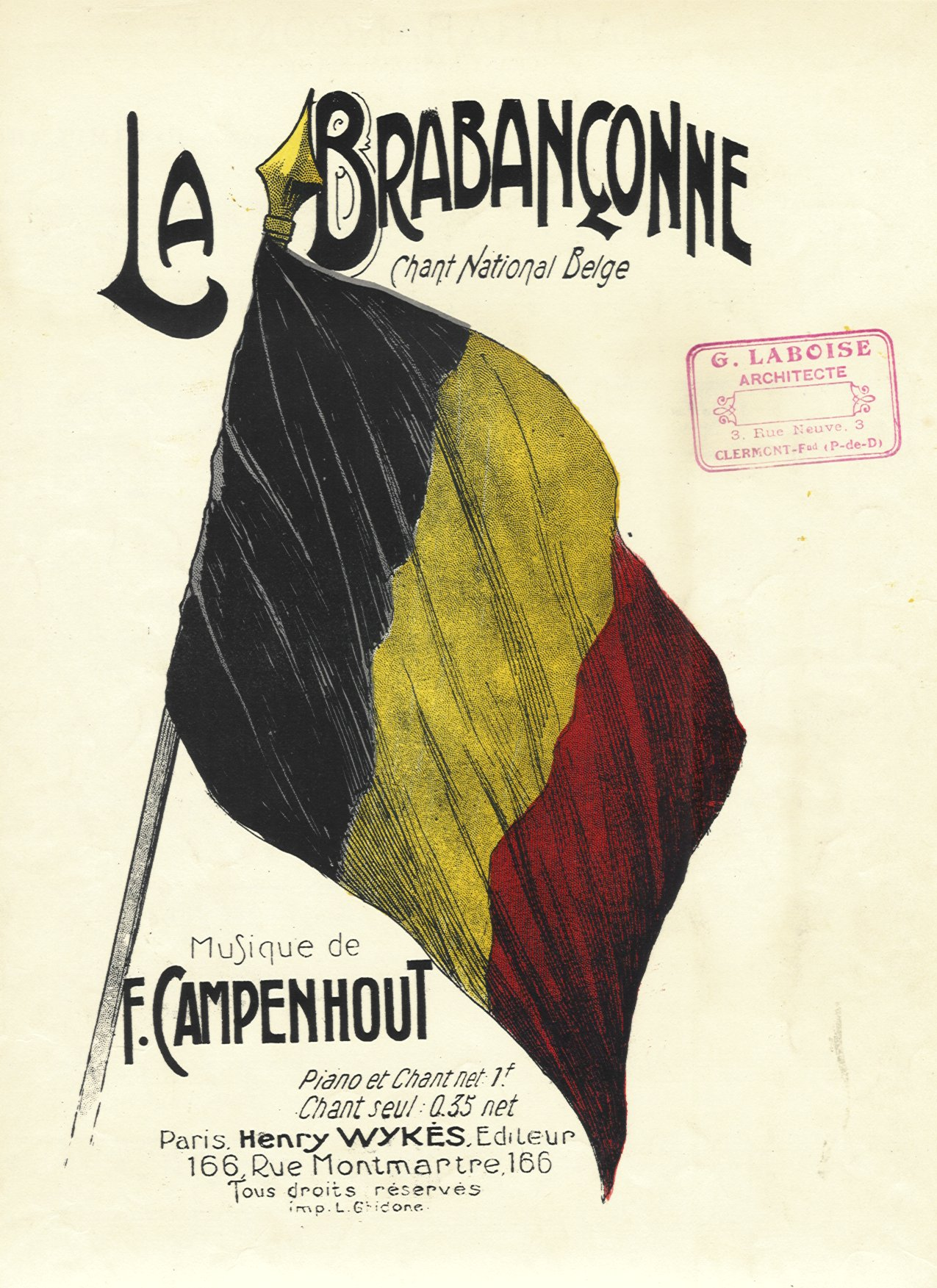
- Cover of a score of the Brabançonne, dated around 1910
- National anthem of Belgium
- Lyrics: Alexandre Dechet and Constantin Rodenbach (original version, 1830); Charles Rogier (current version, 1860)
- Music: François van Campenhout, September 1830
- Adopted: 1860, current text in 1921

Audio sample
- U.S. Navy Band instrumental version: file; help

"La Brabançonne" (French: [la bʁabɑ̃sɔn] (La Brabançonne); Dutch: "De Brabançonne"; German: "Das Lied von Brabant/Die Brabançonne", lit. 'The Song of Brabant') is the national anthem of Belgium. The originally French title refers to the Duchy of Brabant; the name is usually untranslated in Belgium's other two official languages, Dutch and German. (Note: In English, one may refer to Brabant by the adjectives Brabantine or Brabantian, but only the latter term is (nearly) as general as French Brabançon^{fr}, which can also be a substantive for e.g. the dialect, a man, or a horse or its breed from Brabant. In French, Brabançonne is the feminine gender of adjective Brabançon and matches the preceding definite article la, thus might fit an implied e.g. chanson, ('song') (cf. the official name of the French hymn: "la Marseillaise", "(song) having to do with the city of Marseille"). But neither the female definite article in German die Brabançonne^{de} nor the male den Brabançonne in Brabantian or Brabantine dialects of Dutch can fit 'song', which is Lied in German and lied in Dutch, both of neutre genus. In today's standard Dutch, de Brabançonne^{nl} does not betray whether the gender is male or female, but cannot be used for a neuter substantive either, and referring to de Brabançonne by hij confirms the male interpretation of Dutch dialects. For the anthem name in English, as in Dutch, German, and of course French, Brabançonne can be considered a proper noun.)

== History ==
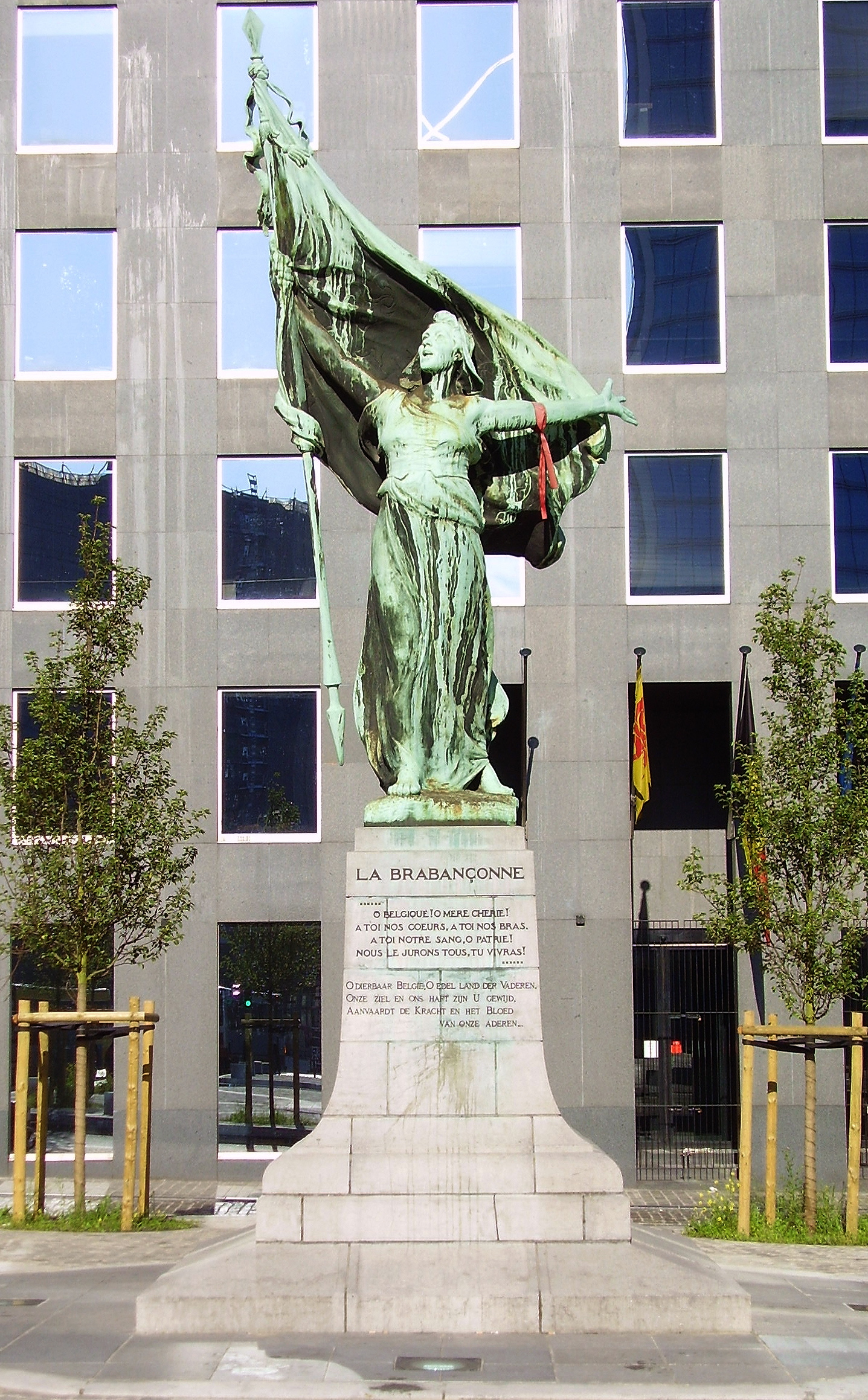
Monument for the anthem in Brussels

According to legend, the Belgian national anthem was written in September 1830, during the Belgian Revolution, by a young revolutionary called "Jenneval", who read the lyrics during a meeting at the Aigle d'Or café.

Jenneval, a Frenchman whose real name was Alexandre Dechet (sometimes known as Louis-Alexandre Dechet), wrote the Brabançonne. At the time, he was an actor at the theatre where, in August 1830, the revolution started, which led to independence from the Netherlands. Jenneval died in the war of independence. François van Campenhout composed the accompanying score, based on the tune of a French song called "L'Air des lanciers polonais" ("the tune of the Polish Lancers"), written by the French poet Eugène de Pradel, whose tune was itself an adaptation of the tune of a song, "L'Air du magistrat irréprochable", found in a popular collection of drinking songs called La Clé du caveau (The Key to the cellar) and it was first performed in September 1830.

In 1860, Belgium formally adopted the song and music as its national anthem, although the then prime minister, Charles Rogier, edited out lyrics attacking the Dutch House of Orange, inspired by the version written by Louis Hymans.

"The Brabançonne" is also the name of a monument (1930) by the sculptor Charles Samuel on the Surlet de Chokier square in Brussels. The monument contains partial lyrics of both the French and Dutch versions of the anthem. Like many elements in Belgian folklore, this is mainly based on the French "La Marseillaise" which is also both an anthem and the name of a monument – the sculptural group Departure of the Volunteers of 1792, commonly called La Marseillaise, at the base of the Arc de Triomphe in Paris.

== Lyrics ==
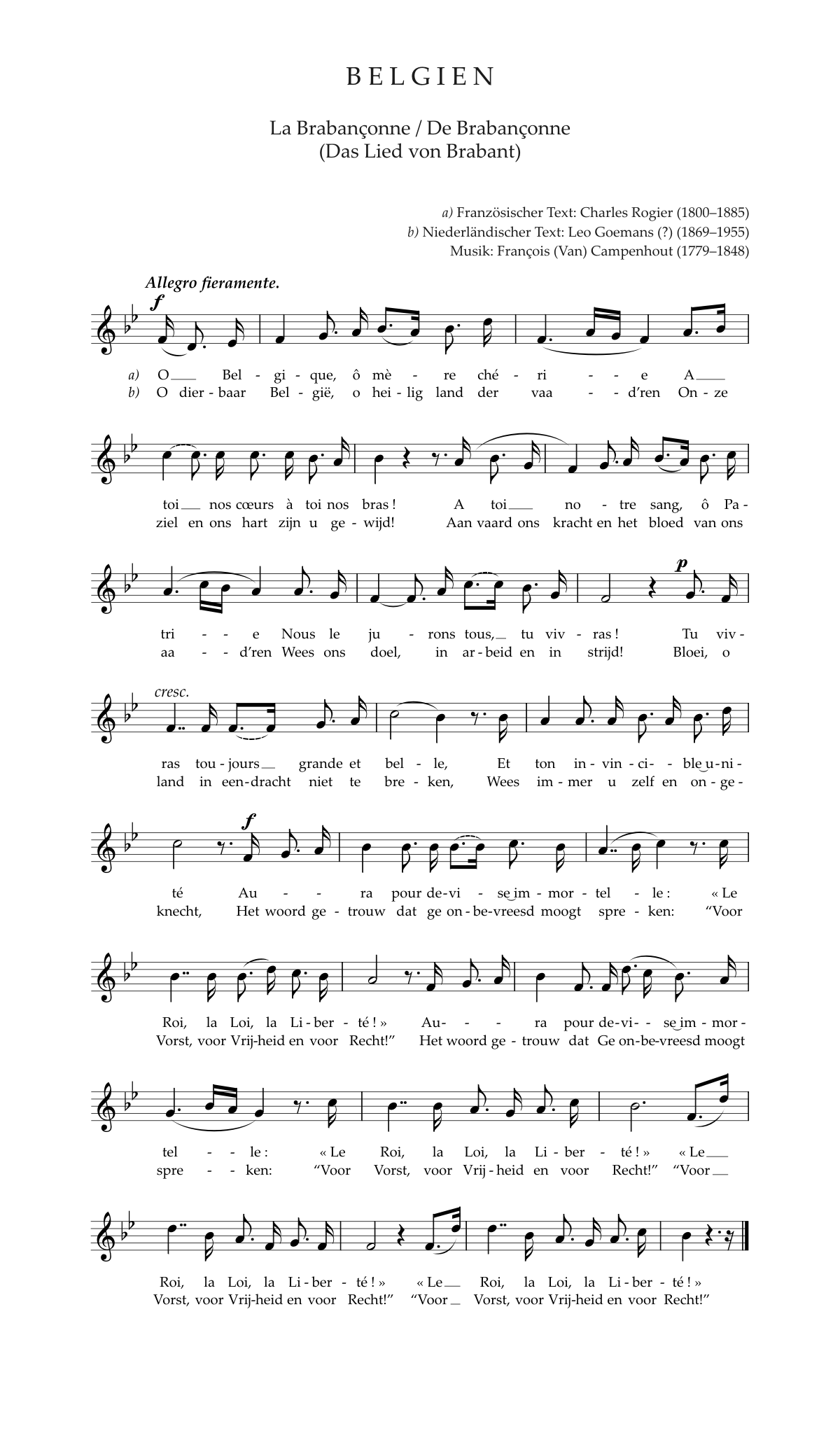
Score of the Brabançonne

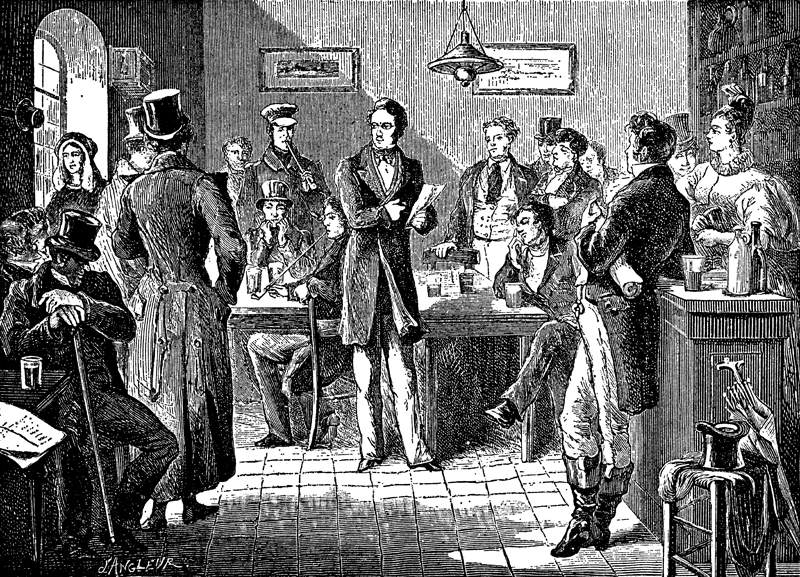
Lithograph of Jenneval

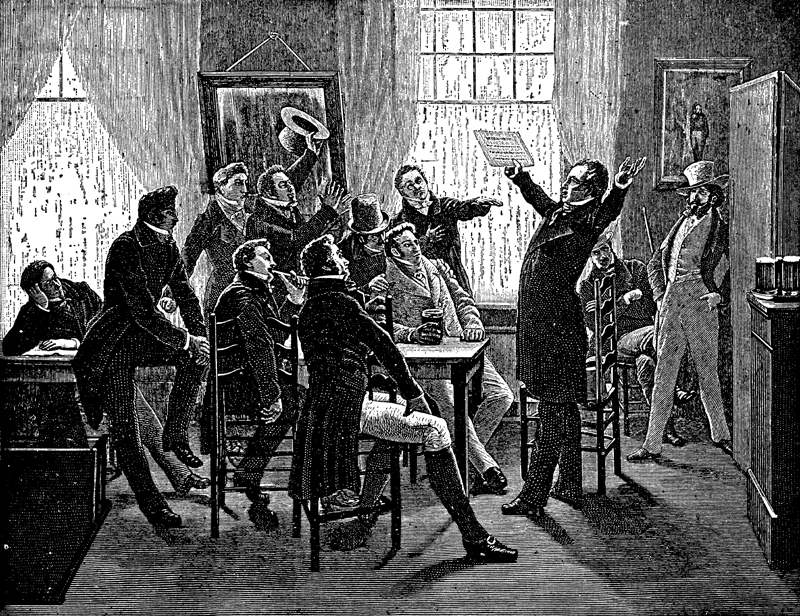
Lithograph of Campenhout singing the Brabançonne

=== 1830 original lyrics ===
==== First version (August 1830) ====
Dignes enfants de la Belgique
Qu'un beau délire a soulevés,
À votre élan patriotique
De grand succès sont réservés.
Restons armés que rien ne change !
Gardons la même volonté,
Et nous verrons refleurir l'Orange
Sur l'arbre de la Liberté.

Aux cris de meurtre et de pillage,
Des méchants s'étaient rassemblés,
Mais votre énergique courage
Loin de vous les a refoulés.
Maintenant, purs de cette fange
Qui flétrissait votre cité,
Amis, il faut greffer l'Orange
Sur l'arbre de la Liberté.

Et toi, dans qui ton peuple espère,
Nassau, consacre enfin nos droits;
Des Belges en restant le père
Tu seras l'exemple des rois.
Abjure un ministre étrange,
Rejette un nom trop détesté,
Et tu verras mûrir l'Orange
Sur l'arbre de la Liberté.

Mais malheur, si, de l'arbitraire
Protégeant les affreux projets,
Sur nous du canon sanguinaire,
Tu venais lancer les boulets !
Alors tout est fini, tout change,
Plus de pacte, plus de traité,
Et tu verras tomber l'Orange
De l'arbre de la Liberté.

Translation:

Worthy children of the Low Countries (Note: The Belgian Revolution was not originally separatist, but was a movement for further liberalization of the Netherlands and more rights for French language. The name of "Belgique" was taken from the Latin name of the Low Countries which was united in its entirety as the Netherlands and was during that time the official name of the Netherlands in the French language.)
Whom a fine passion has aroused,
To your patriotic fervour
Great successes lie in store.
Remain under arms, so that naught shall change!
Let us keep to the same will,
And we shall see Orange bloom anew
Upon the tree of Liberty. (Note: At this time was popular symbol of the French Revolution.)

To cries of murder and pillage,
The wicked had rallied around,
But your forceful courage
Has pushed them far away.
Now, pure of this filth
That was soiling your city,
Friends, we must graft Orange
Onto the tree of Liberty.

And you, in whom your people place their hopes,
Nassau, set firm our rights at last;
Remaining the father of the Belgians,
You'll be the example of kings.
Forswear a foreign minister,
Reject a too hated name,
And you will see Orange ripen
Upon the tree of Liberty.

But woe to you if, wilfully,
Pursuing dreadful plans,
At us, from the bloodthirsty cannon,
You came to fire the cannonballs!
Then all is over, all is changing;
No more pact, no more treaty,
And you shall see Orange fall
From the tree of Liberty.

==== Second version (September 1830) ====
Qui l'aurait cru ? ...de l'arbitraire
Consacrant les affreux projets,
Sur nous de l'airain militaire
Un prince a lancé les boulets.
C'en est fait ! Oui, Belges, tout change,
Avec Nassau plus d'indigne traité !
La mitraille a brisé l'Orange
Sur l'arbre de la Liberté.

Trop généreuse en sa colère,
La Belgique, vengeant ses droits,
D'un roi, qu'elle appelait son père,
N'implorait que de justes lois.
Mais lui dans sa fureur étrange,
Par le canon que son fils a pointé,
Au sang belge a noyé l'Orange
Sous l'arbre de la Liberté.

Fiers brabançons, peuples de braves,
Qu'on voit combattre sans fléchir,
Du sceptre honteux des Bataves,
Tes balles sauront t'affranchir.
Sur Bruxelles, au pied de l'archange,
Ton saint drapeau pour jamais est planté,
Et, fier de verdir sans l'Orange,
Croît l'arbre de la Liberté.

Et vous, objets de nobles larmes,
Braves, morts au feu des cannons,
Avant que la patrie en armes
Ait pu connaître au moins vos noms,
Sous l'humble terre où l'on vous range,
Dormez, martyrs, bataillon indompté !
Dormez en paix, loin de l'Orange,
Sous l'arbre de la Liberté.

Translation:

Who could have believed it? ...wilfully
Pursuing dreadful plans,
On us, with cannon's brass,
A prince has opened fire.
It has been done! Yes, Belgians, all is changing;
No more unworthy treaty with Nassau!
Grapeshot has shattered Orange
Upon the tree of Liberty.

Too generous in her anger,
Belgium, avenging her rights,
From a king, whom she called her father,
Sought no more than just laws.
But he, in his unexpected fury,
By the cannon aimed by his son
Has drowned Orange in Belgian blood
Beneath the tree of Liberty.

O proud, brave people of Brabant,
Seen not to flinch amid the fight,
From the Batavians' shameful sceptre
Your bullets will set you free.
On Brussels, together with the archangel (Note: St. Michael the Archangel, a patron saint of Brussels. The image seems to be of the Belgian flag flying from the towers of the Cathedral of St. Michael and St. Gudula, Brussels.)
Your holy flag is planted for ever;
And, proud to grow green without Orange,
Grows higher the tree of Liberty.

And you, objects of noble tears,
The brave, who died under cannon fire,
Before the Fatherland, under arms,
Could know at least your names,
Beneath the humble earth where you are laid,
Sleep, martyrs, unbroken battalion!
Sleep in peace, far from Orange,
Beneath the tree of Liberty.

==== Third version (1860) ====
Après des siècles et des siècles d'esclavage,
Le Belge sortant du tombeau
A reconquis par sa force et son courage
Son nom, ses droits et son drapeau.
Et ta main souveraine et fière,
Désormais, peuple indompté,
Grava sur ta vieille bannière :
Le Roi, la Loi, la Liberté !
Grava sur ta vieille bannière :
Le Roi, la Loi, la Liberté !

Marche de ton pas énergique,
Marche de progrès en progrès;
Dieu qui protège la Belgique,
Sourit à tes mâles succès.
Travaillons, notre labeur donne
À nos champs la fécondité !
Et la splendeur des arts couronne
Le Roi, la Loi, la Liberté !
Et la splendeur des arts couronne
Le Roi, la Loi, la Liberté !

Ouvrons nos rangs à d'anciens frères,
De nous trop longtemps désunis;
Belges, Bataves, plus de guerres.
Les peuples libres sont amis.
À jamais resserrons ensemble
Les liens de fraternité
Et qu'un même cri nous rassemble :
Le Roi, la Loi, la Liberté !
Et qu'un même cri nous rassemble :
Le Roi, la Loi, la Liberté !

Ô Belgique, ô mère chérie,
À toi nos cœurs, à toi nos bras !
À toi notre sang, ô Patrie !
Nous le jurons tous tu vivras !
Tu vivras toujours grande et belle
Et ton invincible unité
Aura pour devise immortelle :
Le Roi, la Loi, la Liberté !
Aura pour devise immortelle :
Le Roi, la Loi, la Liberté !

Translation:

After century on century in slavery,
The Belgian, arising from the tomb,
Has reconquered through his strength and courage
His name, his rights and his flag.
And now, undaunted people,
Your hand, sovereign and proud,
Has inscribed on your ancient banner:
The King, and Law, and Liberty!
Inscribed on your ancient banner:
The King, and Law, and Liberty!

March with your energetic step,
March with progress and progress;
God who protects Belgium,
Smile to you manly successes.
Let us work, our labor gives
to our fields fertility!
And the splendour of the arts coronate
The King, and Law, and Liberty!
And the splendour of the arts coronate
The King, and Law, and Liberty!

Let us open our ranks to old brothers,
Of us disunited for too long;
Belgians, Batavians, no more wars.
Free peoples are your friends.
Forever, let us tighten together
The links of fraternity
And that a single cry rally us
The King, and Law, and Liberty!
And that a single cry rally us
The King, and Law, and Liberty!

Noble Belgium, O dear mother
To you our hearts, to you our arms,
To you our blood, O Fatherland!
We all swear, you shall live!
You shall always live great and beautiful,
And your invincible unity
Shall have as an immortal motto:
The King, the Law, Liberty!
Shall have as an immortal motto:
The King, the Law, Liberty!

=== Current version ===
Various committees were charged with reviewing the text and tune of the Brabançonne and establishing an official version. A ministerial circular of the Ministry of the Interior on 8 August 1921 decreed that only the fourth verse of the text by Charles Rogier should be considered official for all three, French, German and in Dutch.

French (La Brabançonne)	IPA transcription (Note: See Help:IPA/French and French phonology.)	English translation
Noble Belgique, ô mère chérie, À toi nos cœurs, à toi nos bras, À toi notre sang, ô Patrie ! Nous le jurons tous, tu vivras ! Tu vivras toujours grande et belle Et ton invincible unité 𝄆 Aura pour devise immortelle : Le Roi, la Loi, la Liberté ! 𝄇 𝄆 Le Roi, la Loi, la Liberté ! 𝄇	[nɔ.blœ bɛl.ʒi.kœ | o mɛ.ʁø ʃe.ʁi.œ] [a twa no kœʁ | a twa no bʁa] [a twa nɔ.tʁœ sɑ̃ | o pa.tʁi.œ ǁ] [nu lø ʒy.ʁɔ̃ tus | ty vi.vʁa ǁ] [ty vi.vʁa tu.ʒuʁ ɡʁɑ̃d‿e bɛ.lœ] [e tɔ̃ ɛ̃.vɛ̃.sibl‿y.ni.te] 𝄆 [o.ʁa puʁ dø.vi.z(ø)(‿)i.mɔʁ.tɛ.lœ |] [lø ʁwa | la lwa | la li.bɛʁ.te ǁ] 𝄇 𝄆 [lø ʁwa | la lwa | la li.bɛʁ.te ǁ] 𝄇	Noble Belgium, O dear mother To you our hearts, to you our arms, To you our blood, O Fatherland! We all swear, you shall live! You shall always live great and beautiful, And your invincible unity 𝄆 Shall have as an immortal motto: The King, the Law, Liberty! 𝄇 𝄆 The King, the Law, Liberty! 𝄇
Dutch (De Brabançonne)	IPA transcription (Note: See Help:IPA/Dutch and Dutch phonology.)	English translation
O dierbaar België, O heilig land der Vaad'ren, Onze ziel en ons hart zijn u gewijd. Aanvaard ons kracht en het bloed van onze ad'ren, Wees ons doel in arbeid en in strijd. Bloei, o land, in eendracht niet te breken; Wees immer uzelf en ongeknecht, 𝄆 Het woord getrouw, dat g' onbevreesd moogt spreken, Voor Vorst, voor Vrijheid en voor Recht! 𝄇 𝄆 Voor Vorst, voor Vrijheid en voor Recht! 𝄇	[oː(w) ˈdiːr.baːr ˈbɛɫ.ɣ(i)jø̜ | oː(w) ˈɦɛi̯.ləx lɑn‿dɛr ˈvaː.drən |] [ˈɔn.zø̜ ziɫ ɛn ɔns ɦɑrt zɛi̯n y ɣø̜.ˈʋɛi̯t ǁ] [aːn.ˈvaːrt ɔns krɑxt ɛn ɦø̜t blut vɑn ˈɔn.zø̜ ˈaː.drən |] [ʋeː(i̯)s ɔns dul ɪn ˈɑr.bɛi̯t ɛn ɪn strɛi̯t ǁ] [blui̯ | oː(w) lɑnt | ɪn ˈeː(i̯)n.drɑxt nit tø̜ ˈbreː(i̯).kən |] [ʋeː(i̯)s ˈɪ.mø̜r y.ˈzɛɫf ɛn ˌɔn.ɣø̜.ˈknɛxt |] 𝄆 [ɦət ʋoːrt ɣø̜.ˈtrɑu | dɑt ɣ(ø̜)(‿)ɔn.bø̜.ˈvreː(i̯)st moː(w)xt ˈspreː(i̯).kən |] [voːr vɔrst | voːr ˈvrɛi.ɦɛi̯t ɛn voːr rɛxt ǁ] 𝄇 𝄆 [voːr vɔrst | voːr ˈvrɛi.ɦɛi̯t ɛn voːr rɛxt ǁ] 𝄇	O dear Belgium, O holy land of the fathers, Our soul and our heart are devoted to you. Accept our strength and the blood in our veins, Be our goal in labour and in strife. Prosper, O land, in unbreakable unity; Always be yourself and unenslaved, 𝄆 Faithful to the word that you may speak fearlessly, For King, for Freedom and for Justice! 𝄇 For King, for Freedom and for Justice! 𝄇
German (Die Brabançonne)	IPA transcription (Note: See Help:IPA/German and German phonology.)	English translation
O liebes Land, o Belgiens Erde, Dir unser Herz, Dir unsere Hand, Dir unser Blut, o Heimaterde, wir schwören's Dir, o Vaterland! So blühe froh in voller Schöne, zu der die Freiheit Dich erzog, 𝄆 und fortan singen Deine Söhne: Gesetz und König und die Freiheit hoch! 𝄇 𝄆 Gesetz und König und die Freiheit hoch! 𝄇	[oː ˈliː.bəs lant | oː ˈbɛl.ɡi̯əns ˈʔeːɐ̯.də |] [diːɐ̯ ˈʔʊn.zɐ hɛɐ̯t͡s | diːɐ̯ ˈʔʊn.zʁə hant | ] [diːɐ̯ ˈʔʊn.zɐ bluːt | oː ˈhaɪ̯.ma(ː)t.ʔeːɐ̯.də |] [viːɐ̯ ˈʃvøː.ʁəns diːɐ̯ | oː ˈfaː.tɐˌlant ǁ] [zoː ˈblyː.ə fʁoː ʔɪn ˈfɔ.lɐ ˈʃøː.nə |] [t͡suː deːɐ̯ diː ˈfʁaɪ̯.haɪ̯t dɪç ʔɛɐ̯.ˈt͡soːk |] 𝄆 [ʔʊnt fɔʁt.ˈʔan ˈzɪŋ.ən ˈdaɪ̯.nə ˈzøː.nə |] [ɡə.ˈzɛts ʊnt ˈkøː.nɪç ʔʊn‿diː ˈfʁaɪ̯.haɪ̯t hoːx ǁ] 𝄇 𝄆 [ɡə.ˈzɛts ʊnt ˈkøː.nɪç ʔʊn‿diː ˈfʁaɪ̯.haɪ̯t hoːx ǁ] 𝄇	O dear country, O Belgium's soil; To you our heart, to you our hand, To you our blood, O homeland, We swear it to you, O fatherland! So bloom happily in full beauty, To which freedom has raised you, 𝄆 And henceforth your sons sing: Law and King and Freedom high! 𝄇 𝄆 Law and King and Freedom high! 𝄇

=== Modern short trilingual version ===
In recent years, an unofficial short version of the anthem is sung during Belgian National Day on 21 July each year, combining the words of the anthem in all three of Belgium's official languages, similar to the bilingual version of "O Canada". The lyrics are from the 4th verse of the anthem.

Language	No.	Line	IPA transcription	Translation
Dutch	1	O dierbaar België, O heilig land der Vaad'ren,	[oː(w) ˈdiːr.baːr ˈbɛɫ.ɣ(i)jø̜ | oː(w) ˈɦɛi̯.ləx lɑn‿dɛr ˈvaː.drən |]	O dear Belgium, O holy land of the fathers –
Dutch	2	Onze ziel en ons hart zijn u gewijd.	[ˈɔn.zø̜ ziɫ ɛn ɔns ɦɑrt zɛi̯n y ɣø̜.ˈʋɛi̯t ǁ]	Our soul and our heart are devoted to you!
French	3	À toi notre sang, ô Patrie !	[a twa nɔ.tʁœ sɑ̃ | o pa.tʁi.œ ǁ]	With blood to spill for you, O fatherland!
French	4	Nous le jurons tous, tu vivras !	[nu lø ʒy.ʁɔ̃ tus | ty vi.vʁa ǁ]	We swear with one cry – You shall live!
German	5	So blühe froh in voller Schöne,	[zoː ˈblyː.ə fʁoː ʔɪn ˈfɔ.lɐ ˈʃøː.nə |]	So gladly bloom in beauty full,
German	6	zu der die Freiheit Dich erzog,	[t͡suː deːɐ̯ diː ˈfʁaɪ̯.haɪ̯t dɪç ʔɛɐ̯.ˈt͡soːk |]	Into what freedom has taught you to be,
German	7	und fortan singen Deine Söhne:	[ʔʊnt fɔʁt.ˈʔan ˈzɪŋ.ən ˈdaɪ̯.nə ˈzøː.nə |]	And evermore shall sing your sons:
French	8	Le Roi, la Loi, la Liberté !	[lø ʁwa | la lwa | la li.bɛʁ.te ǁ]	The King, the Law, the Liberty!
Dutch	9	Het woord getrouw, dat g' onbevreesd moogt spreken,	[ɦət ʋoːrt ɣø̜.ˈtrɑu | dɑt ɣ‿ɔn.bø̜.ˈvreː(i̯)st moː(w)xt ˈspreː(i̯).kən |]	Faithful to the word that you may speak boldly,
Dutch	10	Voor Vorst, voor Vrijheid en voor Recht!	[voːr vɔrst | voːr ˈvrɛi.ɦɛi̯t ɛn voːr rɛxt ǁ]	For King, for Freedom and for Law!
German	11	Gesetz und König und die Freiheit hoch!	[ɡə.ˈzɛts ʊnt ˈkøː.nɪç ʔʊn‿diː ˈfʁaɪ̯.haɪ̯t hoːx ǁ]	To Law and King and Freedom, hail!
French	12	Le Roi, la Loi, la Liberté !	[lø ʁwa | la lwa | la li.bɛʁ.te ǁ]	The King, the Law, the Liberty!

== See also ==
- "De Vlaamse Leeuw"
- "Le Chant des Wallons"
- Place des Martyrs, Brussels
- "Vers l'avenir"
- "Le Plat Pays"
