= Alfons Rissberger =

German entrepreneur (b. 1948)

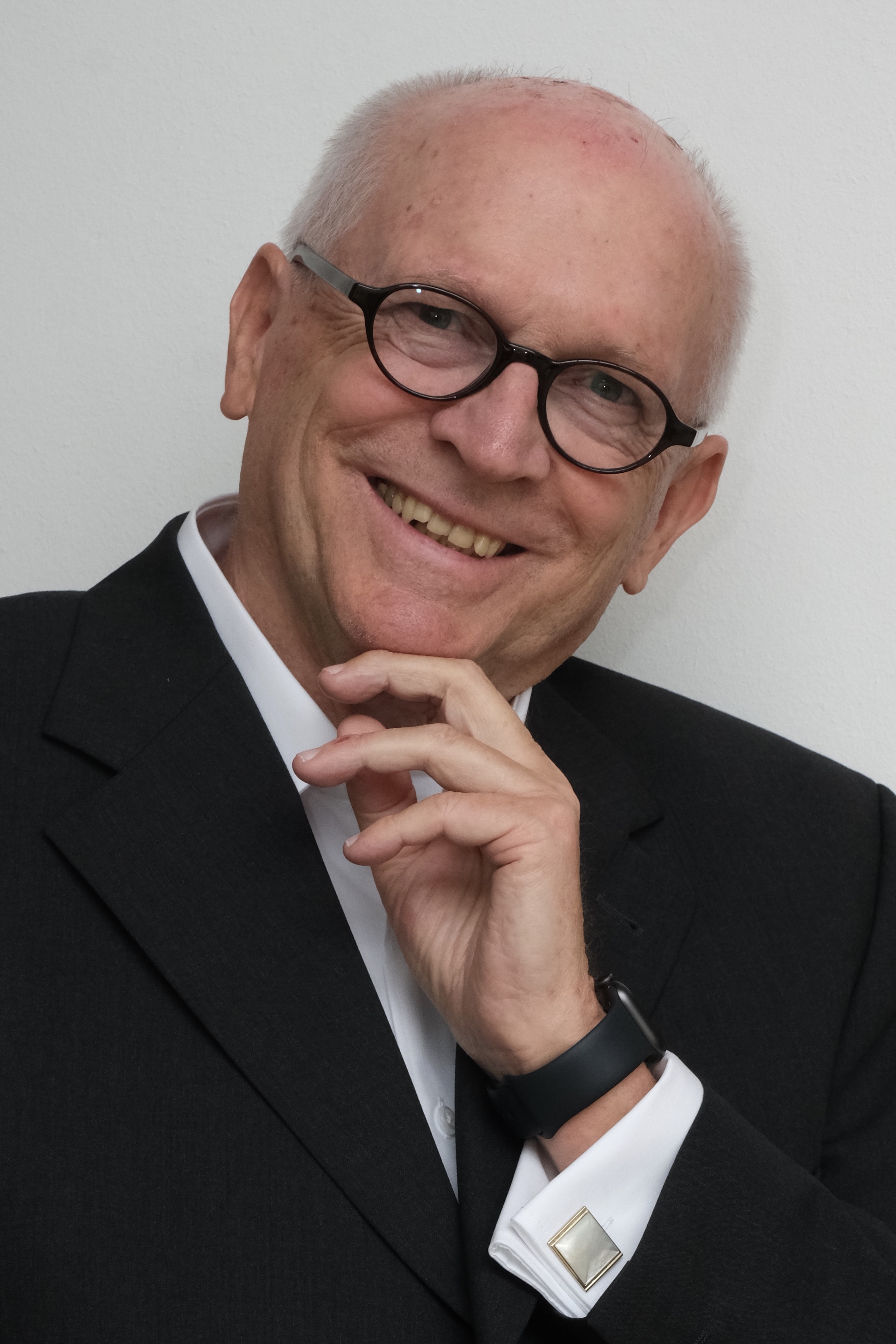
- Rissberger in 2020
- Born: May 25, 1948 (age 78); Worms, Germany
- Citizenship: German
- Education: Technische Universität Darmstadt (M.A.)
- Occupations: Entrepreneur, business consultant, author
- Known for: Initiator and founding board member of Initiative D21
- Website: www.rissberger.de

Alfons Rissberger (born May 25, 1948) is a German entrepreneur, business consultant, and writer.

== Early life ==
Rissberger was born in Worms, Germany, in 1948. His father was a locksmith.

He studied an apprenticeship in television technology-craftsmanship, followed by further study in Frankfurt and Darmstadt in electrical engineering, computer sciences, and vocational education. He focused on educational psychology and political sciences. He holds a diploma in engineering and completed the first and second state examinations in vocational education.

== Career ==
He financed his studies by working as a night cargo workman at Frankfurt Airport and by setting up informatics-course-systems at community colleges in Frankfurt-Höchst and Worms. The concept of these informatics-courses was the foundation for recommendations by the Gesellschaft für Informatik ("German Informatics Society") and by the Deutsche Volkshochschul-Verband e.V. ("German Community College Union") for vocational education.

From 1970 until 1991 he taught and led activities in colleges. He also provided advanced training to executive managers in businesses. As a college professor, his focus was applied informatics, though he also taught informatics, trade, foreign business, taxation, and tourism at the University of Applied Sciences of the state Rhineland-Palatinate, Worms. He lectured for ten years at the BASF-Führungskolleg at the University Seminary of Economy in the water castle Gracht in Liblar near Cologne.

Since 1974 Rissberg has been a political and economical consultant with an emphasis on success and efficiency in the IT-age. He is a surveyor at the Enquete-Komission Deutschlands Weg in die Informationsgesellschaft (Enquete-Commission Germany's path to an information society) of the German Bundestag, a member of the science advisory council of the Konrad Adenauer Foundation, a chairman of the Mecklenburg-Vorpommern multimedia advisory council, a leader of e-learning research projects, and an author of textbooks, television, and video productions.

From 1985 to 1993 Rissberger was the head of the department for new information and communication technologies at the Ministry of Education, Science and Advanced Training Rheinland-Pfalz, Mainz. He was responsible for the introduction of IT basic education in secondary education in all public schools within the state. He is also the editor of the first German IT basic education schoolbook published by Klett-Verlag. Rissberger was a leader of a number of German and European first-time BLK-model-experiments in e-learning. He generated ideas for new school formats (such as the technical collage for informatics) and new vocational training areas.

In 1987 he was the first German scientist who was responsible for a model experiment by the Federal State Commission for education management and research support (BLK) which studied e-learning at an elementary school. From 1985 to 1993 Rissberger was responsible for IT basic education (ITG) and e-learning in the Rhineland-Palatinate's education system.

From 1993 until 2005 he was the managing director of DVZ Datenverarbeitungszentrums Mecklenburg-Vorpommern GmbH (data processing center). Since that time he owns the business Rissberger Strategie Consulting in Hamburg and Schwerin.

In 1994, he founded the Berlin memorandum Aktiver Lernen: Multimedia für eine bessere Bildung (lit. "Active Learning: Multimedia for a Better Education).

In 1999, he was a founding board member of Initiative D21 with chancellor Gerhard Schröder as chairman of the advisory council.

Rissberger was the founder and managing director of DVZ Consulting GmbH in Schwerin.

In 2001 Rissberger demanded a focused national project "e-learning in the German-speaking educational system" with a concept for the first virtual University in Germany: "VirtuS- Virtual University Schwerin", but the project was never completed.

He has owned Rissberger Strategie Consulting in Hamburg and Schwerin since 2006.

In 2007, he started and co-edited the Berlin memorandum VirtusD Virtuelle Universität Deutschland – E-Learning für eine bessere Bildung an den Hochschulen (lit. "VirtusD Virtual University Germany – e-learning for a Better Education at Universities").

== Projects ==
- 2007 initiator and co-editor of the Berlin memorandum "VirtusD Virtuelle Universität Deutschland" (VirtusD Virtual University Germany)
- 1999 idea generator and founding board member of Initiative D21 (today: biggest European partnership between politics and economy)
- 1998 initiator and leader of the "IIR-Seminar Informationstechnologie für Führungskräfte" (IIR Seminar Information Technology for Managers)
- 1994 Co-author of the Berliner Memorandum Multimedia für eine bessere Bildung (Berlin memorandum multimedia for better education)
- 1991 BLK-model-experiment CLIP (Computer supported learning in primary education; first model-experiment in Germany at primary schools on the basis of Windows)
- 1988 BLK-model-experiment CULAS (Computer supported learning at public schools; first model-experiment in Germany on the basis of MS-DOS)
- 1987 BLK-model-experiment TOAM (first model-experiment in Europe about the usage of computer supported learning systems at all public schools including primary schools)
- 1987 initiator and editor of the first German IT basic education schoolbook published by Klett-Verlag
- 1986 initiator and co-author of the video production Computers in the work environment of the German Sparkassen- und Giroverbandes
- 1985 BLK-model-experiment microcomputers at technical schools (MATS)
- 1985 ITG-Schulfernsehen der ARD (ITG School Television, ARD)
- 1985 BLK-model-experiment Informationsstelle Schule und Computer (Information point school and computer)
- 1985 BLK-model-experiment Informationstechnische Grundbildung (ITG)
- 1984 initiator and author of the first German schoolbook on informatics for technical vocations (Teubner-Verlag)
- 1983 founder and idea generator of the "Höhere Berufsfachschule Informatik" (vocational collage for informatics), Bildungszentrum Worms
- 1982 initiator of the new vocation "micro electrician" to the federal government (issued 1997)

== Personal life ==
He has been married twice and has two children with his first wife.

== Literature ==
- 1984 initiator and co-editor of the first German schoolbook by "Putkammer/Rissberger: informatics for technical vocations" (Teubner-Verlag)
- 1986 initiator and co-editor of the first German schoolbook "IT basic education (ITG)" (Klett-Verlag). In 1990 Rissberger had already pointed toward the foundations and effects of e-learning in his "outlook".
- 1993 publisher of "Abschlussbericht des Modellversuchs CULAS Computerunterstütztes Lernen an allgemeinbildenden Schulen" (final report on the model-experiment CULAS Computer supported learning at public schools), for ministry of education and cultural affairs in Rhineland-Palatinate (by Hase & Koehler Verlag Mainz)

== Publications ==
- Computerunterricht an den Schulen: Kein "neuer Fall Mengenlehre (Handelsblatt, 26. February 1985; PDF-Datei; 2.67 MB)
- Bei der dritten falschen Antwort sagt der Computer vor (Frankfurter Allgemeine Zeitung, 25. June 1987)
- Die Computerisierung der Kinderzimmer (Frankfurter Allgemeine Zeitung, 22. March 1993)
- "Moderne Analphabeten" Bildungsexperte Alfons Rissberger über Computer im Unterricht, Interview "DER SPIEGEL" 48/94
- 1994 Ideengeber und Mitautor Berliner Memorandum "aktiver lernen – Multimedia für eine bessere Bildung"
- Innovation aus Verantwortung (Frankfurter Allgemeine Zeitung, 15. November 1994)
- Bildungsexperte Rissberger fordert mehr Computer im Unterricht Bedenkentraeger in den Behoerden bremsen Multimedia-Entwicklung (Computerwoche vom 17. February 1995)
- Eine kleine Zeitreise – Ein Schultag im Jahr 2004 (Frankfurter Allgemeine Zeitung, 7. March 1995)
- Der Deutsche redet noch, wenn andere längst handeln (Frankfurter Allgemeine Zeitung, 12. March 1996)
- Von der Wachskerze zur Glühbirne (Frankfurter Allgemeine Zeitung, 11. March 1997)
- Tele-Teaching in Rheinland-Pfalz (Frankfurter Allgemeine Zeitung Nr. 291, 15. December 1998)
- Mit Imbiss und Rezept (Wirtschaftswoche 51/1998)
- Multimedia in jedes Klassenzimmer (Spiegel 38/1999)
- Beruf und Chance (Frankfurter Allgemeine Zeitung Nr. 31, 6. February 1999)
- Neues Schulfach PC (Frankfurter Allgemeine Zeitung, 22. February 2000)
- IT für Führungskräfte? (Frankfurter Allgemeine Zeitung, 20. March 2001)
- Tatort Schwerin Verschwendung von Steuermillionen an Universitäten (DeutschlandRadio Berlin, 8. October 2002; PDF-Datei; 11 kB)
- IT vernichtet Arbeitsplätze (Frankfurter Allgemeine Zeitung, 11. March 2003)
- Wir lügen uns selbst in die Tasche (Spiegel, 22. March 2004; PDF-Datei; 236 kB)
- Neutrale Plattform für Vordenker: Sozialer Sprengstoff erster Ordnung (WELT am SONNTAG, 4. April 2004; PDF-Datei; 19 kB)
- Initiative D21 – "Leuchttürme für die Informationsgesellschaft" (Zeitschrift "Das Parlament", Marco Heinen, 24. April 2006; PDF-Datei; 19 kB)
- Berliner Memorandum "VirtusD Virtuelle Universität Deutschland – E-Learning für eine bessere Bildung an den Hochschulen", Pressekonferenz 13. January 2007; u. a. veröffentlicht von der Freien Universität Berlin
- Nur noch neun Wochen pro Jahr an der Uni. In Schwerin soll die erste virtuelle Universität Deutschlands entstehen. (Deutschlandfunk, Deutschlandradio Kultur, 7. January 2011)
- Oxford in Meck-Pomm (Frankfurter Allgemeine Zeitung, 8. January 2011; PDF-Datei; 29 kB)
- Die virtuelle Uni machts möglich (Die Welt vom 16. October 2012)
- Gründungsinitiative für virtuelle Uni (Schweriner Volkszeitung vom 17. Oktober 2012; PDF-Datei; 917 kB)
- Fernstudium mit Computer (Zeitung für die Landeshauptstadt vom 30. May 2014)
