= Alphons Bellesheim =

Christian Peter "Alphons" Maria Joseph Bellesheim (16 December 1839 Monschau, Germany - 5 February 1912 Aachen, Germany) was a church historian. He also reviewed and collected books.

== Family ==
Alphons was the son of Heinrich "Wilhelm" Ludwig Joseph Bellesheim (26 December 1801 Essen, Germany - 1867 Aachen, Germany) and Maria Anna "Margaretha" Dumesnil (15 March 1797 Aachen, Germany - 1866 Aachen, Germany). His parents were married on 27 June 1838 in Monschau, Germany. Alphons' paternal grandparents were Carl Anton Bellesheim and Maria Josepha Helena Hennekes. His maternal grandparents were Carl Dumesnil and Christina Windhagen.

Alphons had one known brother, Hugo Franz Julius Bellesheim. Hugo was born on 3 February 1841 in Monschau and married to Hulda Caecilia Kelsch on 4 October 1866 in Aachen. A Hugo Bellesheim, aged 27 years, arrived at the Port of New York on 30 August 1867 having departed from Hamburg, Germany on the ship Germanic. It is unknown, but assumed that the two are the same.

== Life ==
The son of the pharmacist s Wilhelm Bellesheim (1801–1867) studied Roman Catholic theology at the universities of Bonn and Tübingen and attended thereafter the theological college of Cologne. After his ordination of priest s in the year 1862 he was assumed as chaplain at the Santa Maria dell'Anima, where he was active 1862 and where he obtained his doctorate in the last month of his time in Rome.

After his return to Germany he became vicar at the Cologne Cathedral and also secretary of the general vicariate. As a result of the Kulturkampf in the 1870th he had to quit his tasks. Subsequently, in the following more than 25 years he was active in the scientific-theological research and published a lot of publications, including 10 books, 4 brochures, 148 essays and 77 inscriptions in dictionaries. One of his focus areas was the history of Christianity of the British Isles.

Finally in 1902 Bellesheim was appointed as provost at the Aachen Cathedral and he practised this ministry until his death in 1912 and was in the meantime honoured with the title as a Protonotary apostolic.

== Publications and books (option) ==
- Giuseppe Cardinal Mezzofanti : Ein Lebensbild aus der Kirchengeschichte des 18. und 19. Jahrhunderts, Woerl, Würzburg 1879
- Die Elementarschulen im katholischen England, Foesser, Frankfurt a. M. 1882
- History of the Catholic Church of Scotland: From the Introduction of Christianity to the Present Day. Clarke Press. February 2008. ISBN 978-1-4086-4257-3
- Geschichte der Katholischen Kirche in Schottland von der Einführung des Christenthums bis auf die Gegenwart, Vol. 1−2, Kirchheim, Mainz 1883
- Wilhelm Cardinal Allen und die englischen Seminare auf dem Festlande, Mainz 1885
- Geschichte der Katholischen Kirche in Irland von der Einführung des Christenthums bis auf die Gegenwart, Vol. 1−3, Kirchheim, Mainz 1890/91
- Henry Edward Manning; Cardinal-Erzbischof von Westminster (1808–1892), Kirchheim, Mainz 1892
- Charles Cardinal Lavigerie, Erzbischof von Karthago und Primas von Afrika (1825–1892), In: Der Katholik, Zeitschrift für katholische Wissenschaft und kirchliches Leben, 27. Jg., Mag. 3, P. 248–266 und Mag. 4, P. 356–377, Kirchheim, Mainz 1897
