= Barasana =

Amazonian group or people

Barasano man of the Pira-Paraná River

Barasana (alternate names Barazana, Panenua, Pareroa, or Taiwano is an exonym applied to an Amazonian people, considered distinct from the Taiwano, though the dialect of the latter is almost identical to that of the Barasana, and outside observers can detect only minute differences between the two languages. They are a Tucanoan group located in the eastern part of the Amazon Basin in Vaupés Department in Colombia (Apaporis River) and Amazonas State in Brazil. As of 2000, there were at least 500 Barasanas in Colombia, although some recent estimates place the figure as high as 1,950. A further 40 live on the Brazilian side, in the municipalities of Japurá and São Gabriel da Cachoeira.

The Barasana refers to themselves as the jebá.~baca, or people of the jaguar (Jebá "jaguar" is their mythical ancestor).

== Geography, ecology ==
Barasana territory lies in the central sector of the Colombian Northwest Amazon. The Barasana inhabit the Pirá-piraná river basin of the Comiseria de Vaupés between the two main river systems of the Vaupés River and the Japurá River . The area is a tropical rainforest, interspersed with occasional stands of Mauritia flexuosa or mirití palm and savanna with xerophytic vegetation. Rainfall averages around 3,500 mm (140 in) per year.

Its climate is marked by four seasons, a long dry spell from December to March followed by the wet season from March to August, a short dry season between August and September, followed by a rainy season from September until December. The average temperature varies between 20 and 30 degrees Celsius (68 and 86 °F). It is notorious for its treacherous rivers that are choked with dangerous rapids and falls. The number of faunal species is not rich, and individual animals not common, though hunting game is prized as the fundamentally male mode of procuring food. Fish also, despite the many rivers, do not abound.

== Ethnic group context ==
The Vaupés area is inhabited by roughly 20 tribes or descent groups. The word tribe is generally disdained by anthropologists, who prefer to define groups by such terms as sib, language group, exogamous group or phratry, living in an unbounded system, that is cosmopolitan and multilingual. Apart from the Maku and the Arawakan language families, the indigenous peoples of the Vaupés belong to Eastern Tukanoan languages, most prominent of them being, other than the Barasana, the Desana, the Bará, the Tukano proper, the Macuna, the Tatuyo, and the Cubeo. Despite the established system of intermarriage, their languages are mutually unintelligible. A Creole-type lingua franca, called locally lingua geral, created by the Jesuit missionaries as a general language for communicating with Indians in the lower reaches of the Amazon, is also spoken among them.

== History ==
The various Tukanoan myths of origin refer to a westward upstream migration from Brazil, and Reichel-Dolmatoff believes that there is a ‘kernel of historical truth’ behind these uniform traditions. Curt Nimuendajú thought that the east Tukanoan tribes invaded from the west, and that the autochthonous population consisted of the Makú, assuming that these smaller hunter-gatherers were older than the agriculturalist newcomers. Desultory Spanish contact with the Vaupés region goes back to the 16th century. But historical records show that the Tukano peoples shifted to the remote headwaters of the Río Negro as a refuge, in flight from the slave trade and diseases, and forced relocations introduced by the Portuguese in the late 18th.century. It was Alfred Russel Wallace, in travelling up the Vaupés river in 1850 who first took note of Indians like the Barasana and their dialects. and the rites of their Yurupary cult. According to his account, traders were already active in the area. Catholic and Protestant missionaries entered the area in the last decades of the 19th century. One major reaction to this evangelisation in the Vaupés, initiated by Venancio Aniseto Kamiko, was to create a wave of messianic cults among the tribes. Missionaries were convinced that the central cult of Yurupary, their culture hero, was the work of the Devil, though this was a series of rituals rather than a divinity. The result was widespread damage to the native culture. as ceremonial houses were burnt, ritual ornaments destroyed, and secret masks displayed to the tribe's women and children, who were previously forbidden to look at them. Messianic shamanism, strongly connected with jaguar shamanism, declined further with the establishment of Catholic missions in the first decades of the 20th century. The German traveller Theodor Koch-Grünberg spent two years at the turn of the century (1903–05) travelling throughout the region and provided a classic account of the Indians’ material culture and languages, which long remained the authoritative source for information of these tribes. Rubber-gatherers from the beginning of the 20th century began to aggressively exploit the area, as they did again the World War II when the urgency of improved rubber supplies led to a rubber boom in the area. Their violent presence caused considerable upheaval and suffering, finally driving the Indians, after fierce resistance, into the less accessible backwaters. Population decline, as a result, has been a marked feature of the past one hundred and fifty years, The earliest professional ethnological fieldwork was done by Irving Goldman in 1939-40 among the Cubeo Indians. Postwar missionary work, colonizing movements, and the activities of the linguists attached to Christian proselytisation still engage, according to Stephen Hugh-Jones, in the ‘criminal folly’ of ethnocide by their programmatic hostility to traditional religion

== Economy ==
The Barasana are slash-and-burn swidden horticulturalists who supplement their food with hunting and fish-gathering, with different roles allocated to men (poisoners) and women (gatherers of the poisoned catch). The economy is inelastic, subsistence-oriented and egalitarian. As both hunter-gatherers, and gardeners, the Barasana exploit the forest in various ways to obtain a wide variety of foodstuffs. Bread made of bitter cassava is their staple food; Barasana culture itself is said to be grounded on cultivation of cassava production. but they also harvest maize, bananas, cooking plantains, yams, sweet potatoes, pineapples, sugarcane and considerable quantities of fruits picked in the forests or from cultivated trees like the Pithecellobium dulce, the "Madras thorn" or mene. Fishing supplies most of the protein in their diet, supplemented by game, rodents and birds mostly, but woolly monkeys and peccaries are also culled, traditionally with blowguns, but most recently also with shotguns. Unlike most South American peoples, the Barasana are not particularly passionate about honey, which they gather occasionally. Beeswax, on the other hand, is highly prized for its use in ceremonial contexts. From cassava leaves they extract a native chicha. Coca and tobacco, the latter prepared either in cigars or as snuff, are also cultivated. They prepare their local entheogenic drink ayahuasca, which they call yagé, from the endemic Banisteriopsis caapi, a liana locally known as "vine of the soul" or "vine of the ancestors".

== Social structure ==
The Tukunoan descent groups are subdivided into ranked and named sibs. The dominant feature of their social organization is language group exogamy, which requires that one must always marry a spouse speaking a language different from one's own. Among the Barasana themselves, exceptions however do exist to the principle of linguistic exogamy, since they intermarry with Taiwanos whose language is regarded as almost identical to their own. This means that one's father's language determines one's inclusion or exclusion in Barasana identity, which accounts for the custom of virilocality. Women marrying out, though speaking Barasana as their native tongue, are therefore excluded from Barasana identity. Concern for exogamy is obsessive and is considered by Reichel-Dolmstoff to be the most important social rule of all.

The Vaupés social system may be divided in four units in ascending hierarchy, namely (a) the local descent group, (2) the sib, (3) the language-aggregate, and finally (4) the phratry. Kinship is based on a 'Dravidian' type sib system, with bilateral cross-cousin marriage between people from hierarchically order patrilineal sibs. Like most other groups of the Vaupés system, the Barasana are an exogamous patrilineal and patrilocal descent group, with a segmentary social structure. The constitutive groups live in isolated settlements in units of four to eight families dwelling in multifamily longhouses.

The Barasana have seven exogamous phratries, and five sibs, common descendants of the Yebi Meni Anaconda people, traditionally ranked hierarchically in decreasing order of seniority, with each assigned a distinct ritual role as (1) Koamona, ritual chiefs (2) Rasegana, dancers and chanters (3) Meni Masa, warriors (4) Daria, shamans and (5) Wabea, cigar lighters. These ritual functions restricted to distinct sibs, reflect a dying tradition, and survive now mainly as a matter of ideology. Barasana society is rigidly divided along sexual lines. Men and women enter dwellings by different doors, pass most of their lives in separation, a reality reinforced by their ceremonial Yurupari rites. Yet in Vaupés societies women have higher status, and marriages are more stable than in other South Amerindian groups, perhaps since intertribal warfare ended several decades ago, which may explain why women are not ‘pawns in the displays of male brinksmanship.’

== Language ==
Barasana is classified as one of the eastern Tucanoan languages. It is mutually intelligible with Taiwano, and both are considered dialect variations of each other, though it is reported that Taiwano speakers are assimilating to the Barasana with whom they have very close relations of exchange, leading them to adopt the Barasana tongue.

== Popular culture ==
The Barasana were the subject of Disappearing World (TV series), episode 4, The War of the Gods, aired on 22 June 1971 for British Granada Television. The episode shows four young anthropologists travelling into the jungle to show how to live as a Barasana, before getting into a deeper debate about what it means to be a marginalised tribe in a changing world and documenting Barasana magical rituals and traditions.
