= Barasana-Eduria language =

Tucanoan language spoken in Colombia

Barasana-Eduria
- Taiwano
- Jãnerã-Eduria Oca
- Native to: Colombia
- Ethnicity: Barasana, Eduria
- Native speakers: (1,900 cited 1993 census)
- Language family: Tucanoan: Eastern Tucanoan; South; Barasana–Macuna; Barasana-Eduria
- Dialects: Barasana (Southern Barasano, Jãnerã); Eduria (Taiwano)

Language codes
- ISO 639-3: bsn
- Glottolog: bara1380
- ELP: Barasano
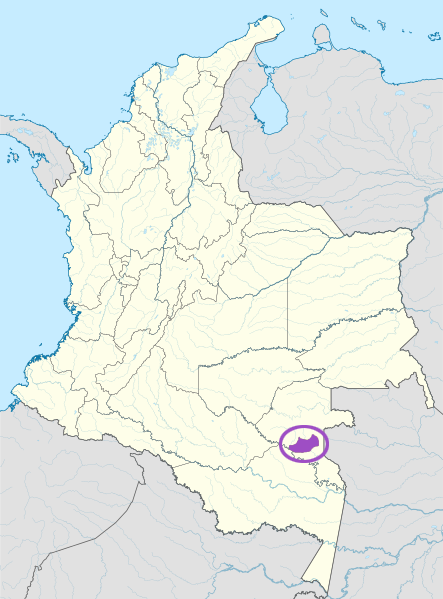

- Barasana is classified as Severely Endangered in Brazil and Critically Endangered in Colombia by the UNESCO Atlas of the World's Languages in Danger.

Barasana is a Tucanoan language of Colombia. It belongs to the Eastern branch of the Tucanoan family and is spoken in the Amazonian region by the Barasana people. The population of its native speakers is about 1,990 according to a census taken in 1993. Native speakers' tribes are spread out along the Pira Paraná River in Colombia and the banks of the Vaupés River Basin.

The different dialects within this language group utilize their individual varieties as barriers to distinguish themselves through their own identity. Marriages between two people who speak the same language are taboo, as it is seen as akin to marrying their own brothers and sisters. Instead, Barasanans participate in exogamous marriages, which promote multilingualism of the people in the region. This also serves as an explanation for similarities between different dialects in the region. Barasana and Eduria are often considered separate languages by the individuals of these groups, who are allowed to intermarry. However, the languages' similarities are up to 98%; the other 2% accounts for minor differences in phonology.

Many grammatical characteristics of Barasana distinguish it from various other groups in the language family. Out of the Eastern Tucanoan languages, Barasana is the only one to maintain a three-way distinction between spatial and temporal distances. It also differs in many other aspects, such as nasality, phoneme inventories, and imperative morphology.

== Classification ==
Barasana is an aboriginal Amerindian language spoke in the Vaupés region of Colombia in the Amazon Basin. The language belongs to the Tucanoan language family, specifically the Eastern branch. Most closely related to Barasana are Macuna, Kubeo, and Desano, also Eastern Tucanoan languages spoken in Colombia. Barasana and Eduria are considered separate languages by their native speakers, who can intermarry due to cultural differences regardless of the language similarities. It is also typologically classified as an OVS language.

Map displaying the local region in which the native speakers of Barasana can be located. More specifically, along the Vaupés River Basin.

== Geographic distribution ==
Native speakers' tribes are located in Colombia, specifically in the regions of the Vaupés River Basin and the Pira Paraná River. The Vaupés river can be seen in the map. According to a 1993 census, there are approximately 1,900 speakers, which classifies this language as endangered. It is vigorously used in standard form, but is not widespread throughout the region.

=== Dialects/Varieties ===
The Barasana dialect is also known as Southern Barasano, Come Masa, Comematsa, Janera, Paneroa, Yebamasa; Eduria is also known as Edulia, Taibano, Taiwaeno, Taiwano.

== Phonology ==
It has 23 phonemes, consisting of 11 consonants and twelve vowels. A phonological word in Barasano can consist of anywhere from one to nine syllables. Another important aspect of the language is stress and pitch. Many words in the language can be considered either high or low pitch. The Barasano language expresses this importance by way of the phonemics on the word level.

=== Examples ===
Consonants:

- /ta/ --> Grass
- /kahi/ --> Coca
- /rase/ --> Toucan

Vowels:

- /wa/ --> to go
- /oha/ --> to enter woods

=== Vowels ===
Barasano has six vowels: /a, e, i, ɨ, o, u/, with nasal counterparts as /ã, ẽ, ĩ, ɨ̃, õ, ũ/.

=== Consonants ===
		Bilabial	Alveolar	Palatal	Velar	Glottal
Plosive	voiceless	p (Note: /p/ occurs in loanwords from Spanish and other indigenous languages.)	t	c	k	
Plosive	voiced	b	d	ɟ	g	
Fricative			s			h
Approximant				j	w	
Flap			ɾ			

== Grammar ==
=== Mood and modality ===
Barasano has interrogative and imperative markers that take the place of evidential endings found at the end of a verb.

== Syntax ==
=== Word order ===
Barasano uses OV word order in basic declarative clauses. The subject pronoun immediately follows the predicate verb.

== Vocabulary ==
Colors:

- ñĩĩ --> black
- boti --> white
- sũã --> red
- sʉri --> yellow

Body parts:

- hoa --> hair
- kahea --> eyes
- gãmõrõ --> ears
- rise --> mouth
