= Barasano language =

Barasano may be

- Barasana language
- Bará language
