= Macuna =

Tucanoan-speaking group of the eastern Amazon basin

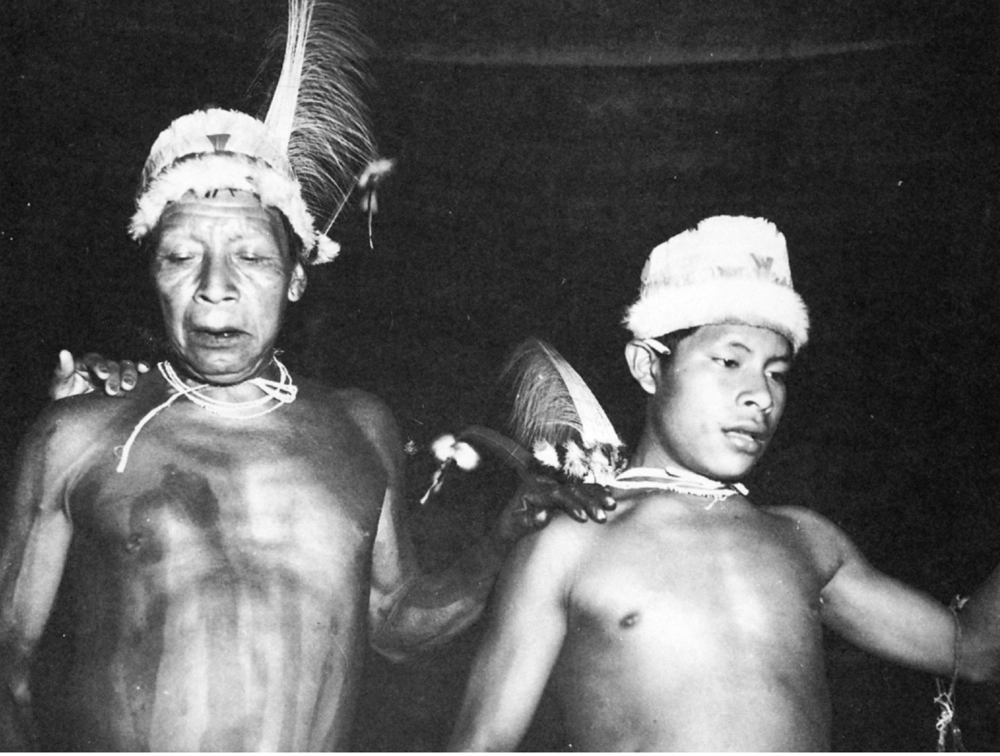
A Makuna shaman and his disciple, dancing around a sick young man, diagnose the cause of the illness with the help of hallucinogenic drugs.

The Macuna (Buhágana) are a Tucanoan-speaking group of the eastern part of the Amazon basin, located around the confluence of the Pira Paraná River and Apaporis river, in the Colombian Vaupés Department and the Brazilian state of Amazonas. There are no reliable census data for the Macuna. The entire population was estimated at some 600 individuals in 1991 (compared with 400 in 1973), of which 450 lived in Colombia.

Except of spoken accounts of a violent past with the southern neighbors, especially the Yauna and Tanimuka Indians, little is known about the early history of the Macuna. Their first mention are in the Portuguese accounts of the 18th century; as the commercial exploitation of rubber began in the Colombian Amazon in the late 19th century, contact with outsiders occurred more frequently, and with a negative effect. Men were taken away with force to work for the rubber patrons, a situation that lasted into the 1940s. The first Catholic mission was established in the area in the 1960s, though intermittent contact with missionaries has existed at least since the 18th century.

The late 1970s and early 1980s brought a new boom into the region, with the growing of coca leaves for illegal trade, which brought substantial quantities of trade goods and money for the indigenous people who working for the White patrons established in the area. By the mid-1980s the production of coca leaves ended as abruptly as it began, but shortly after gold has been discovered along the Taraira River, just a few days away from the Macuna territory. Thousands of White gold miners entered the territory, a majority through Macuna lands, a situation which the Macuna used as a new source of trade goods and money. Additionally, many young men of the group go to the gold fields for a few weeks or months to look for gold on their own or under the temporary employment of a White patron.

Despite this, the Macuna essentially subsist on swidden-cultivation, hunting, fishing, and gathering of forest products. The staple is manioc, but plantains, sweet potatoes, bananas and sugarcane are also cultivated. Meat comes from game such as pacas, tapir, peccaries, large birds, monkeys and caimans. The fur trade, especially the skins of jaguars, ocelots, and otters played an important role in the Macuna economy, until it was prohibited in the 1970s.

In the 1990s the Colombian government created two Indian reservation encompassing most of the Macuna land, which provided them with enhanced control over their territory.
