= Tunía River =

River in Colombia

Tunía River Macayá River

Location
- Country: Colombia

Physical characteristics
- Mouth: Apaporis River
  - location: confluence with Ajajú River, Caquetá, Colombia
  - coordinates: 1°11′05″N 72°43′37″W

Tunía River is a river of Colombia. It is part of the Amazon River basin and one of the sources of Apaporis River.

== See also ==
- List of rivers of Colombia
