= Amazon rubber cycle =

Historical period of Brazil (1879 to 1912)

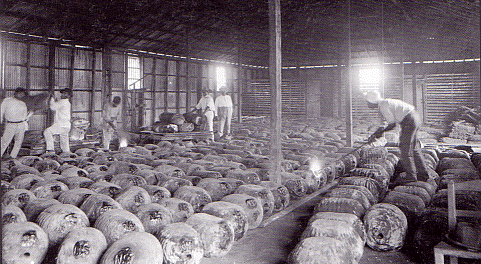
- Rubber bales ready for removal in Cachuela Esperanza, 1914

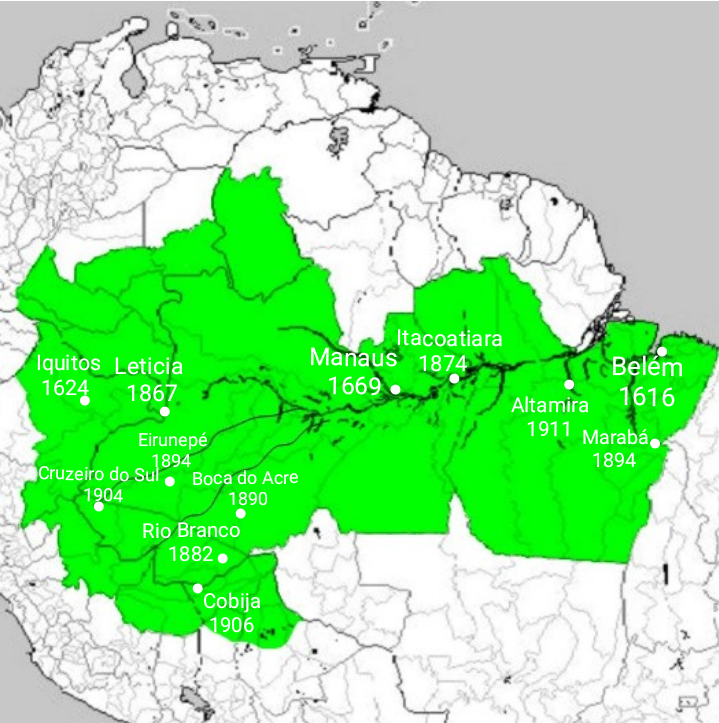
- Map highlighting the main cities where the Amazon rubber boom took place, by year of foundation. Cities in the Colombian Amazonia, Venezuelan Amazonia, Northern Brazil, Bolivian Amazonia and Peruvian Amazonia.
- Native name: Ciclo da Borracha (Portuguese); Fiebre del Caucho (Spanish)
- Date: 1879–1912
- Location: Amazon basin
- Also known as: Amazon rubber boom
- Cause: Increased global demand for rubber

The Amazon rubber cycle or boom (Portuguese: Ciclo da borracha, Brazilian Portuguese: [ˈsiklu da buˈʁaʃɐ]; Spanish: Fiebre del caucho, pronounced [ˈfjeβɾe ðel ˈkawtʃo]) was an important part of the socioeconomic history of Brazil and Amazonian regions of neighboring countries, contributing to the commercialization of rubber and the genocide of region's indigenous peoples.

Centered in the Amazon Basin, the boom resulted in a large expansion of colonization in the area, attracting immigrant workers and causing cultural and social transformations. Crimes against humanity were committed against local indigenous societies, including slavery, rape, torture. The thorough destruction of multiple indigenous cultures has been described as amounting to genocide.

It encouraged the growth of cities such as Manaus and Belém, capitals within the respective Brazilian states of Amazonas and Pará, among many other cities throughout the region like Itacoatiara, Rio Branco, Eirunepé, Marabá, Cruzeiro do Sul and Altamira; as well as the expansion of Iquitos in Peru, Cobija in Bolivia and Leticia in Colombia. The first rubber boom and genocides occurred largely between 1879 and 1912. There was heightened rubber production and associated activities again from 1942 to 1945 during the Second World War.

== Background ==
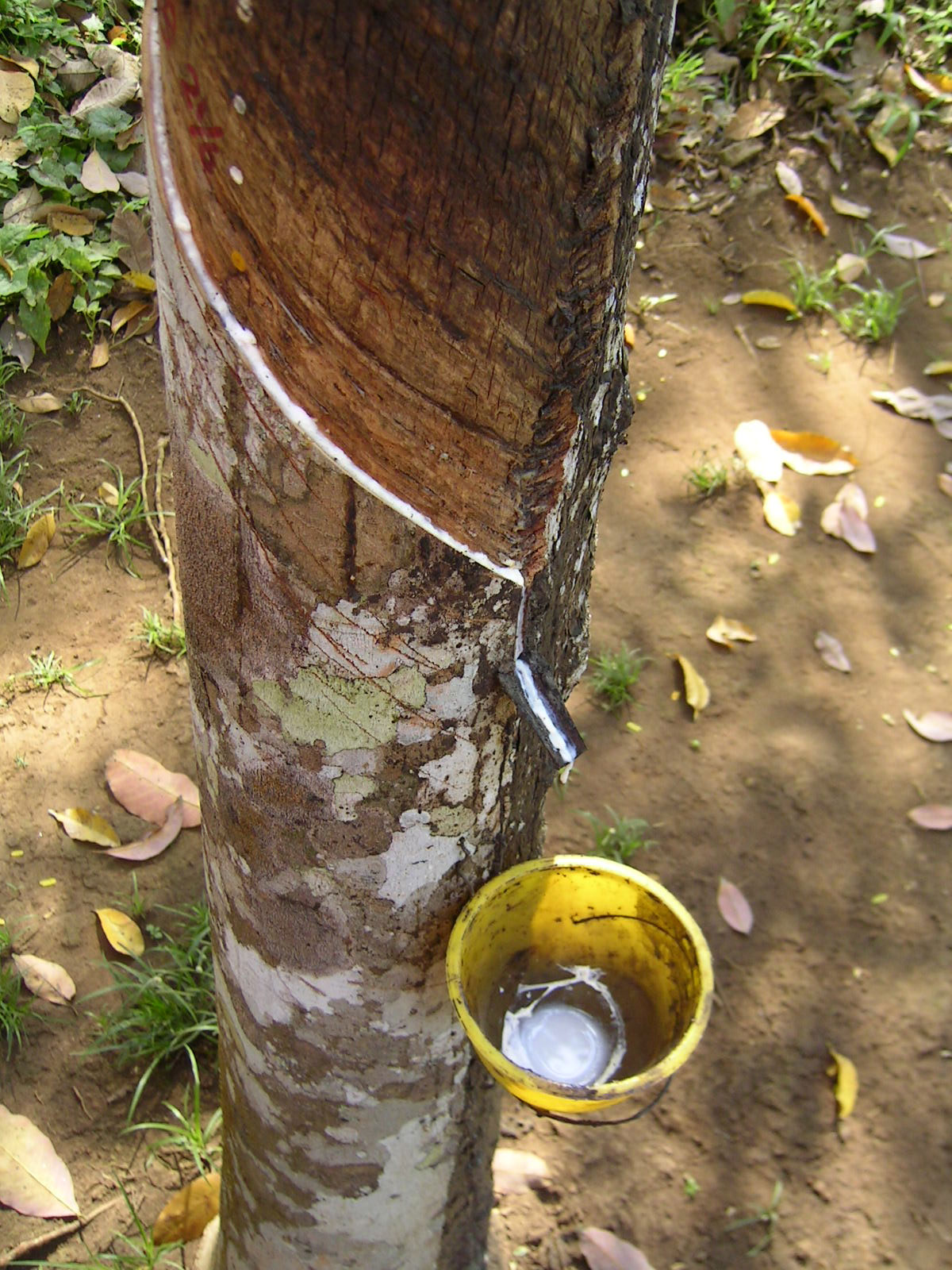
Extraction of latex from a rubber tree

Natural rubber is an elastomer, also known as tree gum, India rubber, and caoutchouc, which comes from the rubber tree in tropical regions. The South American natives first discovered rubber; sometime dating back to 1600 BC. The indigenous people of the Amazon rainforest developed ways to extract rubber from the rubber tree (Hevea brasiliensis), a member of the family Euphorbiaceae. Christopher Columbus was one of the first Europeans to bring news of this odd substance back to Europe, but he was not the only one to report it. Around 1736, a French astronomer recalled how Amerindians used rubber to waterproof shoes and cloaks. He brought several samples of rubber back to France. Rubber was used as an eraser by the British scientist Joseph Priestley, with "rubber" entering English parlance as a substitute for the term "eraser".

A white liquid called latex is extracted from the stem of the rubber tree, and contains rubber particles dispersed in an aqueous serum. The rubber, which constitutes about 35% of the latex, is chemically cis-1,4-polyisoprene ((C_{5}H_{8})_{n}). Latex is practically a neutral substance, with a pH of 7.0 to 7.2 (similar to pure water). However, when it is exposed to the air for 12 — 24 hours, its pH falls and it spontaneously coagulates to form a solid mass of rubber. Rubber produced in this fashion has disadvantages. For example, exposure to air causes it to mix with various materials, which is perceptible and can cause rot, as well as a temperature-dependent stickiness.

It was not until the 1800s that practical uses of rubber were developed and the demand for rubber began. In 1803 rubber factory open in Paris, France which made rubber garters for women. However, the material still had disadvantages: at room temperature, it was sticky. At higher temperatures, the rubber became softer and stickier as well as odorous, while at lower temperatures it became hard and rigid. In 1839, Charles Goodyear discovered a process of vulcanization, and the industrial demand for rubber subsequently became greater. Goodyear's vulcanization method involved mixing rubber with sulphur at high temperatures, resulting in a product that was "radically metamorphosized and could stand extreme extremes of heat or cold without melting or cracking." (Note: The vulcanization process also eliminated the "atrocious odor" of rubber, which in the words of historian John Tully had previously "deterred potential customers from purchasing rubber goods.)

== Effects on indigenous population ==
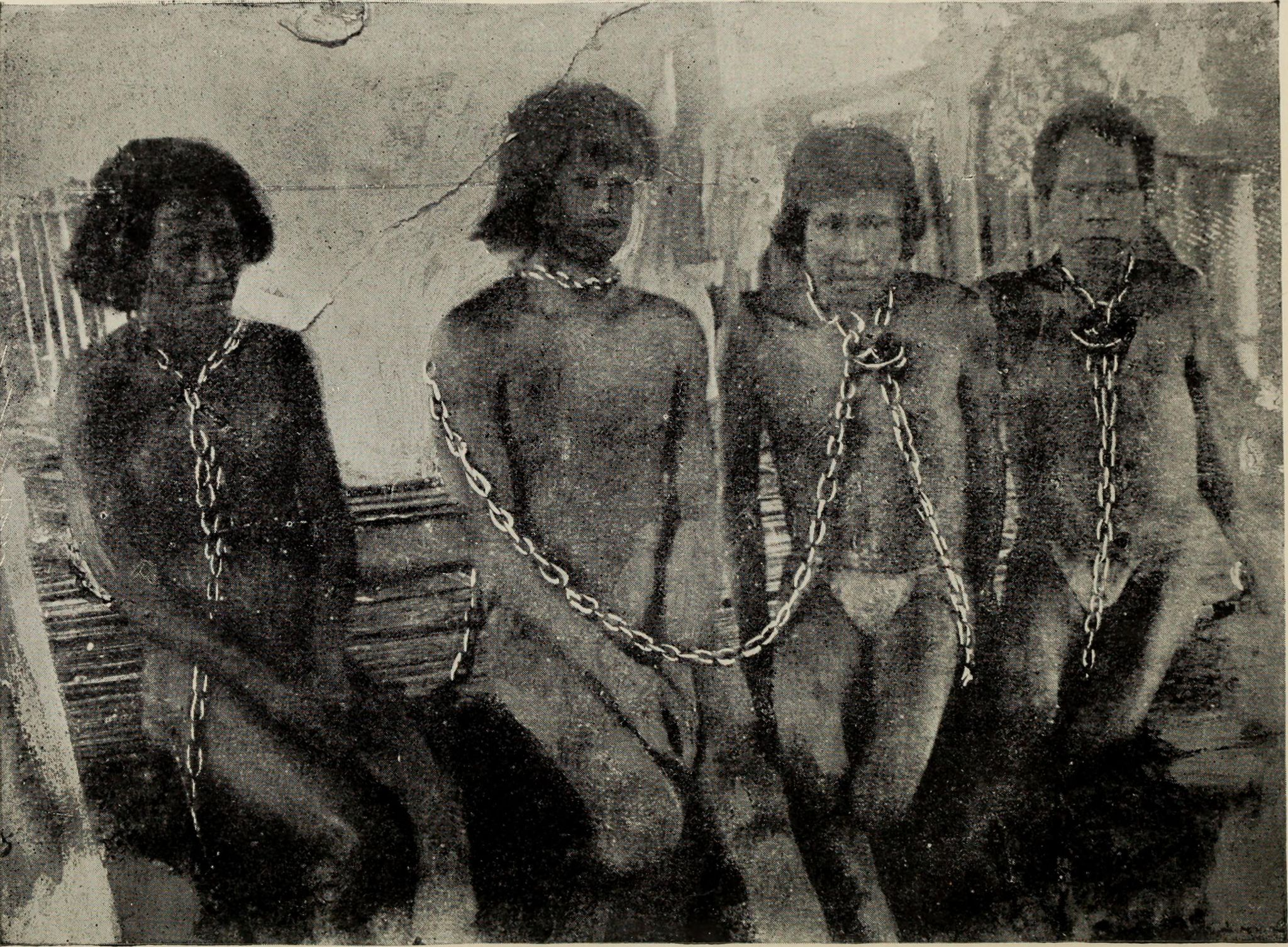
A photo of enslaved Amazon Natives from the 1912 book "The Putumayo, the Devil's Paradise"

The rubber boom and the associated need for a large workforce had a significant negative effect on the indigenous population across Brazil, Bolivia, Venezuela, Peru, Ecuador and Colombia. As rubber plantations grew, labor shortages increased. The owners of the plantations or rubber barons were rich, but those who collected the rubber made very little as a large amount of rubber was needed to be profitable. The rubber barons rounded up all the natives and forced them to tap rubber out of the trees. One plantation started with 50,000 natives but, when discovered, only 8,000 were still alive. Slavery and systematic brutality were widespread, and in some areas, 90% of the native population was wiped out. These rubber plantations were part of the Brazilian rubber market, which declined as rubber plantations in Southeast Asia became more effective.

For indigenous people throughout the tropical world, white sails on the ocean's horizon have often presaged death. For the Indians in the Amazon's green 'ocean' in the late nineteenth and early twentieth centuries, death was heralded by the arrival of steam launches or gunboats bearing armed men hungry for rubber. Technology had moved on from the time of the conquistadors, and killing and slave-driving had become more efficient. Reclusive tribesmen living today in remote corners of the Peruvian selvas inherited the memory of a catastrophe proportional to the genocides of the Final Solution and the Armenian massacres."

— John A. Tully, The Devil’s Milk: A Social History of Rubber

Rubber had catastrophic effects in parts of Upper Amazonia, but its impact should not be exaggerated nor extrapolated to the whole region. The Putumayo genocide was a particularly horrific case. Many nearby rubber regions were not ruled by physical violence, but by the voluntary compliance implicit in patron-peon relations. Some native peoples chose not to participate in the rubber business and stayed away from the main rivers. Because tappers worked in near complete isolation, they were not burdened by overseers and timetables. In Brazil (and probably elsewhere) tappers could, and did, adulterate rubber cargoes, by adding sand and flour to the rubber "balls", before sending them downriver. Flight into the thicket was a successful survival strategy and, because natives were engaged in credit relations, it was a relatively common practice to vanish and work for other patrons, leaving debts unpaid.

=== Peru and the Putumayo genocide ===
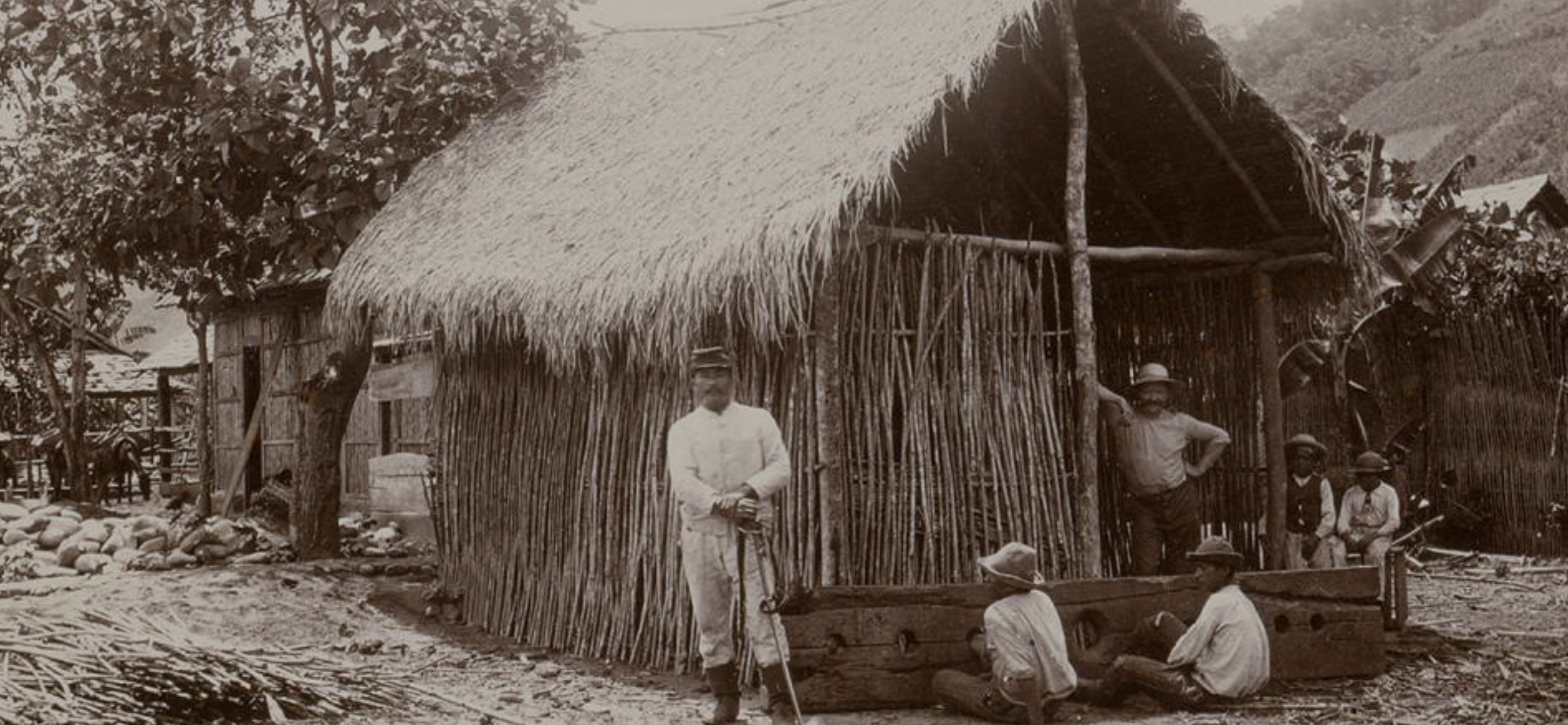
The cepo as photographed by Charles Kroehle in the Peruvian Amazon, circa 1888.

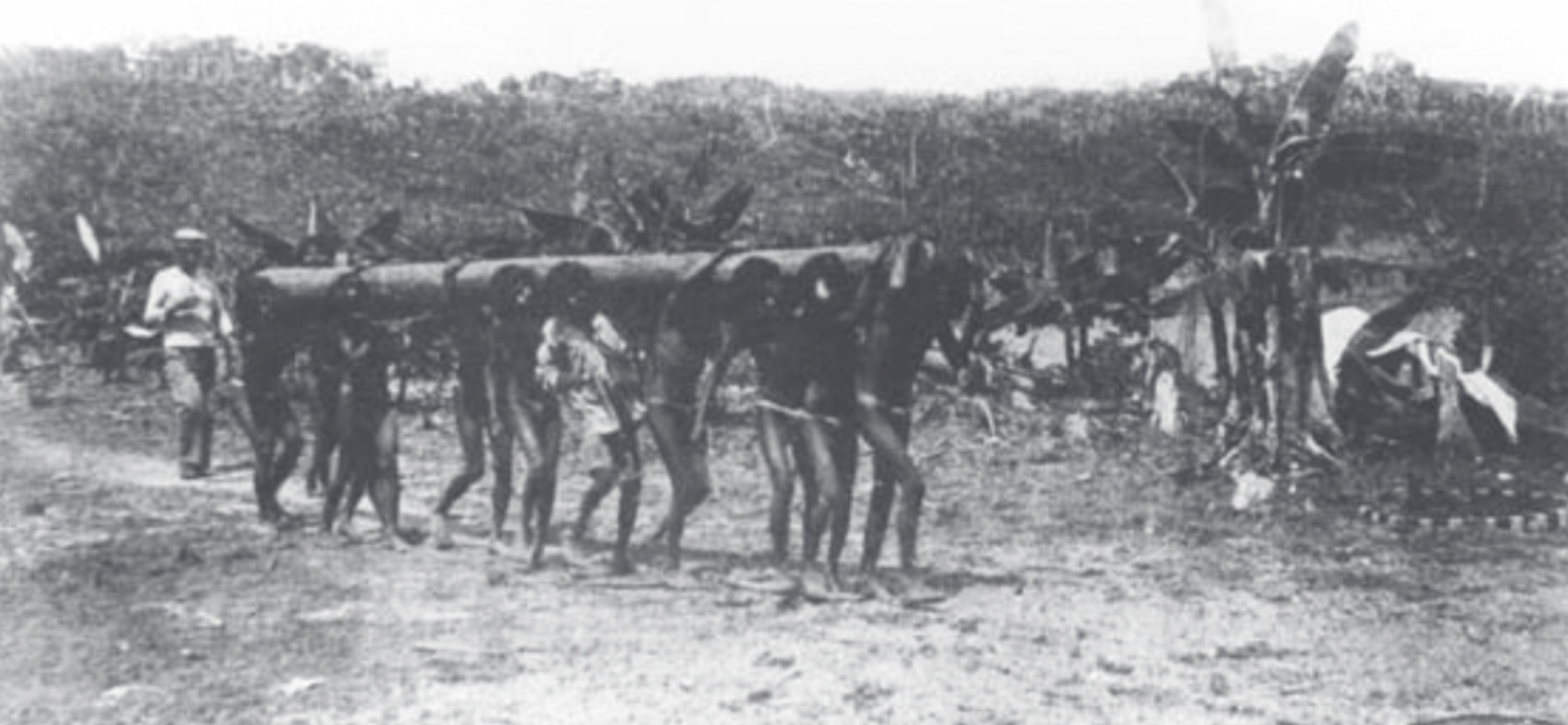
A group of Huitoto natives, forced to work on a plantation belonging to Julio César Arana

Reports of enslavement and barbaric crimes perpetrated by rubber merchants on the Ucayali and Marañón Rivers first came to the attention of the Peruvian government in 1903 and 1906: these crimes were witnessed and reported by Catholic missionaries as well as several men employed by the Peruvian government. (Note: This refers to the Peruvian engineers Jorge Von Hassel and César Cipriani, as well as Hildebrando Fuentes, Prefect of Loreto between 1904-1906 and Bentio Lores, a subprefect of Loreto in 1903.) While writing in 1907, Charles R. Enock claimed that the Peruvian Government had, for a long time, been aware of the brutal exploitation of indigenous people by rubber merchants and collectors. Several government reports and articles written on this subject, both by travelers and government officials, were published prior to 1908. Enock stated that since the beginning of rubber exploitation in the Peruvian Amazon, authorities were aware of the sale of indigenous people in Iquitos and else where, as well as the constant trafficking of indigenous women. Hildebrando Fuentes, the prefect of Loreto between 1904 and 1906, described the practice of Correrias, or slave raids in a report to his government. Fuentes noted that many of the indigenous people in Peru were being killed during these correrias and in writing he referred to these raids as "the great crime of the mountain". These raids also managed to capture many indigenous people, which were then trafficked to Iquitos or nearby rubber camps. According to Fuentes, indigenous people were being sold at Iquitos for prices ranging between £30-£50 and the majority of the indigenous population in Iquitos consisted of people captured during the correrias.

Anthropologist Søren Hvalkof stated that the correrias after native peoples were common in all areas of the Ucayali River and affected all of the indigenous groups in that area. The displacement and decimation of Conibo and Yine natives on the Ucayali and Urubamba River eventually led to the Asháninka demographic becoming the largest indigenous group in that region. Some native groups agreed to accept "advances" of supplies that rubber firms offered, in exchange these natives would extract rubber for the firms, and in this way many natives became indebted to these firms. In other cases indigenous groups were obliged through violence and or coercion to accept these "advances" of goods, therein becoming indebted. Natives along the Ucayali and Urubamba that did not agree to extract rubber were often targeted by slave raids. By 1891, most of the Piro natives along the Urubamba River were indebted to the Peruvian rubber baron Carlos Fitzcarrald.

The work force in the form of slaves had at this time been converted into a commodity as part of the economy of the region. The correrías after indigenous slaves were common in all parts and involved all of the indigenous groups of the Ucayali. With the booming economy of rubber extraction, in 1880 human exploitation and perversion reached new heights.

— Søren Hvalkof, Liberation Through Land Rights in the Peruvian Amazon

Slave raids into the Peruvian side of the Madre de Dios River and its tributary the Manú River began around 1894. This was largely due to the development of the Isthmus of Fitzcarrald. Hundreds of natives from the Toyeri and Araseri ethnic groups were massacred around that time because they would either not allow the rubber patrons to pass through their lands, or they would not agree to extract rubber for these patrons. Most of the Mashco-Piro demographic was slaughtered in 1894. Some of the surviving Mashco-Piro, Toyeri and Araseri natives were pressured into fleeing from their ancestral territory. An unknown number of their villages were destroyed and this region was never subjected to a systematic inquiry or investigation so the full extent of the devastation caused by the rubber boom in this area may never be known.

"Correrías" are rapid slave raids which became institutionalised during the rubber boom around the turn of the century, to obtain labourers for the rubber extraction. A patron would give a small group of slave hunters Winchester rifles, which were in great demand, in return for which Ashéninka settlements were attacked and all individuals potentially capable of working taken captive, that is, preferably children and young women, who were taken to the patron as his personal property. Adult men were more difficult to control and thus they were preferably killed, to avoid witnesses and possible reprisals. These parties frequently consisted of Indians, who had long been subjugated by the patron through debt bondage. The Ashéninka, Yíne and Conibo were all active in these correrías. But colonists also participated as leaders of raiding parties.

— Søren Hvalkof, Liberation Through Land Rights in the Peruvian Amazon

Anthropologist Stefano Varese noted that the Peruvian rubber patrons employed two labor systems, one of these systems was referred to as enganche [por deudas], or hooking by debt. Enganche was typically employed with Mestizo workers, Varese wrote that the debt was "an eternal debt that the worker would never be able to repay." The second system of labor was used against indigenous people and entailed "simply enslaving" a large number of young indigenous men and women and then relocating them from their homeland. One of the intentions of this forced relocation was to cultivate submission in the enslaved indigenous population. In certain areas of the Peruvian Amazon, correrías primarily captured women and children while men were eliminated. Jorge Von Hassel wrote that this was because: "they would never form as malleable a workforce as the children, who were more easily and fully assimilated". Elderly indigenous individuals were typically killed because they were unable to easily adapt to the new circumstances brought on by forced migrations and therefore they were viewed as disruptive elements. In 1905, Hassel wrote in an official report to the Peruvian government that the industry of collecting "‘black gold,’ as the rubber is termed" had produced "[m]arked changes" among the indigenous tribes of the Peruvian Amazon. "Some of them have accepted the ‘civilisation’ offered by the rubber-merchants, others have been annihilated by them. On the other hand, alcohol, rifle bullets, and smallpox have worked havoc among them in a few years."

One of the most atrocious cases of abuses during the first rubber boom, culminated in the Putumayo genocide. From the 1870s until the mid-1910s Colombians and Peruvians enslaved and exploited the indigenous population of the Putumayo River. During the rubber boom, the border of Colombia and Peru was located along the Putumayo River. Between the Andoques, Boras, and Huitoto populations over 40,000+ natives were wiped out for rubber profits. Slave raids were a common practice where many were killed or captured. Many of the natives died from starvation, which was used as a punishment against them at times. The worst perpetrators of this genocide include the rubber baron Julio César Arana and the staff of his Peruvian Amazon Company. By 1908, Arana and his staff were effectively the controllers of a significant portion of the Putumayo River basin, maintaining around 40 estates there which were dedicated to rubber extraction. The managers of these estates imposed a quota onto the natives: and failing to meet that quota could have resulted in flagellation, dismemberment, or execution on the spot.

Roger Casement, an Irishman traveling the Putumayo region of Peru as a British consul from 1910 to 1911, documented the abuse, slavery, murder and use of stocks for torture against the natives. The Peruvian judge Romulo Paredes and Casement both acknowledged the targeting of the indigenous elderly population by Arana's employees. Casement was under the impression that this was largely due to the potential that those elders were capable of giving "bad advice. Bad advice means not to work rubber. Thus the old folks are always first singled out." Paredes noted the attitude of Arana's employees against the local indigenous elders, who were regarded as incapable of extracting rubber. "Hence, considering the elderly not only useless but dangerous, they were exterminated to the point of not leaving a single one in the vast and populous region of Putumayo." Even though 237 arrest warrants were issued for employees of the company, very few faced any justice for their crimes. In 1911, some of the most infamous staff members of Arana's company, including Victor Macedo, Augusto Jiménez, Abelardo Agüero and Fidel Velarde, fled the Putumayo River basin and continued working in the rubber industry as late as 1914.

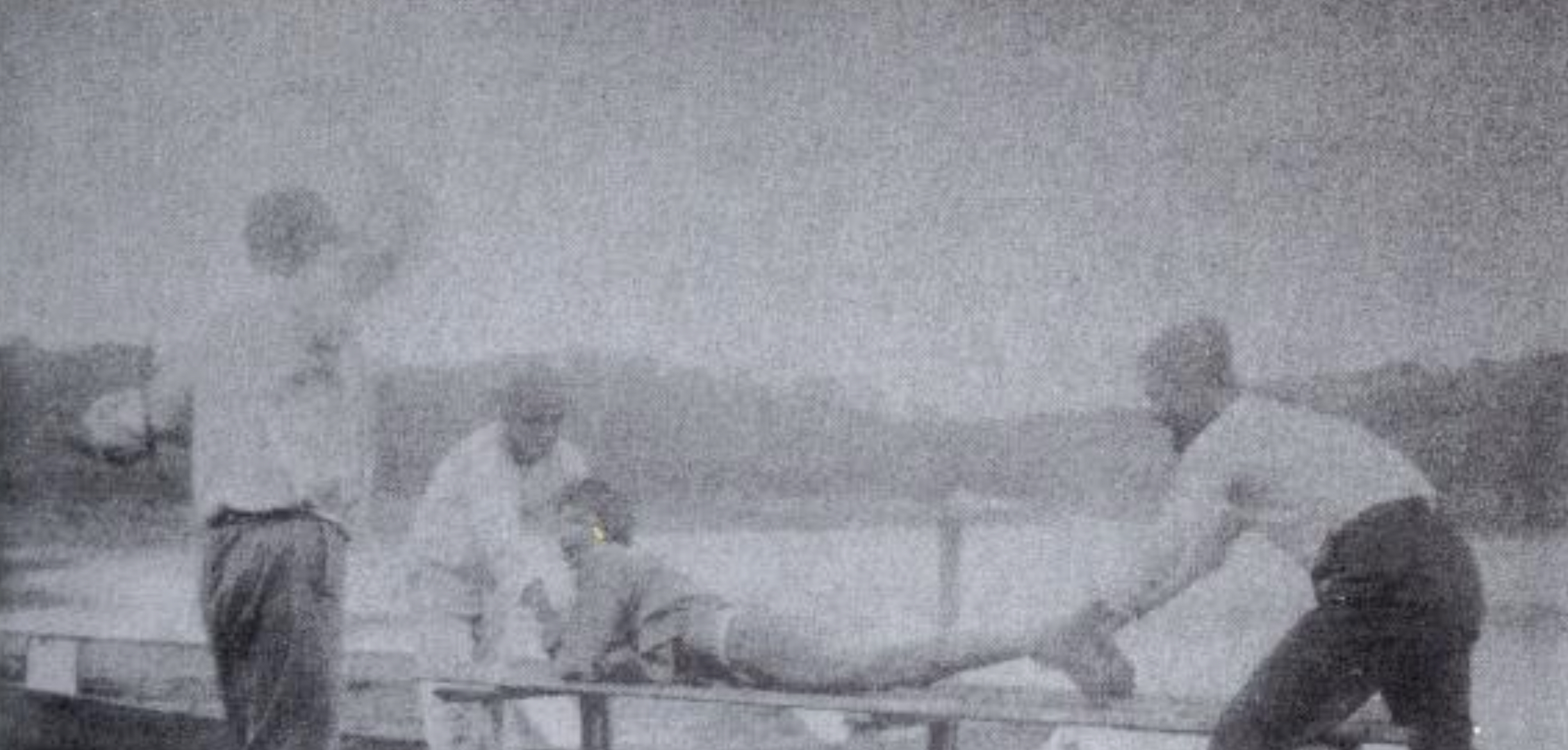
Flogging of a Putumayo native, carried out by the employees of Julio César Arana

According to Wade Davis, author of One River:

The horrendous atrocities that were unleashed on the Indian people of the Amazon during the height of the rubber boom were like nothing that had been seen since the first days of the Spanish Conquest.

=== Colombia ===
During the first rubber boom in Colombia, natives from the Cofán, Siona, Oyo, Coreguaje, Macaguaje, Kichwa, Teteté, Huitoto, and other nations were indebted and exploited as a work force by various patrons. The Caqueta, Putumayo, Napo and Vaupés Rivers were active areas of rubber extraction during this time period. On 23 April 2024, the Government of Colombia issued a formal apology to the indigenous communities of the Amazon basin for allowing the forced enslavement and systematic brutality they endured during the rubber booms of the 19th and 20th centuries which, in the Amazon region of Colombia, resulted in the death of about 60,000 indigenous people.

=== Bolivia ===
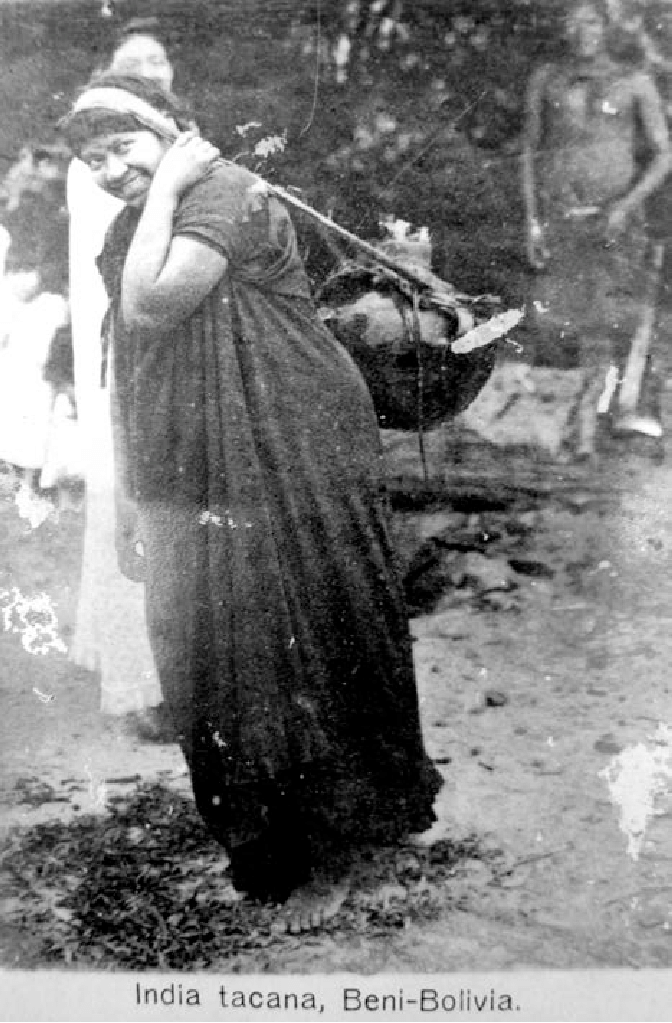
Indigenous Tacana woman carrying a weight load on her back. Beni, Bolivia

Anthropologist Klaus Rummenhoeller describes widespread prosecution of Bolivian natives, as the result of Nicolás Suarez's company around 1902. The region was scoured for labor from multiple slave raids. The raids resulted in the destruction of homes, the capture of men, women, as well as the killing of children and the elderly. British minister Cecil Gosling stayed in the Suárez estates for five months, and referred to the labor system as "undisguised slavery." In response to the slavery allegations in the Beni region, a U.S. minister said they were harsh but the scarcity of labor in the region made it less so than in the Putumayo. Many indigenous groups in Bolivia interned themselves into the jungle, abandoning their land and agriculture in the hopes of escaping the slavers. Many natives from the Beni, Madeira, and Mamoré regions were enslaved, so that they could work collecting rubber, or transportation along the rivers. Some of the exploited groups include: Mojos, Tacana, Araona, Harakmbut, Mashcho-Piro, and Cashinahua.

Pando is Bolivia's only department fully covered by the Amazon vegetation.

=== Venezuela ===
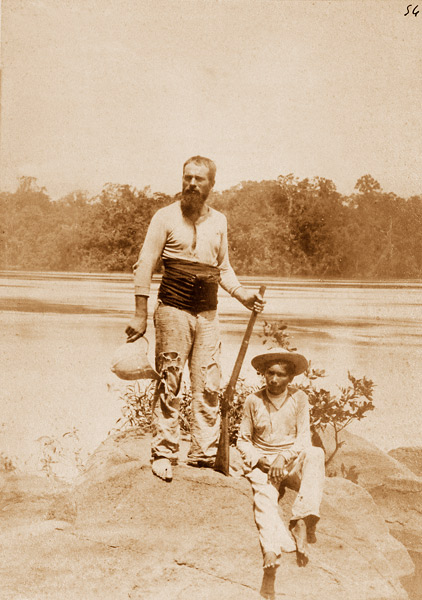
Photograph taken on the Orinoco river between 1884 and 1890

The worst abuses against the indigenous populations of Venezuela during the rubber boom occurred under Tomás Funes and began in 1913, shortly after a massacre organized by Funes which became known as the Night of the Machetes. Over the next nine years, Tomás Funes and his armed gang destroyed dozens of Ye'kuana villages, and killed thousands of Ye'kuana natives. Other villages were either resettled, or fragmented.

== First rubber boom, 1879–1912 ==
For the first four and a half centuries following the discovery of the New World, the native populations of the Amazon Basin lived practically in isolation. The area was vast and impenetrable, no gold or precious stones had been found there, as neither colonial Brazil nor imperial Brazil was able to create incentives for development in the region. The regional economy was based on use of diverse natural resources in the region, but development was concentrated in coastal areas.

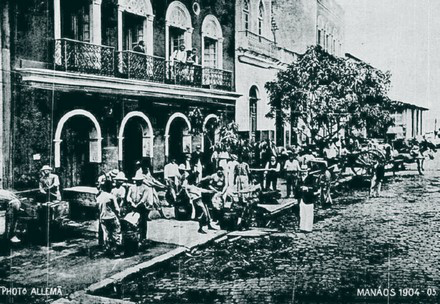
Commercial center of Manaus in 1904.

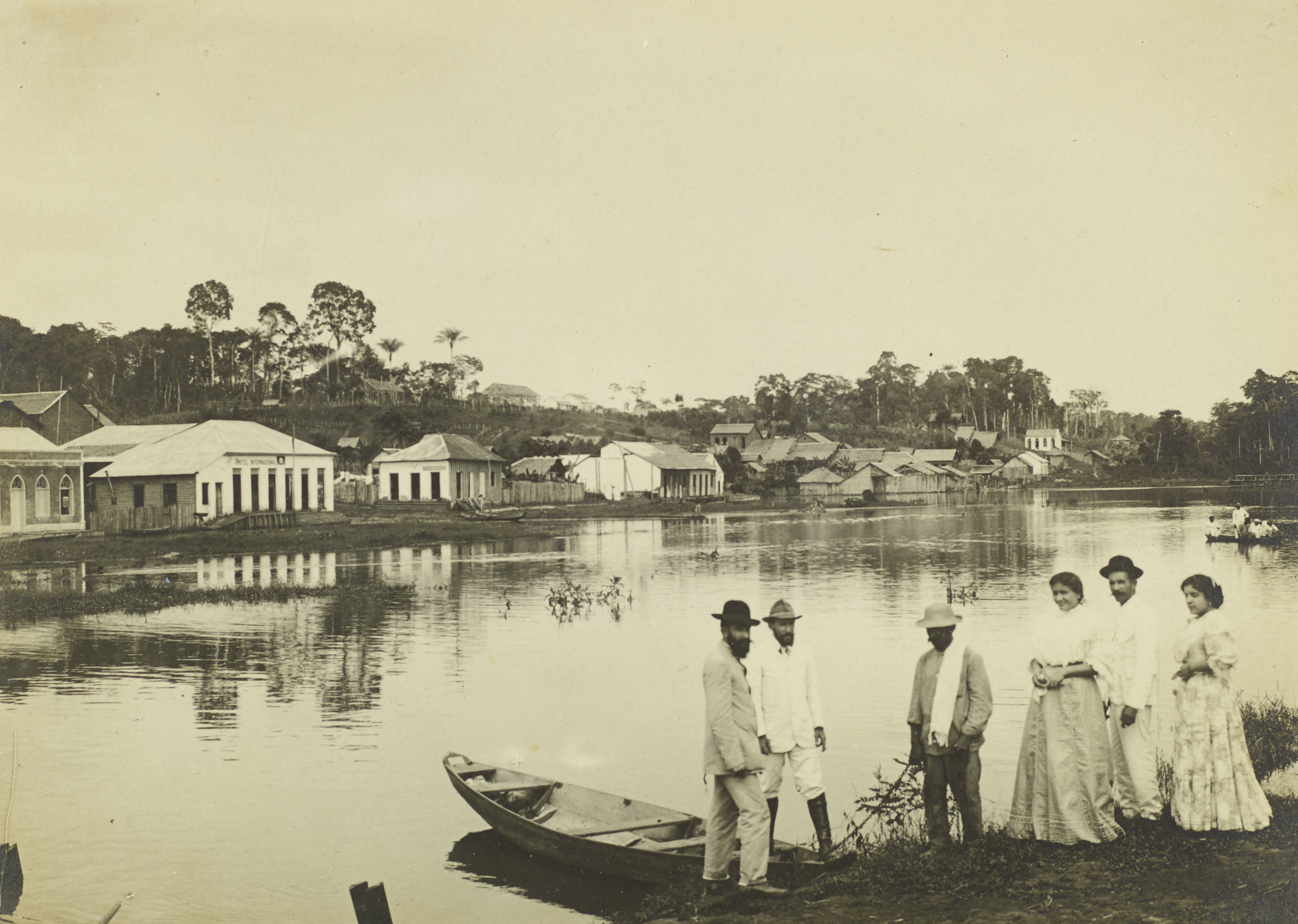
Commercial area of Cruzeiro do Sul, Acre, 1906.

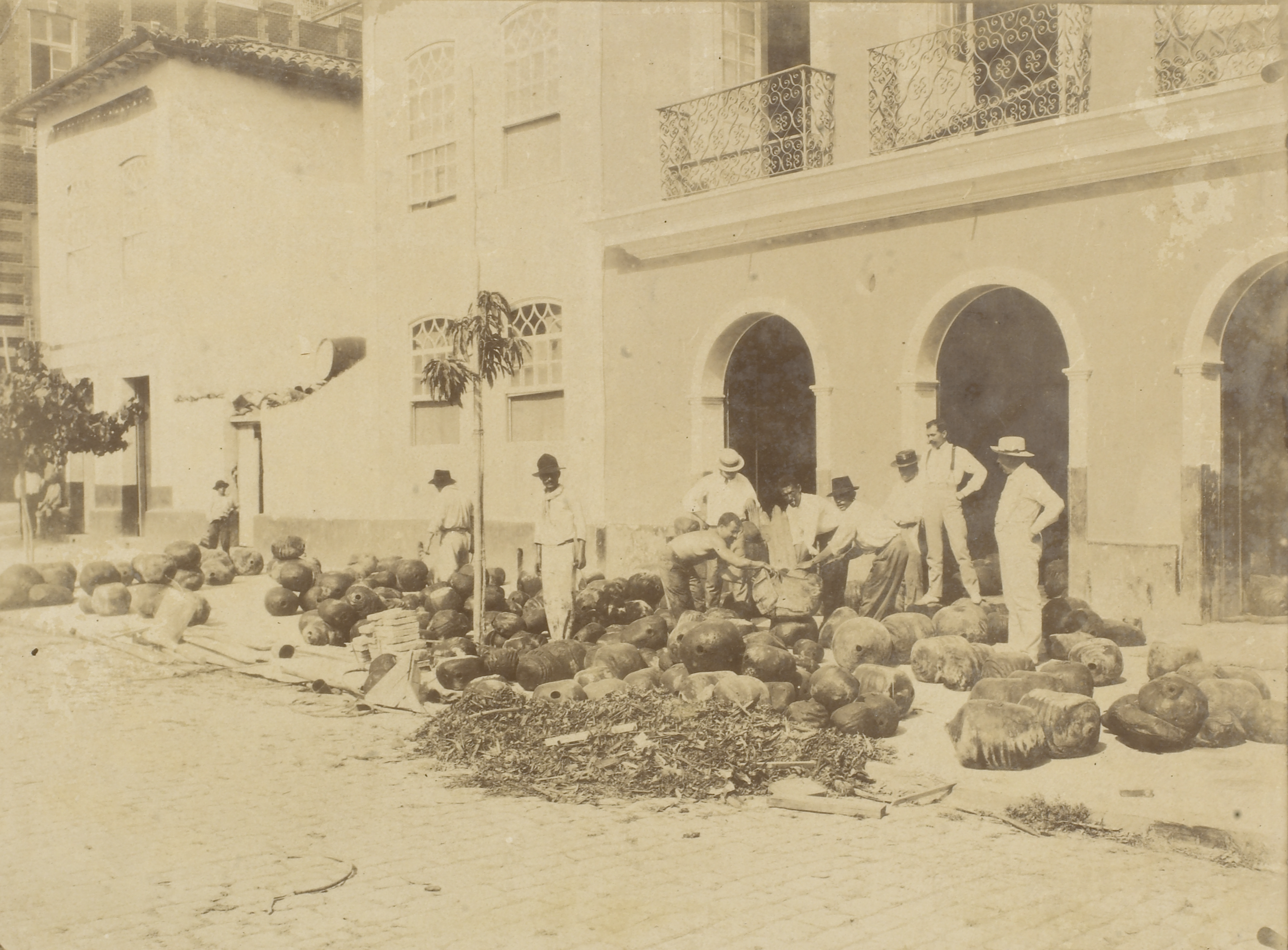
Processing of rubber, Manaus, 1906.

=== Rubber: sure wealth ===
The Industrial Revolution in Europe led to demand for uses that natural rubber could satisfy. At that time, it was exclusively found in the Amazon Basin. It was a desirable commodity, valued at a high price, and thought to create wealth and dividends for whoever would dare invest in the trade.

From the beginning of the second half of the 19th century, rubber began to exert a strong attraction to visionary entrepreneurs. The activity of latex extraction in the Amazon revealed its lucrative possibilities. Natural rubber soon achieved a place of distinction in the industries of Europe and North America, reaching a high price. This caused various people to travel to Brazil with the intention of learning more about the rubber tree and the process of latex extraction, from which they hoped to make their fortunes.

Because of the growth of rubber extraction, industrial processing and related activities, numerous cities and towns swelled on waves of immigrants. In 1855, over 2,100 tons of rubber was exported from the Amazon; a figure which reached 10,000 tons by 1879. Belém and Manaus were transformed and urbanized. Manaus was the first Brazilian city to be urbanized and the second to be electrified (the first was Campos dos Goytacazes, in Rio de Janeiro).

=== Acre question ===
The territory of Acre state in modern Brazil

The increase in uncontrolled extraction of rubber was increasing tensions and close to provoking an international conflict. The Brazilian workers advanced further and further into the forests in the territory of Bolivia in search of new rubber trees for extraction, creating conflicts and skirmishes on the frontier towards the end of the 19th century. The Brazilian Army, led by José Plácido de Castro, was sent into the area to protect Brazilian resources. The newly proclaimed Brazilian republic was drawing a considerable profit from the lucrative rubber trade, but the "Acre question" (as the border conflicts caused by rubber extraction became known) preoccupied it.

Intervention by the diplomat Barão do Rio Branco and the ambassador Joaquim Francisco de Assis Brasil, in part financed by the "rubber barons," led to negotiations with Bolivia and the signing of the Treaty of Petropolis, signed November 17, 1903, during the government of president Rodrigues Alves. While it halted conflict with Bolivia, the treaty guaranteed effective control by Brazil of the forests of Acre.

Brazil was given possession of the region by Bolivia in exchange for territories in Mato Grosso, a payment of two million pounds sterling, and the compromise of constructing the railroad to connect to the Madeira River. This would enable Bolivia to transport its goods, primarily rubber, to the Brazilian ports of the Atlantic at the mouth of the Amazon River. Initially Belém in Pará was designated as the destination.

Because of the peaceful resolution of this issue, the capital of Acre was named Rio Branco after the Brazilian diplomat. Two of the municipalities in the state were named Assis Brasil and Plácido de Castro, after the ambassador and another key figure.

=== The Brazilian Apogee, elegance, and luxury ===
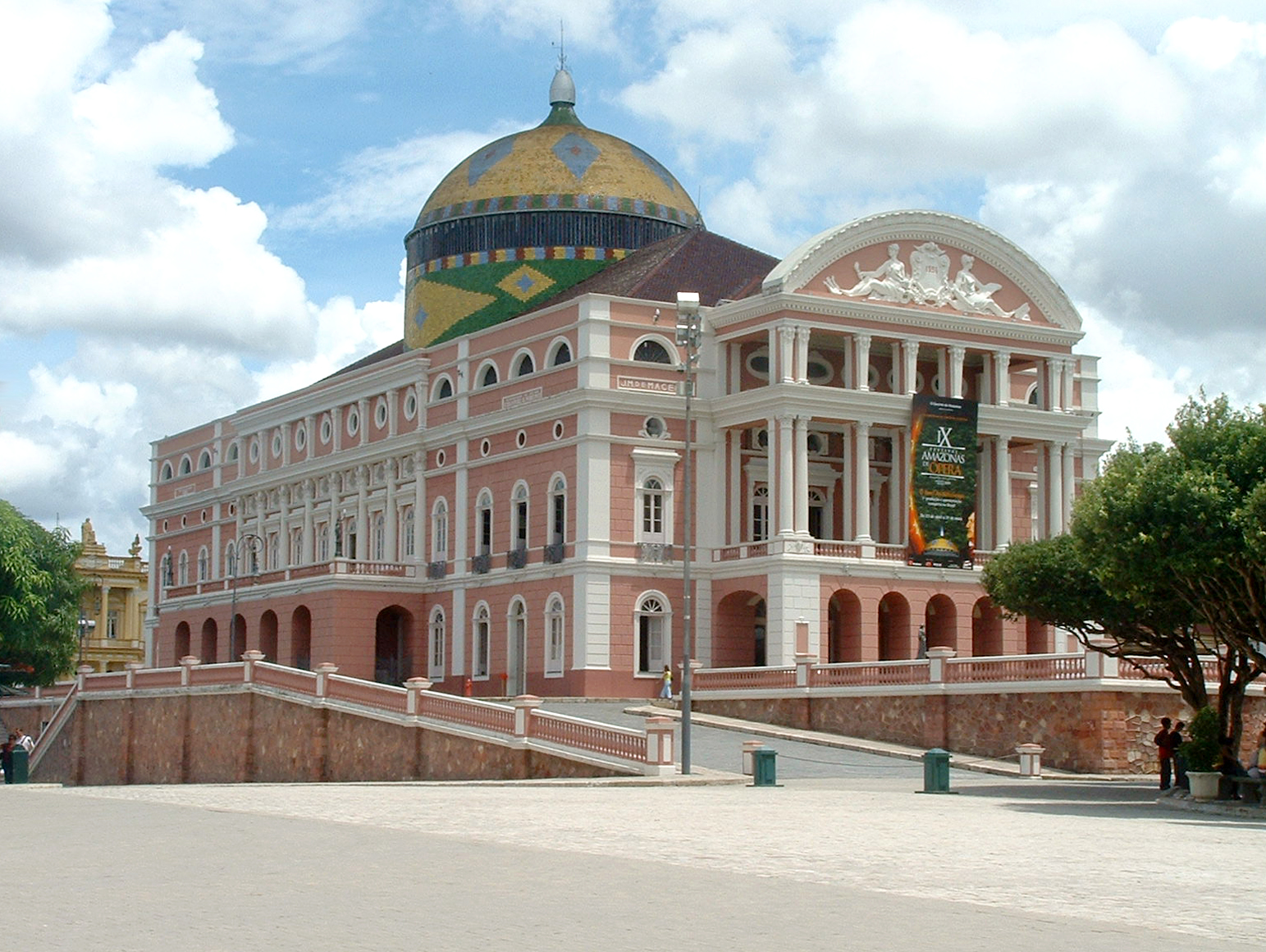
The Amazon Theatre in Manaus, one of the luxurious buildings built with rubber fortunes

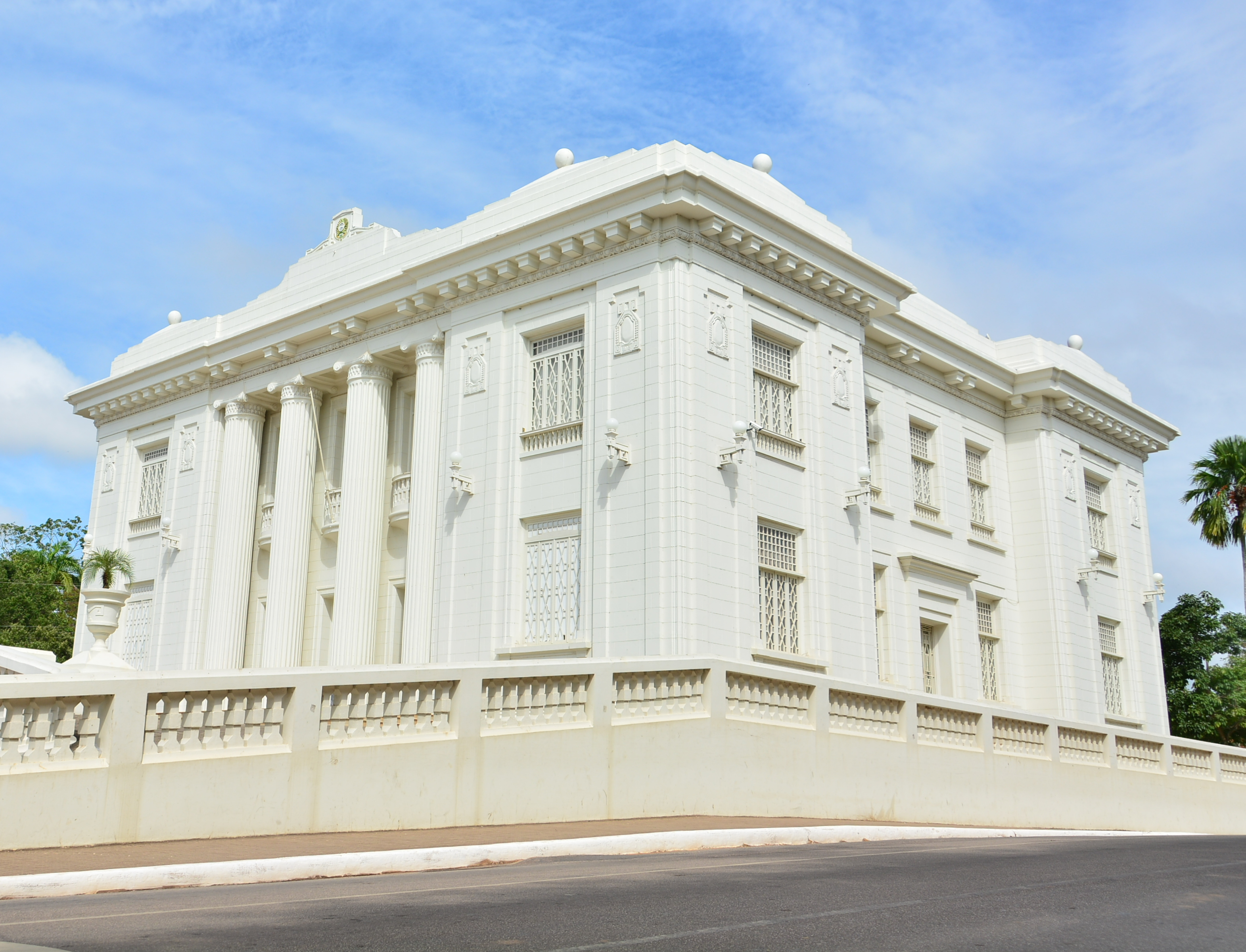
The Palácio Rio Branco in Rio Branco, was built with rubber fortunes

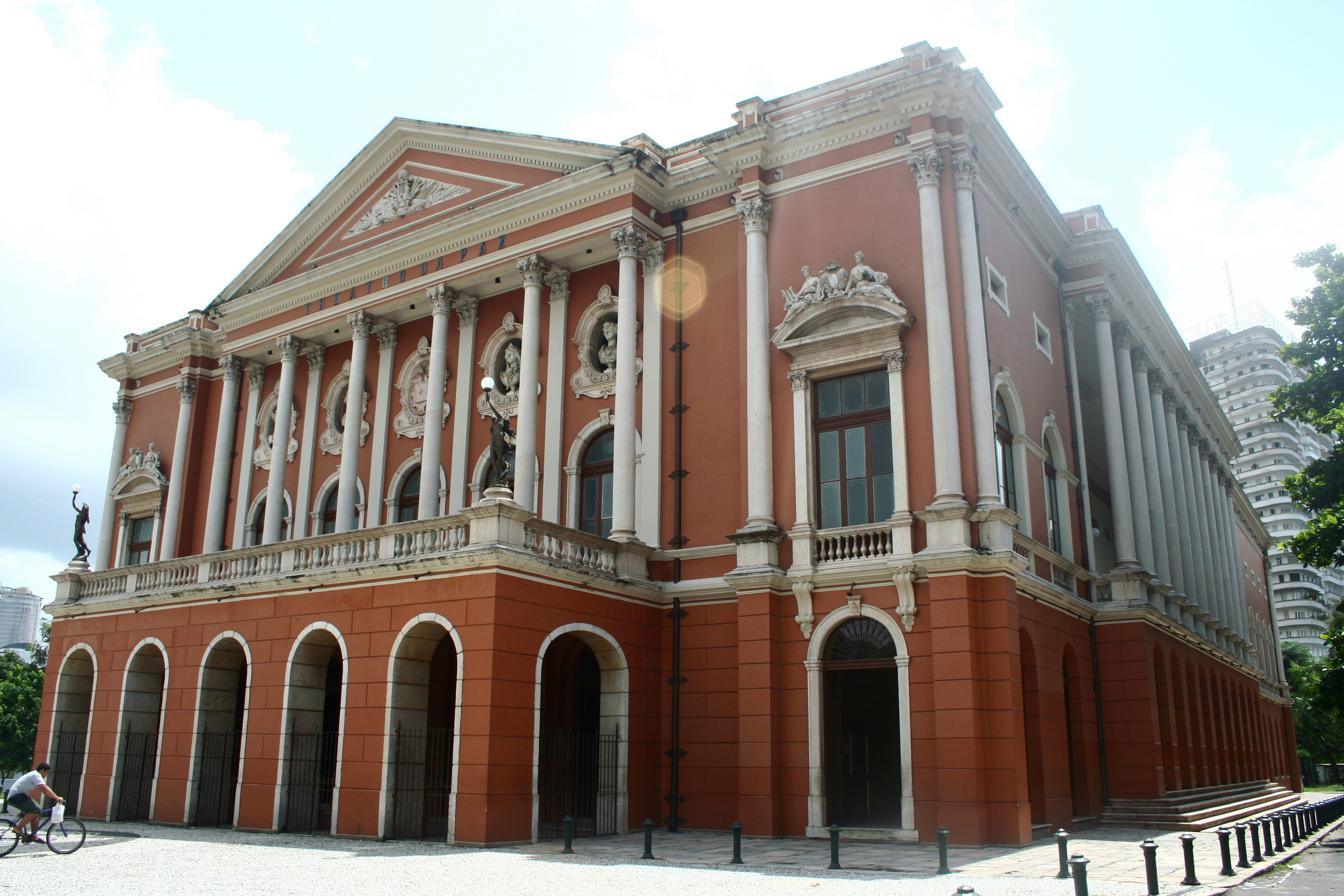
The Theatro da Paz, in Belém, was built with rubber fortunes

Belém, the capital of Pará state, as well as Manaus, the capital of Amazonas, were the most developed and prosperous cities in Brazil during the rubber boom. They were located in strategic sites, and prominent men in the rubber industry built their numerous and wealthy residences in each. These citizens created the demand that led to both cities being electrified and given running water and sewers.

Their apogee was reached between 1890 and 1920, when they acquired electric trams, avenues built on cleared gullies, as well as imposing and luxurious buildings, such as the polished Teatro Amazonas, the government palace, the municipal market, and the customs house, in the case of Manaus; and the fish market, the iron market, Teatro da Paz, corridors of mango trees, and various residential palaces in the case of Belém, constructed in large part by the intendant Antônio Lemos. These technologies and construction did not take place anywhere else in south and southeast Brazil of the time.

The European influence later became notable in Manaus and Belém, in the architecture and culture; and the two cities enjoyed their greatest economies and influence in the 19th century. The Amazon Basin was the source in the era for nearly 40% of all Brazil's exports. The new riches of Manaus made the city the world capital in the sale of diamonds. Thanks to rubber, the per capita income of Manaus was twice as much as the coffee-producing region (São Paulo, Rio de Janeiro and Espírito Santo).

As payment for the export of rubber, the workers were paid in pounds sterling (£), the currency of the United Kingdom, which circulated in Manaus and Belém during this period.

=== Madeira–Mamoré Railroad ===
Developers in Bolivia in 1846 began to promote the idea of constructing a railroad along the Madeira and Mamoré Rivers, to reach ports on the Atlantic Ocean for its export products. It has never reached the coast.

Rivers had long been the key to navigation and travel through the Amazon Basin. An initial proposal was based on travel up the Mamoré in Bolivia and down the Madeira River in Brazil. However, the river course had substantial obstacles to industrial-level transport: twenty cataracts obstructed navigation. Constructing a railroad to bypass the problematic stretches of the rivers was the only solution.

In 1867, in Brazil, also trying to develop a simple way to transport the rubber, the engineers José and Francisco Keller organized a large expedition. They explored the rubber region of the Madeira River to find the most productive region and the most effective course for the railroad.

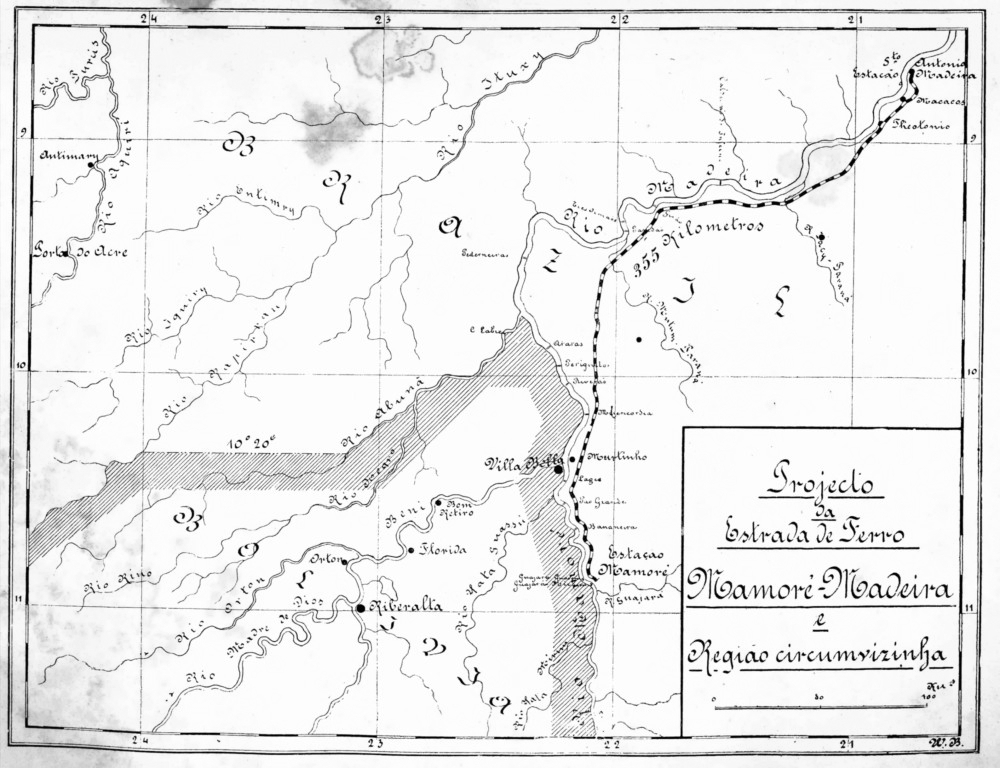
The rubber boom justified the construction of the Madeira Mamoré Railroad

Although the idea of river navigation was complicated, in 1869, the North American engineer George Earl Church obtained from the Bolivian government a concession to create and explore a navigation enterprise that linked the Mamoré and Madeira Rivers. Shortly afterwards, he realized the real difficulty of this undertaking. He changed the plans to construction of a railroad. Negotiations advanced and, by 1870, Church received permission from the Brazilian government to build a railroad along the rubber territories of the Madeira River.

The Madeira–Mamoré Railroad became known as the "Devil's Railroad", on account of having caused the death of around six thousand workers (in legends said to be one dead worker per railroad tie attached to the rails), was constructed by the United States corporation of Percival Farquhar. The construction of the railroad began in 1907 during the government of Afonso Pena and was one of the most significant episodes in the history of the occupation of the Amazon, revealing the clear attempt to integrate it into the global marketplace via the commercialization of rubber.

On April 30, 1912, the final stretch of the Madeira–Mamoré Railroad was belatedly completed. The occasion was commemorated by the arrival of the first train to the city of Guajará-Mirim, founded on that same day.

First, the price of latex fell precipitously in the world market, making the trade of rubber from the Amazon unviable. Also, the transport of products that could have been transported by the Madeira–Mamoré Railroad were taken by two other railroads, one in Chile and the other in Argentina, and the Panama Canal, which became active on August 15, 1914.

Added to this, the natural factor, the Amazon forest, with its high level of rainfall and rapid growth, destroyed entire stretches of the rails, leveled ground, and bridges, reclaiming a large part of the way that people had insisted on clearing to construct the railroad.

The railroad was partially taken out of service in the 1930s and completely in 1972. That year the Trans-Amazonian highway (BR-230) opened. Today, from a total of 364 km of length of railway, about seven remain in active use, used for tourist purposes. The people of Rondonia have fought for revitalization of the railroad, but as of December 1, 2006, the work remains unstarted.

=== End of the Amazon's rubber monopoly ===
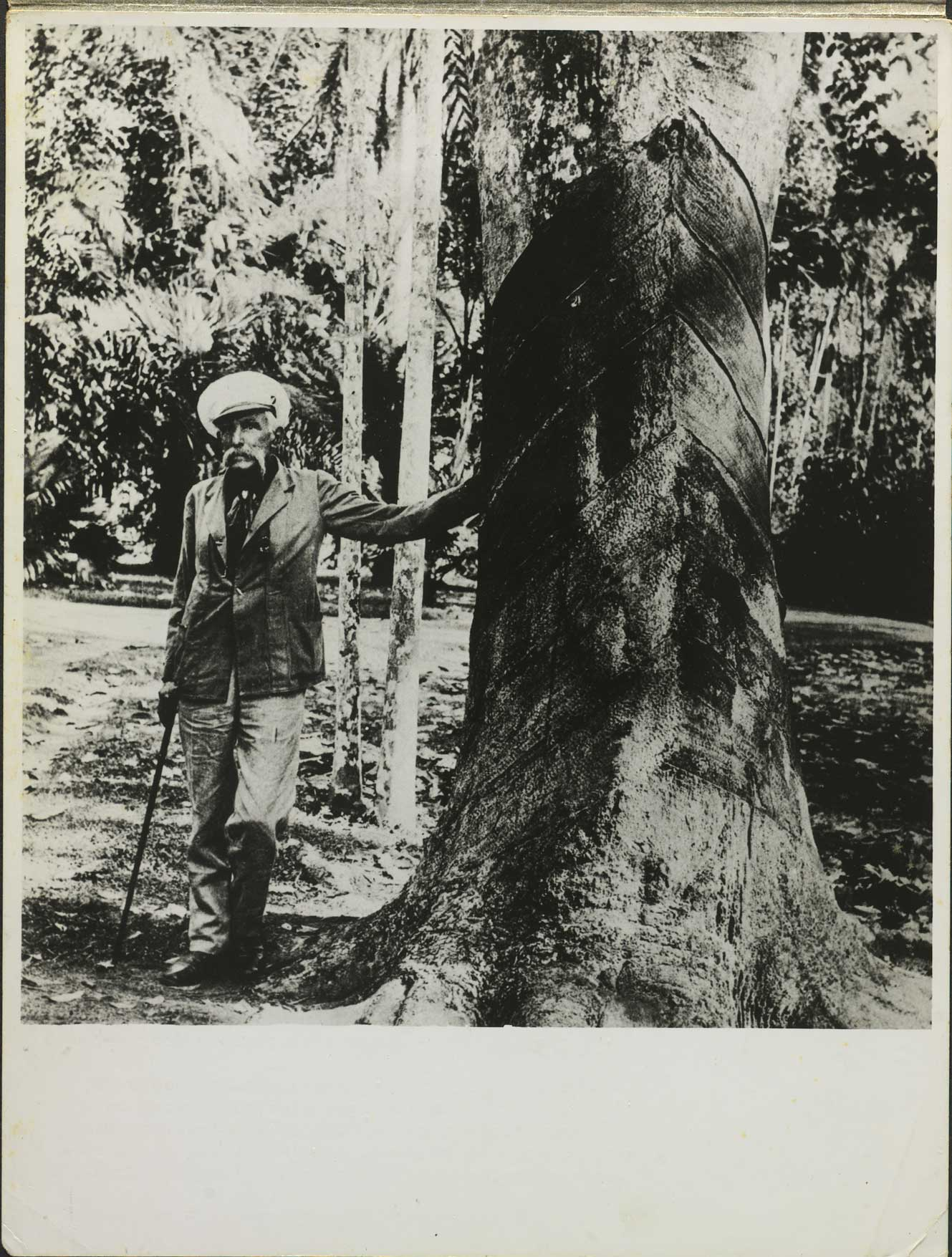
"Henry Wickham, who in 1876 directed an operation smuggling 70,000 rubber tree seeds"

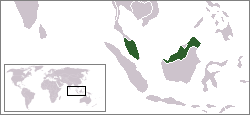
Malaysia, which invested in the planting of rubber trees and in latex extraction technology, was the principal cause of the loss of the Brazilian monopoly

The Madeira–Mamoré Railroad, finished in 1912, arrived too late. The train was no longer profitable after the price of rubber fell. The Amazon was already losing primacy in rubber production, as the British government had planted rubber trees in its colonies in Malaysia, Sri Lanka, and tropical Africa. These rubber trees were planted from seeds that Henry Wickham had smuggled out of Brazil in 1876. In 1899 it was estimated by John Ferguson that there were between 1,500 and 1,600 acres of land cultivated with various different types of rubber trees in Ceylon alone. These plantations were able to produce latex with greater efficiency and productivity. Consequently, with lower costs and a lower final price, the British Empire assumed control of the world rubber market.

The Amazon's rubber was undercut in the world market and demand for it fell. This rapidly resulted in the stagnation of the regional economy. There was a lack of entrepreneurial or governmental vision to find alternatives for development. The "rubber barons" and economic elite followed the money, leaving the region to seek their next fortunes elsewhere.

Although the railroad and the cities of Porto Velho and Guajará-Mirim remained as a legacy to this bright economic period, the recession caused by the end of the rubber boom left profound scars on the Amazon region. There was a massive loss of state tax income, high levels of unemployment, rural and urban emigration, and abandoned and unneeded housing. Those who remained in the region had few expectations for the future. Deprived of their income, the rubber workers remained in the periphery of Manaus, searching for new work. Because of the lack of housing, in the 1920s they built the cidade flutuante ("floating city"), a type of residence that was consolidated in the 1960s.

To try to stem the crisis, the central government of Brazil created the Superintendência de Defesa da Borracha ("Superintendency of Defence of Rubber"). It was inefficient and unable to effect real change, and, for this reason, it was eliminated soon after its creation.

In the 1930s, Henry Ford, the United States automobile pioneer, undertook the cultivation of rubber trees in the Amazon region. He established the city of Fordlândia in the west part of Pará state, specifically for this end, together with worker housing and planned community amenities. The plantation suffered from a leaf pest and the effort failed.

=== Rubber barons ===
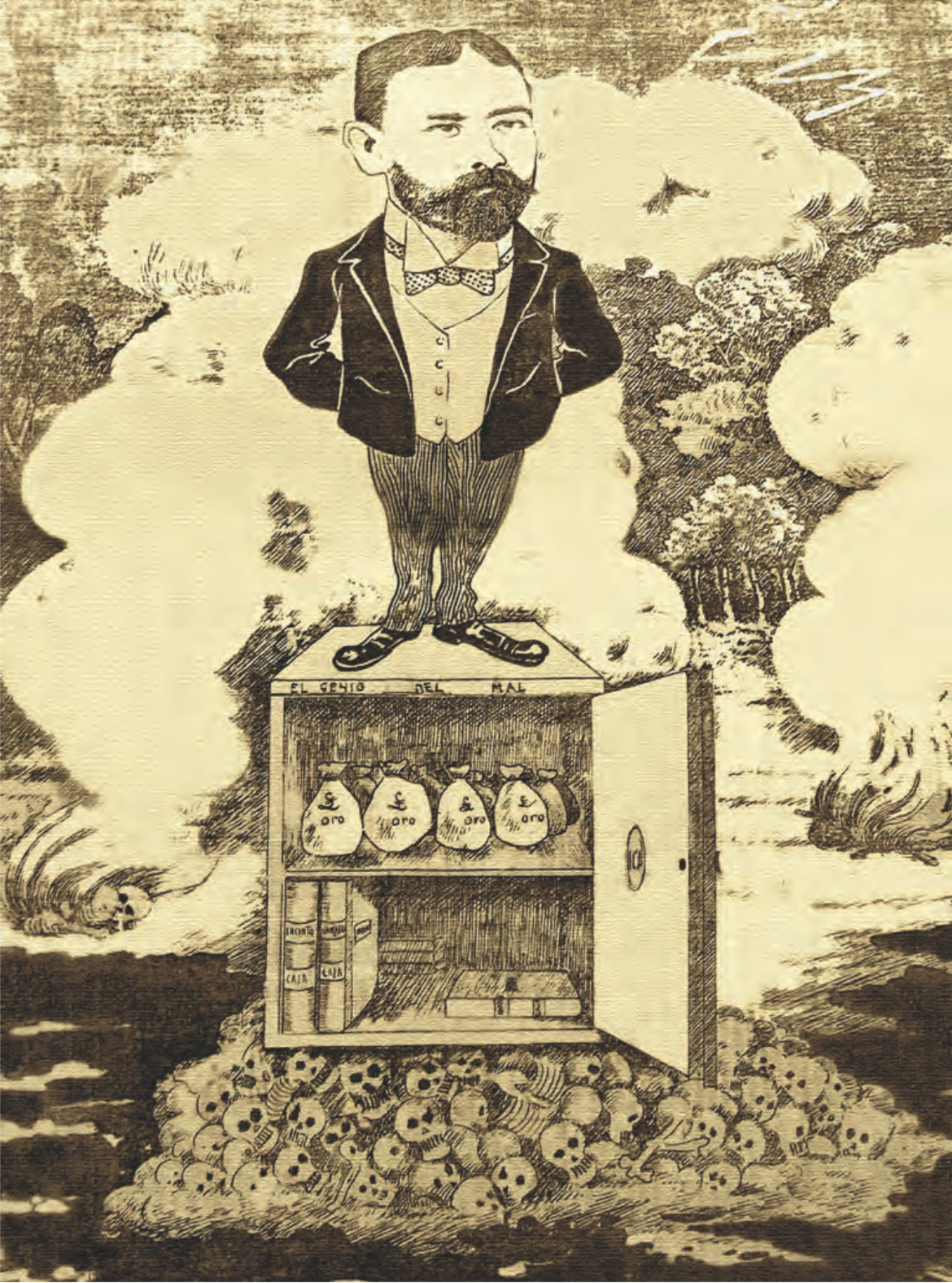
Illustration of the rubber baron Julio César Arana, published by La Felpa in 1908

The term ‘Rubber baron’ relates to the successful business entrepreneurs of the rubber boom, between 1870 and 1913. The rubber boom incentivized exploration and colonization: starting a competition between the countries of Brazil, Bolivia, Colombia, Ecuador and Peru for amazon territory rich in rubber. The rubber barons of South America often made it their business to enslave the local indigenous tribes, who would collect rubber for them. Private colonization was an extended strategy for the occupation of frontier areas throughout the Americas. The delegation of sovereignty by the national states allowed them to advance inter-state disputes and to eradicate or subordinate indigenous, up to then independent peoples from the Amazon to Tierra del Fuego. The extracting efforts of Julio Arana, Carlos Fitzcarrald, Carlos Scharff and Nicolás Suárez resulted in horrific abuses against the native populations: with the most infamous being the Putumayo genocide, perpetrated by Arana's company. Arana exploited and abused the tribes of the Putumayo, enslaving the Huitoto, Boras, Andoques and other peoples in that region. Fitzcarrald displaced and induced tribes along the Ucayali, Marañon, Urubamba and Madre de Dios basin to tap rubber for him. After Fitzcarrald's drowned with his business partner Antonio Vaca Díez in the Urubamba river, his territories saw an increase in crime and abuse until the collapse of the holdings. Nicolás Suárez benefitted greatly from their deaths: and due to a partnership he had with the two, retained many of Fitzcarralds workers along with a large portion of his fleet. Suárez survived and thrived in the rubber industry, becoming the biggest exporter of the product in Bolivia. While Arana lost his biggest competitor in Peru and Iquitos. Carlos Scharff also benefitted largely from the 1897 river accident, and assumed operational control over a portion of Fitzcarrald's enterprise. The rubber barons played an important role in regional politics, sometimes ruling as the government of an area. This culminated in events like the Acre War, and a dictatorial junta in Venezuela under the leadership of Tomás Funes. Another prominent example is the Colombia-Peru War in the 1930s, which Julio César Arana had a role in instigating.

== Second rubber boom, 1942–1945 ==
Changes in the world economy during the Second World War created a new rubber boom, although it was of brief duration. As Japan dominated the western Pacific Ocean from the beginning of 1942 and invaded Malaysia, the rubber plantations there came under their control. As a result, the Allies lost access to 97% of Asian rubber production.

United States companies invested in the region and their managers played an active role. New buildings were constructed in Belém and Manaus. An example was the Grande Hotel, a luxurious hotel constructed in Belém in only three years, which today is the Hilton Hotel. The US also developed new synthetic rubbers such as Government Rubber-Styrene which helped to bridge the inevitable gap in rubber supplies for truck and car tyres.

=== Rubber battle ===
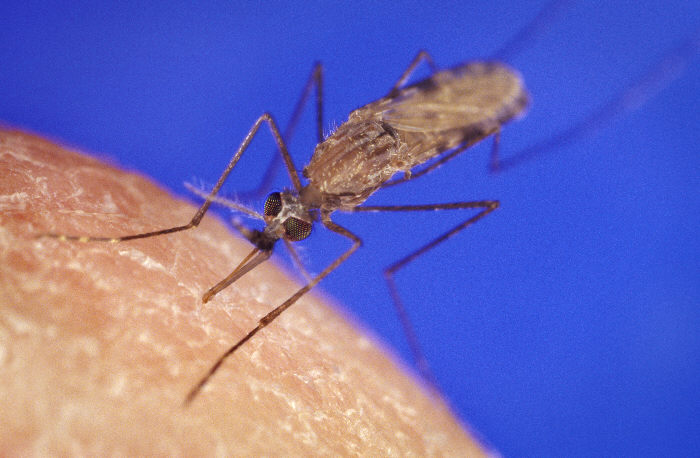
Anopheles Mosquito, the vector of malaria and yellow fever, diseases which caused many deaths among the rubber workers

Eager to supply the Allied Forces with the rubber needed for war equipment, the Brazilian government made an agreement with the United States government (the Washington Accords). It set goals for the large-scale extraction of Amazon latex, an operation which became known as the Batalha da borracha ("rubber battle"), for the manpower and effort devoted to the project.

After the rubber forests were abandoned, no more than 35,000 workers remained in the region. The great challenge of Brazil was to increase the annual production of latex from 18,000 to 45,000 tons, as set in the agreement. For this, 100,000 men were needed.

During the same period, the northeast part of Brazil had suffered a devastating drought and an unprecedented crisis for its farmers. Brazil decided to recruit new rubber workers from that region. The Estado Novo in 1943 ordered the compulsory enlisting of workers in the Serviço Especial de Mobilização de Trabalhadores para a Amazônia (SEMTA; "Special Service of Mobilization of Workers for the Amazon"), based in the northeast, in Fortaleza. Brazilian president Getúlio Vargas reduced the problem of the economic blight and at the same time increased colonization of the Amazon Basin.

In addition to SEMTA, the government created other organizations to support the rubber battle: the Superintendência para o Abastecimento do Vale da Amazônia (SAVA: the Superintendency for the Provisioning of the Amazon Valley), the Serviço Especial de Saúde Pública (SESP: the Special Service of Public Health), and the Serviço de Navegação da Amazônia e de Administração do Porto do Pará (SNAPP: Navigation Service of the Amazon and Administration of the Port of Pará). The Banco de Crédito da Borracha (Rubber Credit Bank) was also created. Later in 1950 it became the Banco de Crédito da Amazônia (Amazon Credit Bank).

The international organization Rubber Development Corporation (RDC), financed with capital from United States industries, covered the expenses of relocating the migrants (known at the time os brabos). The United States government paid the Brazilian government $100 for every worker delivered to the Amazon.

Thousands of workers from various regions of Brazil were transported under force to obligatory servitude. Many suffered death by tropical diseases of the region, such as malaria and yellow fever. The northeast region sent 54,000 workers to the Amazon alone, 30,000 of which were from Ceará. These new rubber workers were called soldados da borracha ("rubber soldiers") in a clear allusion to the role of the latex in supplying the U.S. factories with the rubber necessary to fight the war.

In 1849 Manaus had 5,000 inhabitants, expanding in the next half-century to 70,000. During World War II, the region again enjoyed prosperity. Money began to circulate in Manaus, Belém, and other cities and towns nearby, and the regional economy gained strength.

For many workers, it was a one-way journey. About 30,000 rubber workers died in the Amazon, after having exhausted their energies extracting the "white gold." They died of malaria, yellow fever, and hepatitis; they also suffered attacks by animals such as panthers, serpents, and scorpions. The Brazilian government did not fulfill its promise to return the "rubber soldiers" to their homes at the end of the war as heroes and with housing comparable to that of the military veterans. It is estimated that only about 6,000 workers managed to return to their homes, at their own expense. In the 21st century, the decreasing number of survivors have challenged the government for recognition and compensation for themselves and their families for their contributions to the war effort.

== In media ==
- The events of La Voragine or The Vortex, a novel written by José Eustasio Rivera are based on real events that occurred in three different areas of Colombia between 1905 and 1922. Prior to writing the novel Eustasio was a part of a commission to determine the border between Venezuela and Colombia. During this journey he became personally familiar with the topics he would write about in his book, and gained insight into the rubber industry. Eustasio's novel is widely regarded as a major work of Latin American literature from the 20th century.
- The 1982 film Fitzcarraldo depicts the first rubber boom.
- The 2015 film Embrace of the Serpent depicts Amazonian rubber harvesting.

== See also ==
- Benjamin Saldaña Rocca
- Drought in Northeastern Brazil
- Brazilian cacao boom
- Brazilian cotton cycle
- Brazilian sugar cycle
- Carlos Fitzcarrald
- Environmental history of Latin America
- Euclides da Cunha
- Julio César Arana
- Latin American economy
- Nicolás Suárez Callaú
- Patagonian sheep farming boom
- Peru: Abuses against the Putumayo Indians
- Peruvian Amazon Company
- Putumayo genocide

== Bibliography ==
- Casement, Roger (1997). The Amazon journal of Roger Casement. Angus Mitchell. ISBN 1-901990-00-1.
- Department of State (1913). Slavery in Peru: Message from the President of the United States Transmitting Report of the Secretary of State, with Accompanying Papers, Concerning the Alleged Existence of Slavery in Peru. United States. Department of State.
- Enock, Charles (1908). The Andes and the Amazon. T. Fisher Unwin, 1908.
- Fuentes, Hildebrando (1908). Loreto; apuntes geográficos, históricos, estadísticos, políticos y sociales. La Revista, 1908.
- García Hierro, Pedro; Hvalkof, Søren; Gray, Andrew (1998). Liberation through land rights in the Peruvian Amazon. The International Work Group for Indigenous Affairs.
- Gray, Andrew (1996). The Arakmbut--mythology, Spirituality, and History. Berghahn Books. p. 14. ISBN 9781571818768.
- Harambour, Alberto y Margarita Serje, eds (2023). La Era del Imperio y las fronteras de la civilización en América del Sur. Bogotá y Santiago: Ediciones UniAndes y Pehuén.
- Hardenburg, Walter (1912). The Putumayo, the Devil's Paradise; Travels in the Peruvian Amazon Region and an Account of the Atrocities Committed Upon the Indians Therein. London: Fischer Unwin. ISBN 1372293019.
- Huertas Castillo, Beatriz (2004). Indigenous peoples in isolation in the Peruvian Amazon. The International Work Group for Indigenous Affairs.
- Lino e Silva, Moisés; Wardle, Huon (2016). Freedom in Practice Governance, Autonomy and Liberty in the Everyday. Taylor & Francis. ISBN 9781317415497.
- Santos-Granero, Fernando (2018). Slavery and Utopia The Wars and Dreams of an Amazonian World Transformer. University of Texas Press. ISBN 9781477316436.
- Tully, John (2011). The Devil's Milk: A Social History of Rubber. New York University Press. ISBN 978-1583672600.
- Valcárcel, Carlos (2004). El proceso del Putumayo y sus secretos inauditos. The International Work Group for Indigenous Affairs.
- Varese, Stefano (2002). Salt of the Mountain Campa Asháninka History and Resistance in the Peruvian Jungle. University of Oklahoma Press. ISBN 0806134461.
