= Ajajú River =

River in Colombia

Location
- Country: Colombia

Physical characteristics
- Mouth: Apaporis River
  - location: confluence with Tunía River, Caquetá, Colombia
  - coordinates: 1°11′05″N 72°43′37″W
- Length: 770 km (480 mi)

Ajajú River is a river of Colombia and a tributary of Apaporis River. It is part of the Amazon River basin.

== See also ==
- List of rivers of Colombia
