= Sib (anthropology) =

Group of people recognized by an individual as kin

Sib is a technical term in the discipline of anthropology which originally denoted a kinship group among Anglo-Saxon and other Germanic peoples. In an extended sense, it then became the standard term for a variety of other kinds of lineal (matrilineal or patrilineal) or cognatic (i.e., descended through links of both sexes) kinship groups. The word may also denote a member of such a group.

American anthropologists often used the term 'sib' as the generic term for a category that breaks down into the sub-classifications of patri-sib, referring to patrilineal clan descent, and matri-sib, to refer to matrilineal clan descent.
