= Hildebrando Fuentes =

Peruvian politician and lawyer (1860–1917)

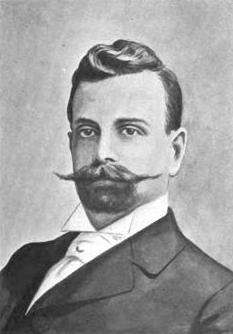
- Born: 1860; Lima, Peru
- Died: December 1917 (aged 56–57); Rochester, New York, US
- Education: University of San Marcos
- Occupations: Politician, lawyer

Hildebrando Fuentes (1860 – December 1917) was a Peruvian politician and lawyer and was one of the prominent figures in the social and intellectual life of Lima, Peru.

== Biography ==
Fuentes was born in 1860 in Lima to a prominent family; His parents were Manuel Fuentes and Gertrudis Nuñez del Prado. He entered the University of San Marcos at a very early age and completed his course in law with distinction. He volunteered for the military during the War of the Pacific and was distinguished in battle, earning the rank of colonel and winning the lasting friendship of General Andrés Avelino Cáceres, under whose subsequent administration he held various important offices.

Fuentes held various political posts, including secretary to the prefecture of Lima; prefect of Lambayeque, of Cuzco, of Loreto, and of Lima. During the first administration of Andrés Avelino Cáceres he was made secretary to the President. Subsequently, he was elected as deputy for the provinces of Pallasca, Santa, and Huamalíes; and made vice president of the Chamber of Deputies. Following this, he was appointed Minister of Government and Police (ministro de gobierno y policia) in the cabinet.

Aside from his political activities, Fuentes was prominently identified with educational and literary work. For some years, he held the chair of metaphysics, statistics, and finance at the University of San Marcos, while at various times he was the editor of such prominent publications as El Nacional, El Diario, La Reconstitución, El Perú, and La Revista Militar y Navel. He was the author of many literary and historical works, and among other honors conferred upon him were memberships in the Atheneum of Lima, the Geographical Society of Lima, and various literary and scientific organizations.

He died in December 1917 in a sanatorium Rochester, New York, to which he had traveled on account of his ill health.
