= Apaporis River =

River in Colombia

- Apaporis drainage basin
- Native name: Rio Apaporis (Portuguese)

Location
- Countries: Colombia; Brazil

Physical characteristics
- Source
  - location: Confluence of the Ajajú and Tunía River, Caquetá, Colombia
- Mouth
  - location: Japurá River, Amazonas, Brazil
  - coordinates: 1°22′34″S 69°25′10″W
- Length: 960 km (600 mi)
- Basin size: 53,509 km^{2} (20,660 sq mi) 57,430.6 km^{2} (22,174.1 mi^{2})
- Discharge
  - location: Confluence of Caquetá, Brazil, Amazonas State
  - average: 4,092 m^{3}/s (144,500 cu ft/s) 3,657.463 m^{3}/s (129,162.1 cu ft/s)

Basin features
- River system: Japurá River
- Tributaries
  - left: Pira Paraná River

The Apaporis River is a river of the Vaupés Department, Colombia. It is a tributary of the Japurá River (Caquetá River). In the last stretch, before the river joins the Caquetá River, it forms part of the boundary between Colombia and Brazil.

== See also ==
- List of rivers of Colombia
- List of rivers of Brazil
