= Pira Paraná River =

River in Colombia

- Mouth location in Colombia
- Native name: Rio Pira Paraná (Portuguese)

Location
- Country: Colombia

Physical characteristics
- Mouth
  - coordinates: 0°25′57″S 70°15′12″W

Basin features
- River system: Apaporis River

The Pira Paraná River is a river of the Vaupés Department, Colombia. It is a left-bank tributary of the Apaporis River.

People of the Eastern Tucano language group live along the river.

The main figure of the "Rock of Nyi", a group of several rocks with some petroglyphs standing near by the Equator, got a graffiti in the 1970s by a Protestant missionary.

== See also ==
- List of rivers of Colombia
