= Kotiria language =

Tucanoan language spoken in Brazil and Colombia

Kotiria
- Wanano
- Native to: Brazil, Colombia
- Ethnicity: Kotiria
- Native speakers: (2,600 cited 1998–2007)
- Language family: Tucanoan: Eastern; North; Kotiria

Language codes
- ISO 639-3: gvc
- Glottolog: guan1269
- ELP: Wanano
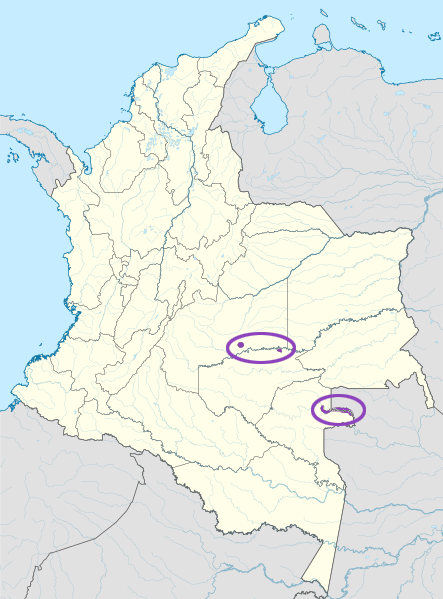

Kotiria (also known as Wanano) is a Tucanoan language spoken in the northwest part of Amazonas in Brazil and in Vaupés in Colombia. It is spoken by the Kotiria. The Kotiria and the closely related Pira-tapuya do not intermarry, but their languages are 75% lexically similar.

== Classification ==
Kotiria is a member of the Tucanoan language family, which is found in northwest Amazonia. The Tukanoan family can be sub-categorized into two groups: Western Tukanoan Languages and Eastern Tucanoan Languages, Kotiria belonging to the Eastern Tucanoan family. The Eastern Tukanoan group is much larger than the Western Tukanoan family with 16 languages and around 28,000 speakers, while the Western Tucanoan family has 4 languages with around 3,000 speakers.

Kotiria belongs to the Northern branch of the Eastern Tucanoan languages, along with Tucano.

== Documentation ==
The first known work on the Kotiria language was a grammatical outline recorded by a Salesian missionary named Antônio Giacone in 1967. Since then a lot of work has been conducted by Nathan and Carolyn Waltz who have worked with the SIL organization in Colombia from 1963 to 1996. They have published a pedagogical grammar (Waltz 1976), papers on the aspects of Kotiria phonology (Waltz and Waltz 1967, Waltz 1982, Waltz 2002), a volume containing a study of Kotiria kinship terms, a grammatical sketch of the language and a long interlinearized text (Waltz and Waltz 1997) and the grammatical overview of Kotiria found in the Caro y Cuervo collection (Waltz and Waltz 2000). In 2007, Nathan Waltz published a Kotiria – Spanish dictionary (Waltz 2007). More research has been done on the Kotiria language by Dr. Kristine Stenzel who has been conducting research in the Upper Rio Negro area since 2000. She has published a book on the grammar of Kotiri) that discusses the morphology and syntax of the language (Stenzel 2015). Along with this book she has written many articles about different aspects of the Kotiria language and people (Stenzel 2005a, 2005b, 2006, 2007, 2008a, 2008b, 2008c, 2009a, 2009b, 2009c, 2010, 2012, 2014) (Stenzel 2015).

Kotiria was described in a language documentation project funded by Programa de Documentação de Línguas e Culturas Indígenas (ProDocLin) at the Museu do Índio. The project was coordinated by Dr. Kristine Stenzel and was a teaching workshop of Kotiria pedagogical grammar (Saltarelli 2014).

== Phonology ==
=== Consonants ===
		Bilabial	Alveolar	Postalveolar	Velar	Glottal
Plosive	voiceless	p	t		k	ʔ
Plosive	voiced	b	d		ɡ	ʔ
Affricate				tʃ		
Fricative			s			h
Approximant		w		j		
Flap			r			

Nasalization is carried on vowels. Voiced plosives and /j/ may surface as the nasal consonants [m], [n], [ŋ], and [ɲ] in the environment of nasal vowels.

=== Vowels ===
	Front	Central	Back
High	i	ɨ	u
Low	e	a	o

=== Suprasegmentals ===
Syllables may be marked with either a high or low stress accent. Nasalization is suprasegmental and moves from left to right through a word.

== Morphology ==
Wanano is a nominative accusative language with an SOV sentence structure that contains the following grammatical categories: nouns, verbs, particles, pronouns, and interrogatives. These are outlined in Stenzel’s Reference Grammar of Wanano (2004). Under nouns Stenzel goes into further detail regarding the animates: human vs non-human animates and inanimates: mass nouns vs count nouns (xi). Stenzel discusses the pronouns which will be examined further below. For verbs Kotiria have suffix morphemes that indicate evidentiality, as well as imperative, interrogative and irregular morphemes. While there are adverbial morphemes in Kotiria, there are no adjectives.

=== Pronouns ===
Pronouns in Kotiria are categorized by personal, possessive, interrogative and demonstrative. A like English, gender is seen in 3rd person pronouns only. The pronouns are categorized into deictic for 1st and 2nd person and anaphoric for 3rd person.

==== Personal pronouns ====
			Singular	Plural
Deictic	1st Person	EXCL	yʉ'ʉ	~sa
Deictic	1st Person	INCL	yʉ'ʉ	~badi
Deictic	2nd Person		~bʉ'ʉ	~bʉ-sa
Anaphoric	3rd Person	F	ti-ko-ro	ti ~dubia
Anaphoric	3rd Person	M	ti-ro	ti-~da

ti-ro yoa-ro-pʉ wa’a-ra
ANPH-SG be.long-PART-LOC go-VIS.PERF.NON.1
He went far away.

==== Possessive pronouns ====
		Singular	Plural
1st Person	EXCL	yʉ	~sa
1st Person	INCL	yʉ	~bari
2nd Person		~bʉ	~bʉ'sa
3rd Person		to	ti

yʉ phʉ-kʉ
1SG parent-MASC
my father

==== Interrogative pronouns ====
English	Kotiria
How much	~do'o-puru
How many	~do'o-pe
What	Yaba
Who	~doa
Where	~do'o-i

~doa hi-hari ti-ko-ro
who INT.IMPERF ANPH-FEM-SG
Who is she?

==== Demonstrative pronouns ====
	This	These	That	Those	Here	There (distal)	There (remote)	Other
Deictic	a'ri	a'ri-~da	Si	si-~da (animate) si-re (inanimate)			To	
Anaphoric			ti				To	Pa
Distance					~o	~so'o	To	

a’ri-ro
DEM:PROX-SG
This man

si-ro
DEM:PROX-SG
That man

~o-i
DEIC:PROX-LOC
Here

~so’o-pʉ
DEIC:DIST-LOC
There (distal)

to-pʉ
REM-LOC
There (remote)

pa-iro
other-NOM:SG
another one

===== Other =====
Gender coding of nouns is a morphological aspect discussed in the grammar of Kotiria. Nouns with human referents are obligatorily marked for gender, most noun roots with human referents are masculine, otherwise feminine if marked by morpho-phonological means. The gender coding suffix -ko that appears at the end of the noun is feminine while -kʉ is masculine, for example phʉ-ko-ro (mother) and phʉ-kʉ-ro (father). Sometimes these endings can be reduced to o for feminine and ʉ for masculine. Examples of this are ~ducho-ro (grandmother) and ~duchʉ-ro (grandfather).

A mass noun is a noun that has no plural form, not meaning singular but that it is an uncountable referent. For example, you cannot count water however you can weigh it to measure its mass. By adding the morpheme –ro to the root of a mass noun or verb in Kotiria, it changes into a count noun. Some examples of this are: ko (water) is turned into ko-ro (rainstorm) by adding –ro; tha (grass) is turned into tha-ro (field).

== Syntax ==
Kotiria is a nominative-accusative case system, this means that the subject of the transitive and intransitive verbs are marked the same way.

=== Intransitive ===
Intransitive verbs are verbs that require a single nominal argument. Below are some examples.

yʉ’ʉ hi-ha ko-iro
1SG COP-VIS.IMPERF.1 relative-NOM:SG
I am your/a relative.

~dubi-a da’ra wa’a-ra wese-pʉ
woman-PL work go-VIS.IMPERF.NON.1 garden-LOC
Women go to work in the garden.

to ~badu-ro pase-pʉ wa’a-a
3SG.POSS husband-SG far.away.-LOC go-ASSERT.PERF
Her husband left.

=== Transitive ===
Transitive verbs are verbs that require two core nominal arguments.

a’ri thu-re hoa-ha ~sa kooti-ri-a
DEM:PROX CLS:stacked-OBJ write-VIS.IMPERF.1 1PL:EXC Wanano-NOM-PL
We Wananos are writing this book.

ti-ro tia-ro ka-ya-re ~waha-a
ANPH-SG three-PART black.monkey-PL-OBJ kill-ASSERT.PERF
He killed three monkeys.

ti-ro ~yabi-re ~tidi-ra
ANPH-SG night-TMP walk-VIS.IMPERF.NON.1
A firefly comes out at night.

ti-ro ~da-ra ti-re ti-~phi-re wese-pʉ-re
ANPH-SG bring/take-VIS.IMPERF.NON.1 ANPH-CLS:generic ANPH-CLS:bladelike-OBJ garden-LOC-OBJ
He always takes the machete to the garden.

~bʉ’ʉ yahiri~pho’da-re yʉ’ʉ-re wa-ga
2SG(POSS) heart-OBJ 1SG-OBJ give-IMPER
Give me your heart.

to ~ba-kʉ-ro-~ka-re ~da-wʉa-rʉka-ga
3SG.POSS child-MASC-SG-DIM.-OBJ bring/take-pick.up-INCEP-ASSERT.PERF
She picked up her little boy

As we can see from the examples above, Kotiria is a nominative accusative language. For example, in example 1, 1SG yʉˈʉ is the same as in example 8. In example 9, the 3SG to is the same as in example 3. As well as in example 6 ANPH-SG ti is the same as in example 5.

=== Transitive motion verbs ===
Transitive motion verbs frequently occur with adjunct expressions coded only by the locative -pʉ and there are certain motion verbs in Kotiria which can be syntactically transitive. In other words, they take a second, oblique argument coded by -pʉ-re.

~ayo ~o-pʉ-re yʉ’ʉ kho’a-wi’i-kʉ-ka
so/then DEIC:PROX-LOC-OBJ 1SG return-COMPL-NON.3.MASC-PREDICT.
That’s how I’ll get back here.

ku’tu-~ka-pʉ-re phi’a-sʉ-’a
clearing-DIM-LOC-OBJ MOV.out.into-COMPL-ASSERT.PERF
(He) went out into a little clearing.

Kotiria is typologically nominative-accusative, and that it codes the grammatical rather than the semantic roles of core arguments.

== Semantics ==
=== Plural morphemes ===
The most common plural morpheme used in Kotiria is -a/ ̴da. The alternation between the two is still unclear however there is a tendency for ̴da to be used for animates with human referents, for example pho’da (children), while –a is used for other animates. When pluralizing male or females the morphemes - ̴sʉba (male) and ̴sa ̴dubia (female) are used. Some examples of this are:

female	male
~dubi-a female-PL 'females' or 'women'	~bʉ-a male-PL 'males' or 'men'
~yucho ~sa ~dubi-a grandmother 1.EXC.POSS woman-PL 'grandmothers'	~yuchʉ-~sʉba grandfather-PL 'grandfathers' or 'ancestors'
~dabo ~sa ~dubi-a wife 1.EXC.POSS woman-PL 'wives'	~badʉ-~sʉba husband-PL 'husbands'

For pluralizing animals, since they are non-human the morpheme –a is used. There are some exceptions where –ya is used. Some examples of this are:

~phido-ro → ~phido-a
snake {} snake-PL

bora-ro → boraro-a
curupira {} curupira-PL

~die-ro → ~die-ya
dog {} dogs

The word die-ya 'dogs' can become 'female dogs' when suffixed with ̴dubia 'woman'.

Dieya- ~dubia
dogs females
Female dogs.

== Sources ==
- Chernela, Janet M. (1996). The Wanano Indians of the Brazilian Amazon. University of Texas Press. Archived from the original on 2013-12-18.
- Moore, Dennis albert; Galucio, Ana Vilacy; Júnior, Nilson Gabas (2008). "Desafio de documentar e preservar línguas" (PDF). Scientific American Brasil. 3: 36–43. Archived from the original (PDF) on 14 May 2014.
- Stenzel, Kristine (2004). A reference grammar of Wanano (PDF) (Ph.D. thesis). University of Colorado.
