= Pacaraima =

Municipality of Roraima, Brazil

- Municipality
- Municipality of Pacaraima
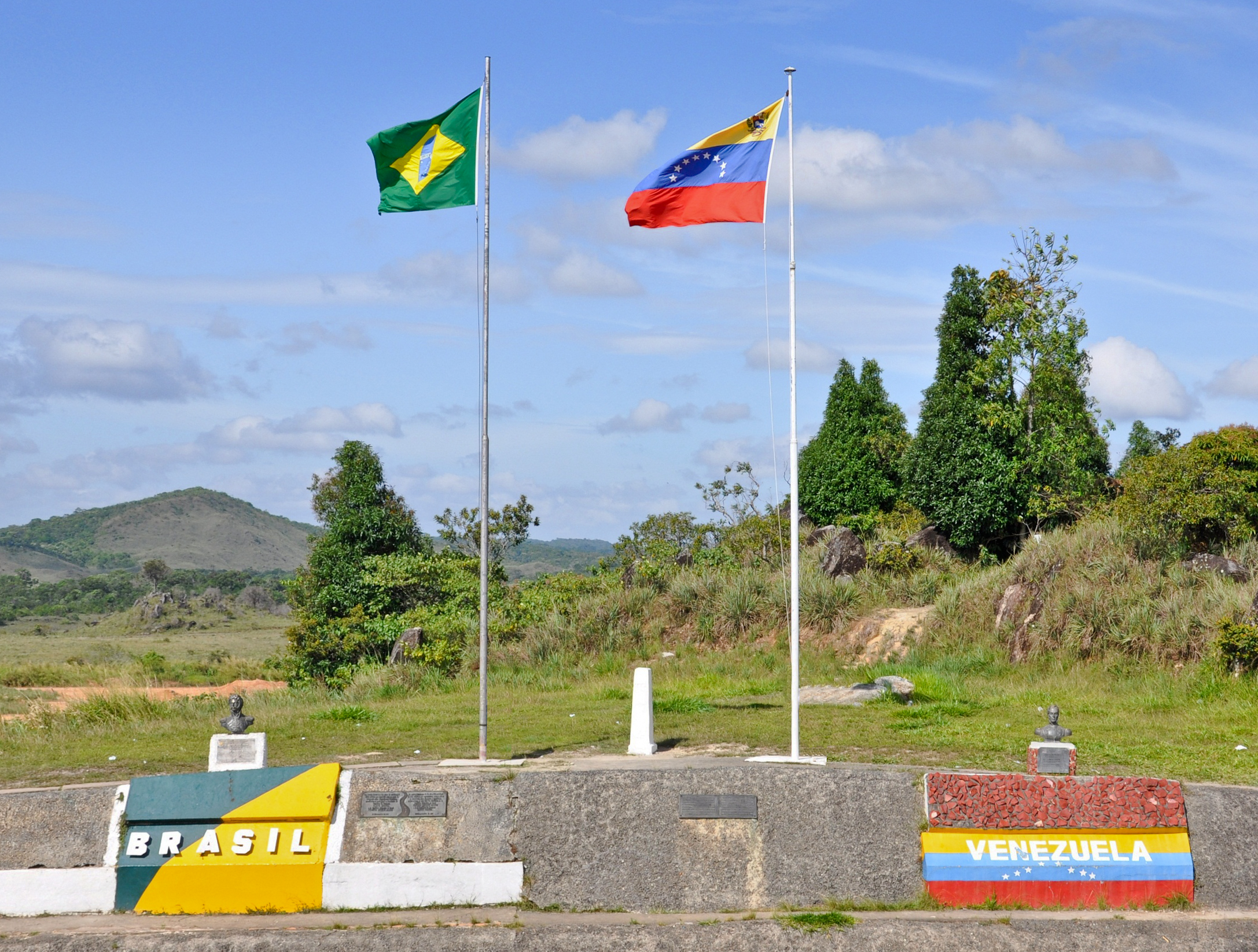
- The border mark located on the border between Brazil and Venezuela, in Pacaraima

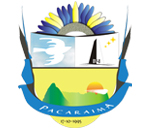
- Flag Coat of arms
- Nickname: Polo Norte de Roraima (North Pole of Roraima)
- Location in Roraima
- Coordinates: 4°25′52″N 61°08′46″W
- Country: Brazil
- Region: North
- State: Roraima

Government
  - Mayor: Juliano Torquato (PRB)

Area
  - Total: 8,028.428 km^{2} (3,099.793 sq mi)
- Elevation: 920 m (3,020 ft)

Population (2022)
  - Total: 19,305
  - Density: 2.4046/km^{2} (6.2278/sq mi)
- Demonym: Pacaraimense
- Time zone: UTC−4 (AMT)
- HDI (2010): 0.650 – medium
- Website: pacaraima.rr.gov.br

Pacaraima (Portuguese pronunciation: [pakaˈɾajmɐ]) is a municipality located in the northwest of the state of Roraima in Brazil. It is second most northern municipality in Brazil, behind Uiramutã.

Located here within Indigenous Land San Marcos is a major indigenous artifact. Pedra Pintada is a large rock that is covered with ancient indigenous pictographs and other designs of an early culture. Visitation to the site may only be arranged through explicit permission from the National Indian Foundation.

== History ==
The history of the municipality of Pacaraima is linked to the demarcation of the border with Venezuela by the Brazilian Army, originating around the landmark known as BV-8, gateway to Brazil from Venezuela. Also noteworthy is the deployment of a Special Border Squadron in the region.

However, colonization would intensify with the full arrival of Brazilians, mainly from the Northeast Region of Brazil, attracted by the dream of easy enrichment with the garimpo. Free cross-border mobility made it necessary to formalize the demarcation and protection of that frontier.

The pioneer Brazilians in the region are considered their pioneers, although they are accidental founders and almost unknown to the municipality. Once known as Vila Pacaraima, or simply BV-8, adopting the name of the landmark, the village was part of the then Federal Territory of Roraima, present state of Roraima.

Pacaraima was emancipated by State Law No. 96, dated October 17, 1995, and the municipality was formed by the dismemberment of Boa Vista, the state capital. Its installation took place on January 1, 1997, with the inauguration of the first mayor elected by direct vote, the agronomist engineer Hiperion de Oliveira and the nine councilors that compose the City Council, in an election held on October 3, 1996.

The municipal headquarters functions until today as a commercial warehouse, attracting several buyers of basic consumer goods from the neighboring municipality.

== Urban infrastructure ==
Access to the city of Pacaraima takes the highway BR-174, which is paved and with good state of conservation. The distance to Boa Vista is 220 kilometers (about 136 miles).

There is a regular bus service available to the municipality from Boa Vista. There are also services of autonomous drivers that make the route. Pacaraima is connected to the state power grid, with energy coming from Macágua, Venezuela.

== Tourism ==
The seat of the municipality of Pacaraima, on the border of Brazil and Venezuela, is embedded in a region of valleys surrounded by mountains. The mountainous region is one of the mildest in Roraima. The indigenous peoples themselves administer some tourism services provided to visitors. Some attractions:

=== Traditional festivities ===
- Micaraima - First weekend after the carnival.
- Padroeiro - Celebrated on October 4.

=== Attractions ===
- Trilha da Nova Esperança - Located within the indigenous reserve of São Marcos, possessing a great diversity of fauna and flora. Access requires FUNAI authorization.
- Pedra Pintada - Place of great archaeological wealth, with rock inscriptions and many curiosities. Access by highways BR-174 and RR-400.

== Geography ==
The municipality of Pacaraima, with a height of 920 m, is considered the highest municipality in the state of Roraima and throughout the Northern Region of Brazil.

=== Climate ===
Pacaraima has a tropical monsoon climate (Am, according to the Köppen climate classification), with average annual compensated temperature of 21.8 °C (71.2 °F). In most months of the year there is significant rainfall, there is only a short dry season and it is not very effective.

March, the hottest month, has an average temperature of 22.4 °C (72.3 °F). While July, the coldest month, presents 21 °C (70 °F) of average temperature. The average annual rainfall is 1,906 millimetres (75.0 in).

Climate data for Pacaraima, Roraima
Month	Jan	Feb	Mar	Apr	May	Jun	Jul	Aug	Sep	Oct	Nov	Dec	Year
Mean daily maximum °C (°F)	27.6 (81.7)	28.1 (82.6)	28.7 (83.7)	28 (82)	27.1 (80.8)	26.2 (79.2)	25.9 (78.6)	26.6 (79.9)	27.9 (82.2)	28.3 (82.9)	28.1 (82.6)	27.7 (81.9)	27.5 (81.5)
Mean daily minimum °C (°F)	15.5 (59.9)	15.8 (60.4)	16.1 (61.0)	16.6 (61.9)	17 (63)	16.8 (62.2)	16.2 (61.2)	16.2 (61.2)	15.7 (60.3)	15.9 (60.6)	16.1 (61.0)	15.7 (60.3)	16.1 (61.1)
Average precipitation mm (inches)	61 (2.4)	37 (1.5)	109 (4.3)	142 (5.6)	260 (10.2)	288 (11.3)	283 (11.1)	238 (9.4)	157 (6.2)	115 (4.5)	119 (4.7)	97 (3.8)	1,906 (75)
Source: Climate-data.org
