= Cueva Pintada (disambiguation) =

Cueva Pintada typically refers to Painted Cave, Galdar. It may also refer to:

- Painted Cave, California
- Pedra Pintada, Roraima
- Caverna da Pedra Pintada
