= Nhamini-wi =

Alleged ancient trail in the Amazon rainforest

The Nhamini-wi is, according to indigenous oral history, an ancient trail leading from the Amazon jungle to the mountains in the west.

== Myth ==
Indigenous peoples in Brazil and Colombia from the upper Rio Negro, such as the Tukano people and the Pira-tapuya, have a common narrative that their elders tell about the Nhamini-wi, which that led west to the "house of the night." The house was so called because that is where the sun disappeared for several days, leaving the people in total darkness. Large groups of soldiers traveled this road carrying loads of baskets filled with “insects of gold”. It is said that they would take them to the mountains to be given as gifts to the Gods so as not to darken the sun again. But opening these baskets before they arrived would cause the sun to leave. Many tribes’ narratives say that some of the baskets were opened and the resulting darkness caused the trail to never be used again. The Tukano tribe says that the trail began at axpeko-dixtara, the "Lake of Milk" in the east, believed to be Lake Parime. The trail is also known as the "trail of tears" due to large groups of widows that were told to have traveled by it.

== Possible evidence of existence ==
The location of this pre-Columbian road is believed to be in Northern Brazil in the Amazon region. 19th century Brazilian writer Barbosa Rodrigues wrote about ruins that existed in the forests north of Rio Negro. In 1977 artist and explorer Roland Stevenson traveled up the Rio Negro in search of the same stone ruins. Led by indigenous guides he found old and collapsed stone walls that were dotted every twenty kilometers along an east to western line.

== Significance of find ==
The existence of the Nhamini-wi supports theories of the existence of Inca roads that traveled far into the Amazon Basin. It also supports the possibility of the reality of the legendary city of El Dorado near Lake Parime.
