= Waʼikhana language =

Language

Piratapuyo
- Wahicjana
- Native to: Brazil, Colombia
- Ethnicity: Pira-tapuya
- Native speakers: (1,070 cited 1986)
- Language family: Tucanoan: Eastern; North; Piratapuyo

Language codes
- ISO 639-3: pir
- Glottolog: pira1254
- ELP: Piratapuyo

Piratapuyo (Wahicjana [waʔikhana]) is a Tucanoan language of Brazil and Colombia, spoken by the Piratapuyo.

== Phonology ==
=== Consonants ===
Piratapuyo consonant phonemes
		Bilabial	Alveolar	Palatal	Velar	Glottal
Occlusive	voiceless	p	t		k ⟨c, qu⟩	ʔ ⟨h⟩
Occlusive	voiced	b ⟨b, m⟩	d ⟨d, n⟩		g ⟨g⟩	
Spirant			s			h ⟨j⟩
Vibrant			ɾ ⟨r, l⟩			
Continuant		w		j ⟨y, ñ⟩		

/ʔ/, /ɾ/, /ɡ/ do not occur word-initially, and /h/ is rare in this position.

All consonants but /s/ and /ʔ/ have a nasal allophone before nasal vowels. For the voiced plosives /b d ɡ/, these are the nasal stops [m n ŋ]. The others include voiceless [h̃] and voiced [ɺ̃], [w̃] and [j̃]~[ɲ]. An example is /bã́daʔre/ 'there's none', pronounced [mã́ⁿdaɺɛ].

/ʔ/, /h/ are labialized [ʔʷ], [hʷ] after a back vowel. In the sequence CV_{1}hV_{2}, where C is voiceless /p t k s/, V_{1} is devoiced in careful enunciation; at normal conversational speed it is elided entirely, resulting in a sequence CʰV_{2}, where C is aspirated [pʰ tʰ kʰ sʰ]. If the elided V_{1} is a back vowel and V_{2} is not, C may be labialized as well, though in almost all cases the two vowels are the same.

/w/ has a tendency to become [β] before front vowels ([β̃] or even [ṽ] when nasal); it may also be lightly fricated elsewhere. /j/ likewise may be fricated, or even an affricated [ᵈj] when not nasalized.

Non-nasal /r/ tends to [ɺ] when it occurs after a non-front vowel and before a front vowel, and to [ɾ] elsewhere: /ditárárí/ → [dìi̥táɺáɾí].

=== Vowels ===
Piratapuyo vowel phonemes
	Front	Central	Back
Close	i ĩ	ɨ ɨ̃ ⟨ʉ⟩	u ũ
Mid	ɛ ɛ̃		ɔ ɔ̃
Open		a ã	

Instead of positing six oral vowels and six nasal, the language has been analyzed as having a suprasegmental feature of nasalization that applies to all vowels and to all susceptible consonants in the word.

/ɛ ɛ̃/ have a high-mid allophone [e ẽ] that occurs before other vowels in hiatus and before velar consonants.

All vowels may be glottalized when followed by /ʔ/.

Devoicing of vowels is common. In the sequence C_{1}V̀C̥V́, where C̥ is a non-glottal voiceless consonant (that is, {p t k s}), and the first syllable has low tone and the second high/accented, C̥ is preaspirated: that is, the voicing of V̀ ends before the consonant begins. If the first consonant is also {p t k s}, the entire vowel may be devoiced in normal and especially in rapid speech.

=== Tones ===
There are two phonemic tones: high (accented) and non-high (mid or low). Successive high tones are each higher than the preceding. (See also pitch accent, downdrift.)

=== Phonotactics ===
Syllables may be up to CCVC, where the only initial consonant cluster is /st/ and the only final consonant is /ʔ/.

When syllable-final /ʔ/ is followed by [ɾ], [ɺ], [m] or [n], the two are sometimes separated by an epenthetic echo vowel.
