= Parimé River =

Coordinates: 3°34′N 63°47′W

Location
- Country: Brazil

Physical characteristics
- Source
  - location: Roraima state

The Parimé River is a river of Roraima state in northern Brazil.

== See also ==
- List of rivers of Roraima
- Lake Parime
