= Lawrence Kemys =

English seaman and companion of Sir Walter Raleigh

Lawrence Kemys or Keymis was an English seaman and companion of Sir Walter Raleigh in his expeditions to Guiana in 1595 and 1617–18.

== First voyage to Guiana ==
Raleigh's 1595 voyage to Trinidad and Guiana consisted of four vessels, with Kemys serving as second-in-command and captain of a small Spanish prize named Gallego. The aim of the expedition was to find Manõa, the mythic Gold city of El Dorado and to strike up friendly relations with native tribes. Upon reaching Guiana, Kemys led a force inland along the banks of the Essequibo River, reaching what he wrongly believed to be Lake Parime.

== Second voyage to Guiana ==
The next year, 1596, Raleigh being unable to go himself sent Kemys in command of the Darling to continue the exploration of the Guiana coast from a river he called "Shurinama" (actual Suriname River) to the Essequibo River. Kemys brought back glowing accounts of the wealth of the country he had visited, and urged on Raleigh that it would greatly advantage the queen Elizabeth I to take possession of it. Raleigh, however, was not in a position to follow the advice, and Kemys seems to have remained in his service on shore. During his exploration of the coast between the Amazon and the Orinoco, Kemys mapped the location of Amerindian tribes and prepared geographical, geological and botanical reports of the country. Kemys described the coast of Guiana in detail in his Relation of the Second Voyage to Guiana (1596) and wrote that indigenous people of Guiana traveled inland by canoe and land passages towards a large body of water on the shores of which he supposed was located Manoa of El Dorado.

== Imprisoned in the Tower ==
When, in 1603, Raleigh was accused of devising the so-called Main Plot against the King James I, Kemys, as his follower and servant, was also implicated, and was imprisoned with him in the Tower of London, and afterwards in the Fleet, September–December 1603. He was probably released at the end of the year, and during Raleigh's long imprisonment of thirteen years, seems to have acted as his bailiff and agent.

In 1617, Raleigh was pardoned by the King James I and it was no doubt that Kemys instigated Raleigh to demand the Royal permission to go on his last voyage to the Orinoco, and when the permission was at last granted, Kemys accompanied him as pilot and captain, claiming to have certain knowledge of a rich gold mine.

== Third voyage to Guiana ==
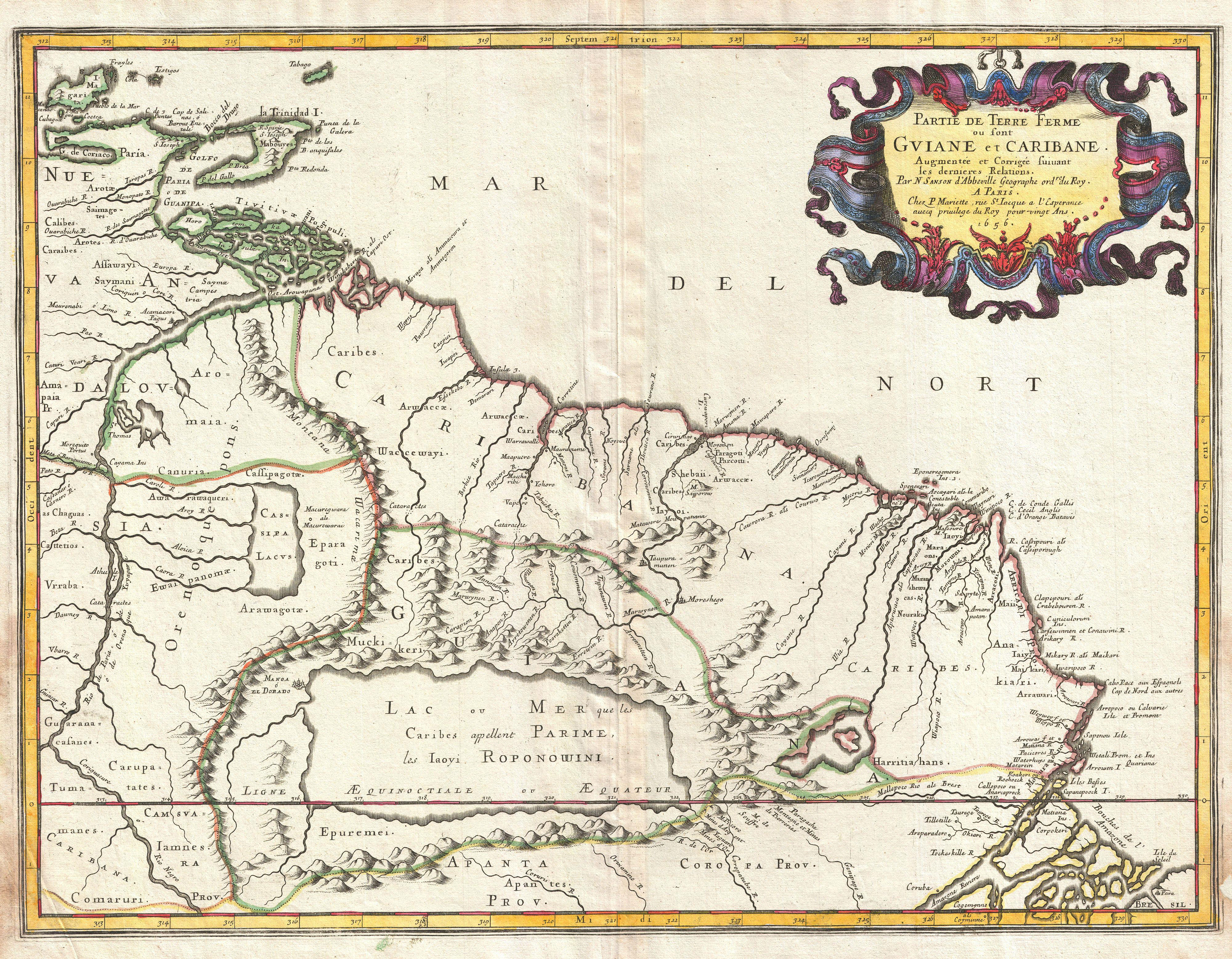
Map of Guayana lands (1656)

Kemys again sailed with Raleigh to Guiana in 1617, in search of gold with which Raleigh hoped to buy back royal favour. Kemys was instrumental in the sequence of events that led to the final downfall and execution of Raleigh after leading a party of Raleigh's men in an attack on the Spanish outpost of Santo Tomé de Guayana on the Orinoco River, against Raleigh's orders, and in violation of peace treaties signed by the King, James I, with Spain. Raleigh's son Walter was killed during the attack. A condition of Raleigh's release from the Tower of London in 1616 to undertake his mission to Guiana in search of gold deposits and the legendary city of El Dorado had been that he not attack or harass Spanish colonies or shipping. As Raleigh had been under a suspended death sentence for treason since 1603, the fact that men under his command had violated this order meant that James I would have had little option but to enforce this earlier sentence.

The sequence of events that led to Kemys' attack on Santo Tomé in January 1618 is unclear, with English and Spanish sources offering differing accounts of the incident, and each accusing the other of having fired the first shots, but it seems unlikely that Kemys intended the eventual result that transpired. Raleigh's son Walter was the first casualty of the brief skirmish, killed by a musket ball. One other Englishman and two Spaniards were also killed, before the Spanish garrison fled. Kemys' men found themselves in control of the town, but surrounded by hostile Spanish forces. Kemys sent out a few brief expeditions in search of the promised gold, but these were unsuccessful. After 29 days and failed attempts to negotiate with the Spanish, Kemys ordered Santo Tomé looted and burned. They set off back down the Orinoco to rejoin Raleigh and their fleet, finally arriving back there on 2 March.

== Death ==
Kemys had already informed Raleigh by letter of the unfolding disaster and the death of his son. He went to Raleigh's cabin to beg forgiveness, but found Raleigh unable to grant it to him. In Raleigh's words, "I told him that he had undone me by his obstinacy, and that I would not favour... in any sort his former follie." Kemys reportedly replied, "I know then, Sir, what course to take," before returning to his own cabin. Kemys then committed suicide by shooting himself in the chest with a pistol, then when that did not prove immediately fatal, stabbing himself in the heart with a knife.

On Raleigh's return to England, an outraged Count Gondomar, the Spanish ambassador, demanded that Raleigh's death sentence be reinstated by King James, who had little choice but to do so. Raleigh was brought to London from Plymouth by Sir Lewis Stukley, where he passed up numerous opportunities to make an effective escape. Raleigh was beheaded in the Old Palace Yard at the Palace of Westminster on 29 October 1618.

With the aggression of the Indians towards Spain, the Spanish never returned in force particularly and this allowed other European countries (France and Holland as well as England) to colonize the region at east of Esequibo river over the next two centuries with the creations of Dutch Guyana, French Guiana and eventually British Guyana.

Over time as more explorers came to the region Lake Parime's existence was definitively disproved in the early 19th century and there was a theory that the seasonal flooding of the Rupununi savannah may have been misidentified as such.
