= Kotiria =

Indigenous people of Brazil and Colombia

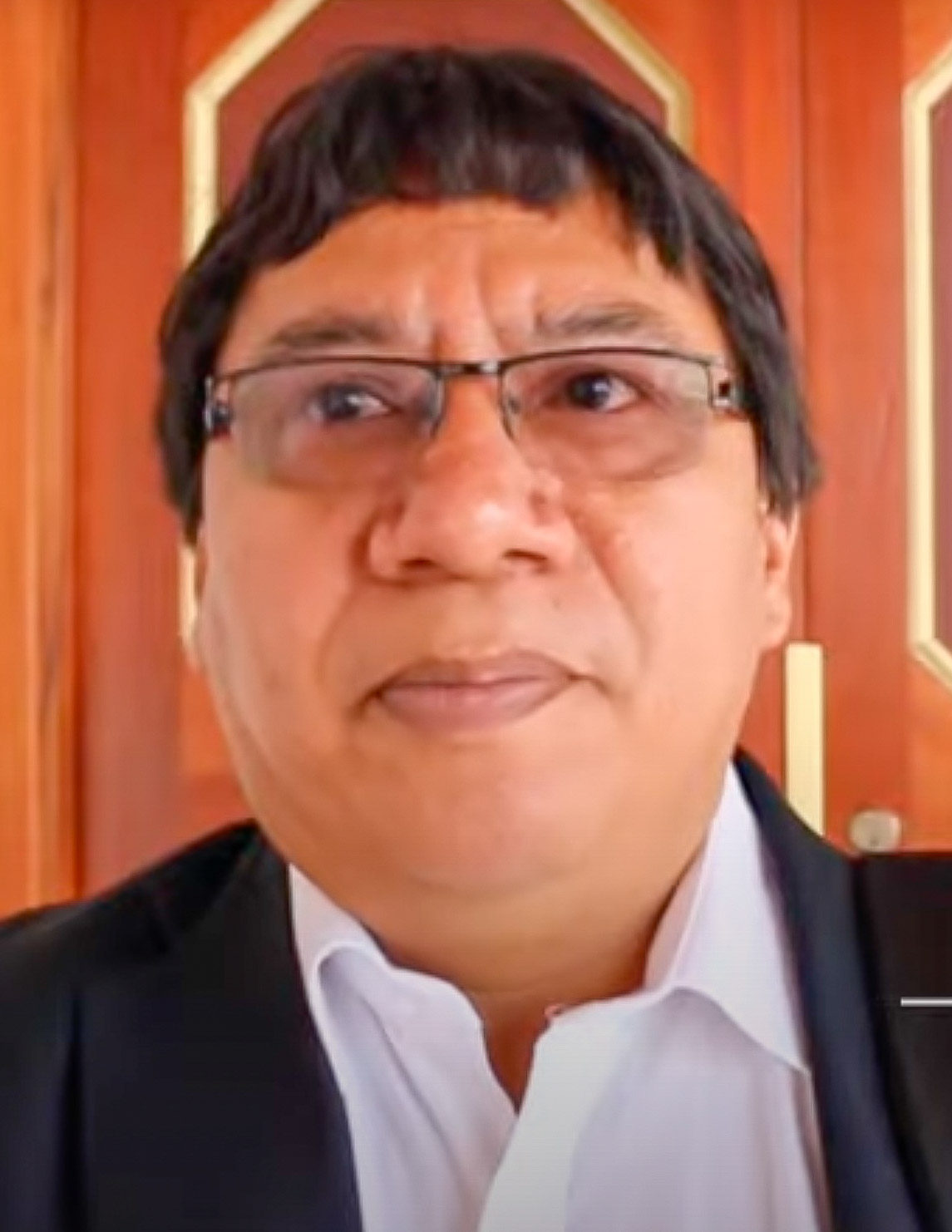
- Kotiria politician Julio César Estrada in 2014

Regions with significant populations
- Amazonas, Brazil (2005): 725
- Vaupés River, Colombia (2018): 3.312

Languages
- Kotiria language, Tucano language

The Kotiria are an Indigenous people of Brazil and Colombia, who speak a Tucanoan language.

== Geographic distribution ==
The Kotiria people live in northwestern Amazonia, on the Vaupés River. The diaspora of the Wanano people is spread between Brazil and Colombia, the total population is estimated at 1560, however the population in Brazil is estimated at 447. The number of speakers of the Kotiria language is quite high; it is still the first language of most of the population. It is seen as a healthy indigenous language.

== Early history ==
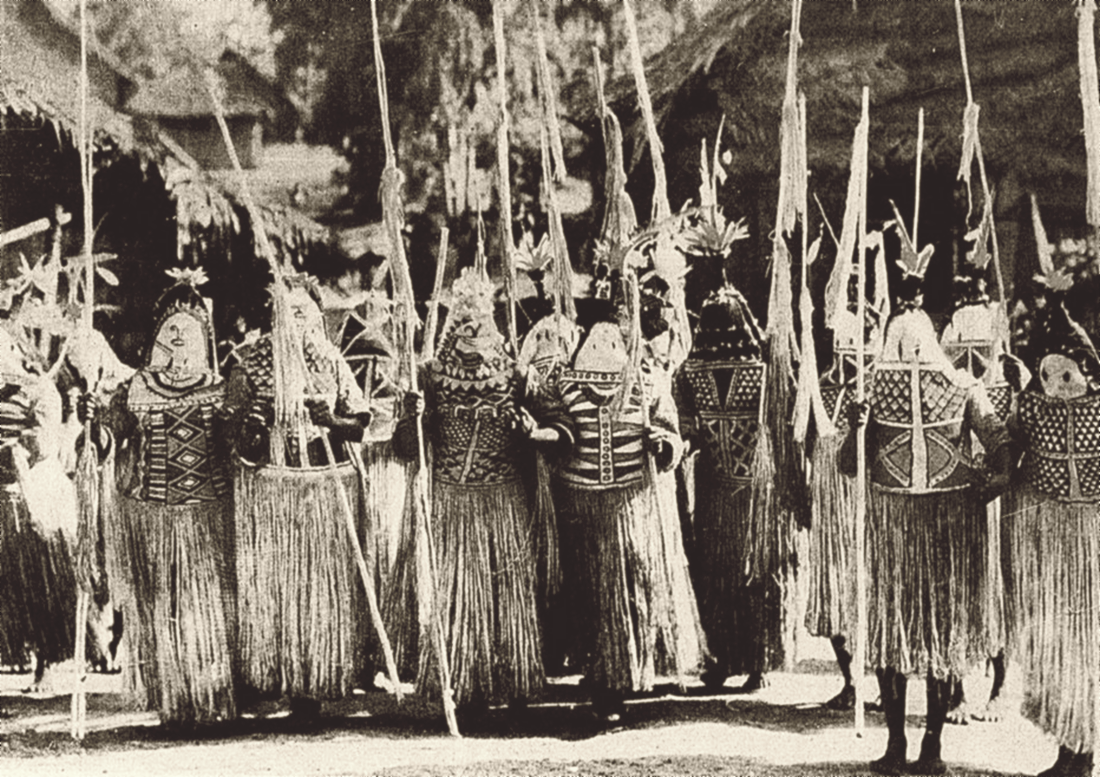
Dance of the Kotiria with masks in 1933

The Jesuits were the first ones to make their way into the area that is inhabited by the Kotiria people today. In the late 1700s they established their base in São Gabriel da Cachoeira. Missionary expeditions along with resettlement continued throughout the 1900s. Boarding schools were set up in larger settlements like São Gabriel and students were sent to study there. People from these missionaries would go into villages and encourage the indigenous peoples to abandon their beliefs and practice Christianity, along with speaking Portuguese.

The first documentation of the Kotiria people came from naturalist Alfred Wallace during his 1852 expedition along the Vaupés River. Later in 1904, the German ethnologist Theodor Koch-Grünberg conducted research in the Kotiria region. He observed their interactions with other indigenous groups, including ceremonies that included dance and burial practices. Something that has been noted by Dr. Kristine Stenzel in her research that is an important detail to include is the Wanano people are very multilingual.

Stenzel has also written articles regarding anthropological aspects of the Kotiria people (2010, 2013) as well in her 2004 dissertation where she discusses cultural aspects such as marriage and multilingualism. Anthropologist Janet Chernela has also studied the Kotiria society and published a book called “The Wanano Indians of the Brazilian Amazon” which takes a deeper look into Kotiria society.
