= Waʼikhana =

Indigenous people of Colombia and Brazil

Coordinates: 0.736873°N 69.467713°W

Pira-tapuya
Wa’îkɨ̃hɨ

Regions with significant populations
- Amazonas, Brazil (2014): 1,325
- Vaupés River, Colombia (1988): 400

Languages
- Piratapuyo

Related ethnic groups
- Wanano

The Pira-tapuya, or variations like Pira-Tapuia, Piratapuyo, etc., or Tapuya (Tucano: Wa’îkɨ̃hɨ) for short, are an Indigenous people of the Amazon regions. They live along the Vaupés River in Colombia and in the state of Amazonas, Brazil.

== Languages ==
Location of Teresita on the middle Papuri

The Pira-tapuya call themselves Waíkana. They speak the Piratapuyo language, one of the Eastern Tucanoan languages. Other ethnic groups in the region also speak Eastern Tucanoan languages apart from the Tariana people, who originally spoke an Arawakan language. The lingua franca of the region is the Tucano language, which has around 20,000 speakers.

== Locations ==
The Pira-tapuya live along the banks of the Vaupés River and its tributaries such as the Tiquié, Papurí and Querari rivers. The 1,375 kilometres (854 mi) Uaupés River rises in Colombia and flows for 845 kilometres (525 mi) to the border with Brazil. For over 188 kilometres (117 mi) it forms the border between Colombia and Brazil, then for 342 kilometres (213 mi) flows through Brazil to the point where it joins the Rio Negro. The main settlements are the town of Mitú, capital of the Vaupés Department in Colombia, and Iaraueté, seat of a district in the municipality of São Gabriel da Cachoeira.

The Pira-tapuya live in the middle Papuri in the vicinity of Teresita, and in the lower Uaupés. Some have migrated to other locations of Rio Negro and São Gabriel. As of 2014 Siasi/Sesai estimated that there were 1,325 Pira-tapuya in Amazonas. As of 1988 there were an estimated 400 Pira-tapuya in Colombia. The peoples of the region intermarry, trade, and engage in shared rituals, forming the Uaupés/Pira-Paraná socio-cultural complex.

== Sources ==
- Pira-tapuya (in Portuguese), ISA: Instituto Socioambiental
