= Pedra Pintada, Roraima =

Archaeological site in Brazil

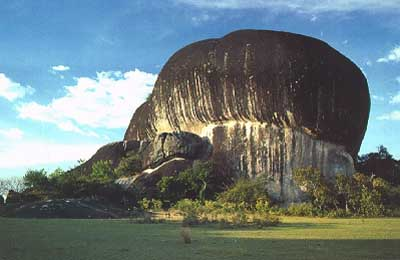
Pedra Pintada

The Pedra Pintada or "Painted Rock" is a large rock formation in the state of Roraima, Brazil. It is 85 metres (279 ft) long, 35 metres (115 ft) high and 30 metres (98 ft) wide, with a cave underneath. It is located on the Boa Vista savanna.

Rock art has been found on the walls of the cave as well as on the exterior of the rock, and the cave has yielded potsherds, axes, and beads.

The formation is within the San Marcos indigenous reserve, where Macuxi, Wapishana and Pemon indigenous peoples live.

== Archaeology ==
During a study and excavations between 1985 and 1987, Brazilian archaeologists came to the conclusion that the site was inhabited as far back as 2000 BC. They classified the rock art into two different styles: the abstract "Parime" and the realist "Surumu". The "Surumu" style is similar to the "Aishalton" style of the Caribbean Islands and the north of South America.
