= Arawakan languages =

Indigenous South American language family

Arawakan
- Maipurean
- Geographic distribution: South America, Central America, Caribbean
- Ethnicity: Arawakan peoples
- Linguistic classification: One of the world's primary language families
- Proto-language: Proto-Arawakan
- Subdivisions: Northern; Southern

Language codes
- ISO 639-5: awd
- Glottolog: araw1281
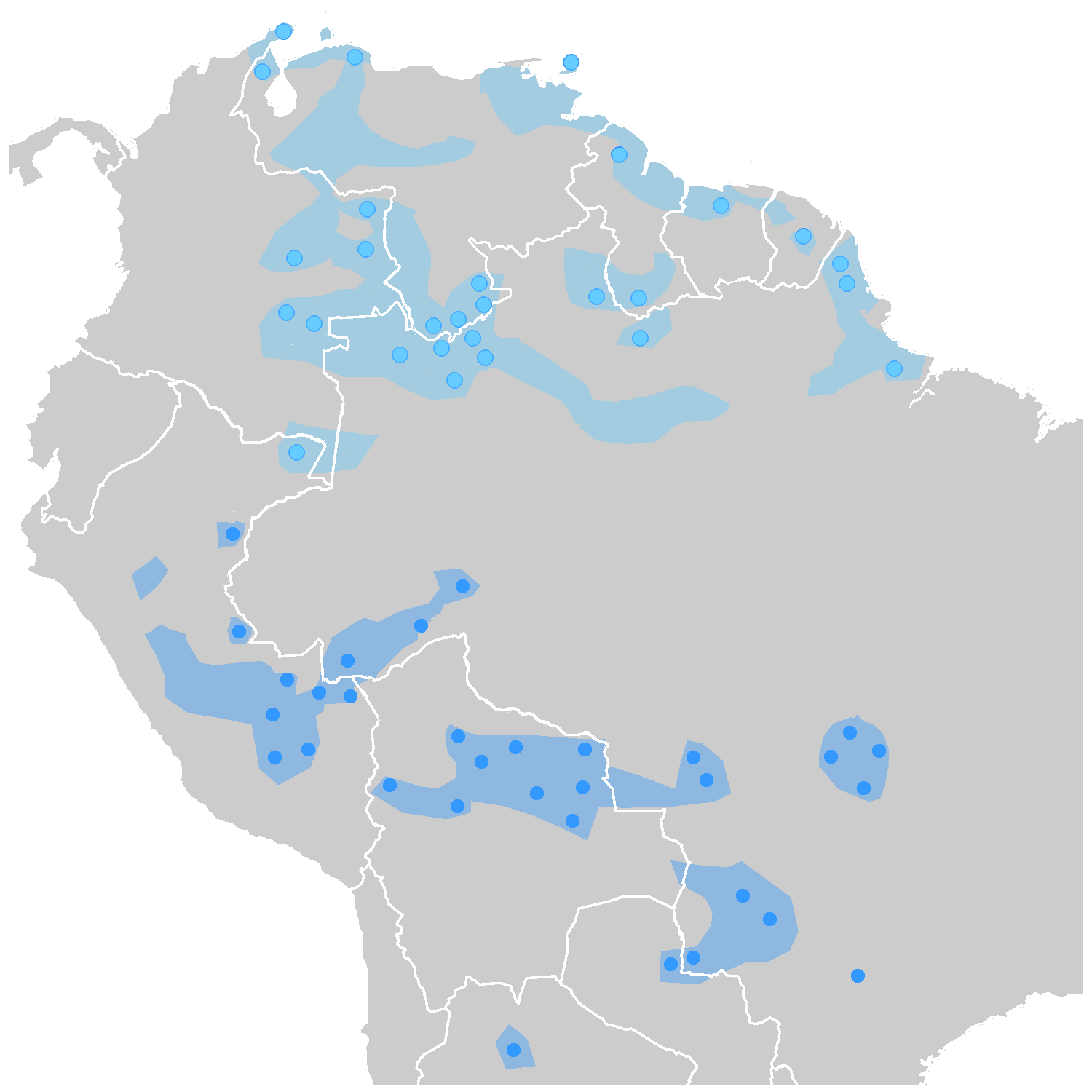
- Maipurean languages in South America (Caribbean and Central America not included): North-Maipurean (pale blue) and South-Maipurean (deeper blue). Spots represent location of extant languages, and shadowed areas show probable earlier locations.

Arawakan, also known as Maipurean (also Maipuran), is a language family spoken amongst various Indigenous peoples in South America. Branches migrated to Central America and the Greater Antilles and Lesser Antilles in the Caribbean and the Atlantic, including what is now the Bahamas. Most present-day South American countries are known to have been home to speakers of Arawakan languages, with the exceptions of Ecuador, Uruguay, and Chile.

== Name ==
The name Maipure was given to the family by Filippo S. Gilii in 1782, after the Maipure language of Venezuela, which he used as a basis of his comparisons. It was renamed after the culturally more important Arawak language a century later. The term Arawak took over (e.g. "Arawak languages"), until its use was extended by North American scholars to the broader Macro-Arawakan proposal. At that time, the name Maipurean was resurrected for the core family.

In 1783, the Italian priest Filippo Salvatore Gilii recognized the unity of the Maipure language of the Orinoco and Moxos of Bolivia; he named their family Maipure. It was renamed Arawak by Von den Steinen (1886) and Brinton (1891) after Arawak in the Guianas, one of the major languages of the family. The modern equivalents are Maipurean or Maipuran and Arawak or Arawakan.

The term Arawakan is now used in two senses. South American scholars use Aruák for the family demonstrated by Gilij and subsequent linguists. In North America, however, scholars have used the term to include a hypothesis adding the Guajiboan and Arawan families. In North America, scholars use the name Maipurean to distinguish the core family, which is sometimes called core Arawak(an) or Arawak(an) proper instead.

Kaufman (1990: 40) relates the following:

[The Arawakan] name is the one normally applied to what is here called Maipurean. Maipurean used to be thought to be a major subgroup of Arawakan, but all the living Arawakan languages, at least, seem to need to be subgrouped with languages already found within Maipurean as commonly defined. The sorting out of the labels Maipurean and Arawakan will have to await a more sophisticated classification of the languages in question than is possible at the present state of comparative studies.

== Dispersal ==
The Arawakan linguistic matrix hypothesis (ALMH) suggests that the modern diversity of the Arawakan language family stems from the diversification of a trade language or lingua franca that was spoken throughout much of tropical lowland South America. Proponents of this hypothesis include Santos-Granero (2002) and Eriksen (2014). Eriksen (2014) proposes that the Arawakan family had only broken up after 600 AD, but Michael (2020) considers this to be unlikely, noting that Arawakan internal diversity is greater than that of the Romance languages. On the other hand, Blench (2015) suggests a demographic expansion that had taken place over a few thousand years, similar to the dispersals of the Austronesian and Austroasiatic language families in Southeast Asia.

== Language contact ==
As one of the most geographically widespread language families in all of the Americas, Arawakan linguistic influence can be found in many language families of South America. Jolkesky (2016) notes that there are lexical similarities with the Arawa, Bora-Muinane, Guahibo, Harakmbet-Katukina, Harakmbet, Katukina-Katawixi, Irantxe, Jaqi, Karib, Kawapana, Kayuvava, Kechua, Kwaza, Leko, Macro-Jê, Macro-Mataguayo-Guaykuru, Mapudungun, Mochika, Mura-Matanawi, Nambikwara, Omurano, Pano, Takana, Puinave-Nadahup, Taruma, Tupi, Urarina, Witoto-Okaina, Yaruro, Zaparo, Saliba-Hodi, and Tikuna-Yuri language families due to contact. However, these similarities could be due to inheritance, contact, or chance.

== Languages ==
Classification of Maipurean is difficult because of the large number of Arawakan languages that are extinct and poorly documented. However, apart from transparent relationships that might constitute single languages, several groups of Maipurean languages are generally accepted by scholars. Many classifications agree in dividing Maipurean into northern and southern branches, but perhaps not all languages fit into one or the other. The three classifications below are accepted by all:

- Ta-Maipurean = Caribbean Arawak / Ta-Arawak = Caribbean Maipuran,
- Upper Amazon Maipurean = North Amazonian Arawak = Inland Maipuran,
- Central Maipurean = Pareci–Xingu = Paresí–Waurá = Central Maipuran,
- Piro = Purus,
- Campa = Pre-Andean Maipurean = Pre-Andine Maipuran.

An early contrast between Ta-Arawak and Nu-Arawak, depending on the prefix for "I", is spurious; nu- is the ancestral form for the entire family, and ta- is an innovation of one branch of the family.

=== Loukotka (1968) ===
Below is a full list of Arawakan language varieties listed by Loukotka (1968), including names of unattested varieties, but excluding the Guajiboan languages.

Arawakan language varieties listed by Loukotka (1968)

Island languages

- Taino / Nitaino - once spoken in the Conquest days on the Greater Antilles Islands of Cuba, Dominican Republic, Haiti, Puerto Rico and Jamaica. Dialects are:
  - Taino of Haiti and Quisqueya - extinct language of the island were Dominican Republic and the Republic of Haiti.
  - Taino of Cuba - once spoken on the island of Cuba; in the nineteenth century only in the villages of Jiguaní, Bayamo, and Quivicán; now the last descendants speak only Spanish.
  - Borinquen - once spoken on the island of Puerto Rico. (unattested)
  - Yamaye - once spoken on the island of Jamaica.
  - Lucaya - once spoken on the Bahamas Islands.
- Eyeri / Allouage - once spoken in the Lesser Antilles.
- Nepuya - spoken on the eastern part of the island of Trinidad.
- Naparina - once spoken on the island of Trinidad. (Unattested.)
- Caliponau - language spoken by the women of the Carib tribes in the Lesser Antilles.

Guiana language

- Arawak / Aruaqui / Luccumi / Locono - spoken in the Guianas. Dialects are:
  - Western - spoken in Guyana.
  - Eastern - spoken in French Guiana on the Curipi River and Oyapoque River.

Central group

- Wapishana / Matisana / Wapityan / Uapixana - spoken on the Tacutu River, Mahú River, and Surumú River, territory of Rio Branco, Brazil, and in the adjoining region in Guyana.
- Amariba - once spoken at the sources of the Tacutu River and Rupununi River, Guyana. (Unattested.)
- Atorai / Attaraye / Daurí - spoken between the Rupununi River and Kuyuwini River, Guyana.

Mapidian group

- Mapidian / Maotityan - spoken at the sources of the Apiniwau River, Guyana, now perhaps extinct.
- Mawakwa - once spoken on the Mavaca River, Venezuela.

Goajira group

- Goajira / Uáira - language spoken on the Goajira Peninsula in Colombia and Venezuela with two dialects, Guimpejegual and Gopujegual.
- Paraujano / Parancan / Parawogwan / Pará - spoken by a tribe of lake dwellers on Lake Maracaibo, Zulia state, Venezuela.
- Alile - once spoken on the Guasape River, state of Zulia, Venezuela. (Unattested.)
- Onota - once spoken between Lake Maracaibo and the Palmar River in the same region, Zulia state, Venezuela. (Unattested.)
- Guanebucán - extinct language once spoken on the Hacha River, department of Magdalena, Colombia. (Unattested.)
- Cosina / Coquibacoa - extinct language of a little known tribe of the Serranía Cosina, Goajira Peninsula, Colombia. (Unattested.)

Caquetío group

- Caquetío - extinct language once spoken on the islands of Curaçao and Aruba near the Venezuelan coast, on the Yaracuy River, Portuguesa River, and Apure River, Venezuela. (only several words)
- Ajagua - once spoken on the Tocuyo River near Carera, state of Lara, Venezuela. (only two words and patronyms.)
- Quinó - once spoken in the village of Lagunillas, state of Mérida, Venezuela. (Nothing.)
- Tororó / Auyama - once spoken in the village of San Cristóbal, state of Táchira. (Febres Cordero 1921, pp. 116–160 passim, only six words.)
- Aviamo - once spoken on the Uribante River, state of Táchira. (Unattested.)
- Tecua - once spoken on the Lengupa River and in the village of Teguas, department of Boyacá, Colombia. (Unattested.)
- Yaguai - once spoken on the Arichuna River, state of Apure, Venezuela. (Unattested.)
- Cocaima - once spoken between the Setenta River and Matiyure River, state of Apure, Venezuela. (Unattested.)
- Chacanta - once spoken on the Mucuchachi River, state of Mérida. (Unattested.)
- Caparo - once spoken on the Caparo River, Santander, Colombia. (Unattested.)
- Támud - once spoken northeast of the Sagamoso River, Santander, Colombia. (Unattested.)
- Burgua - once spoken near San Camilo on the Burgua River, Santander, Colombia. (Unattested.)
- Cuite - once spoken on the Cuite River, Santander, Colombia. (Unattested.)
- Queniquea - once spoken in the same hill region in Colombia on the Pereno River. (Unattested.)
- Chucuna - once spoken between the Manacacías River and Vichada River, territories of Meta and Vichada, Colombia. (Unattested.)
- Guayupe - spoken on the Güejar River and Ariari River, Meta territory.
- Sae - once spoken by the neighbors of the Guayupe tribe in the same region. (Unattested.)
- Sutagao - spoken once on the Pasca River and Sumapaz River, Meta territory. (Unattested.)
- Chocue / Choque - once spoken on the Herorú River and Guayabero River, Meta territory. (Unattested.)
- Eperigua - once spoken at the sources of the Güejar River and near San Juan de los Llanos, Meta territory. (Unattested.)
- Aricagua - once spoken in the state of Mérida, Venezuela. (Unattested.)
- Achagua - spoken on the Apure River and Arauca River in the department of Boyacá and territory of Meta, Colombia.
- Piapoco / Mitua / Dzáse - spoken on the Guaviare River, territory of Vaupés, Colombia.
- Cabere / Cabre - once spoken on the Teviare River and Zama River, Vichada territory.
- Maniba / Camaniba - spoken by a little known tribe that lived on the middle course of the Guaviare River, Vaupés territory, Colombia. (Unattested.)
- Amarizana - extinct language once spoken on the Vera River and Aguas Blancas River, territory of Meta.

Maypure group

- Maypure - extinct language once spoken in the village of Maipures, Vichada territory, Colombia. Inhabitants now speak only Spanish.
- Avani / Abane - once spoken on the Auvana River and Tipapa River, Amazonas territory, Venezuela. (Gilij 1780-1784, vol. 3, p. 383, only six words.)

Baniva group

- Baníva - language spoken on the Orinoco River, especially in the village of San Fernando de Atabapo, Amazonas territory, Venezuela.
- Yavitero / Pareni / Yavitano - spoken on the Atabapo River in the village of Yavita.

Guinau group

- Guinau / Inao / Guniare / Temomeyéme / Quinhau - once spoken at the sources of the Caura River and Merevari River, state of Bolívar, Venezuela, now perhaps extinct.

Baré group

- Baré / Ihini / Arihini - spoken on the Casiquiare River, territory of Amazonas, Venezuela, and on the upper course of the Negro River, state of Amazonas, Brazil.
- Uarequena - spoken on the Guainía River, Vaupés territory, Colombia.
- Adzáneni / Adyána / Izaneni - spoken at the sources of the Caiarí River and on the Apui River, frontier of Colombia and Brazil.
- Carútana / Corecarú / Yauareté-tapuya - spoken on the frontier between Colombia and Brazil on the Içana River.
- Katapolítani / Acayaca / Cadaupuritani - spoken on the Içana River in the village of Tunuhy, Brazil.
- Siusí / Ualíperi-dákeni / Uereperidákeni - spoken on the lower course of the Caiarí River and Içana River and on the middle course of the Aiari River, state of Amazonas, Brazil.
- Moriwene / Sucuriyú-tapuya - spoken on the Içana River in the village of Seringa Upita, state of Amazonas, Brazil.
- Mapanai / Ira-tapuya - spoken on the Içana River near Cachoeira Yandú, state of Amazonas.
- Hohodene / Huhúteni - spoken on the Cubate River, state of Amazonas.
- Maulieni / Káua-tapuya - spoken on the Aiari River, state of Amazonas.

Ipéca group

- Ipéca / Kumada-mínanei / Baniva de rio Içana - spoken on the Içana River near the village of San Pedro, frontier region of Brazil and Colombia.
- Payualiene / Payoariene / Pacu-tapuya - spoken in the same frontier region on the Arara-paraná River.
- Curipaco - spoken on the Guainía River, territory of Amazonas, Venezuela.
- Kárro - spoken in the territory of Amazonas on the Puitana River.
- Kapité-Mínanei / Coatí-tapuya - spoken at the sources of the Içana River, Vaupés territory, Colombia.

Tariana group

- Tariana / Yavi - spoken in the villages of Ipanoré and Yauareté on the Caiarí River, Vaupés Territory, Colombia.
- Iyäine / Kumandene / Yurupary-tapuya - spoken in the same region north of the Tariana tribe. Now only Tucano is spoken. (Unattested.)
- Cauyari / Acaroa / Cabuyarí - once spoken on the Cananari River and on the middle course of the Apaporis River, territory of Amazonas, Colombia. Now perhaps extinct.

Mandauáca group

- Mandauáca / Maldavaca - spoken on the Baria River, Capabury River, and Pasimoni River, Amazonas territory, Venezuela.
- Cunipúsana - once spoken in Amazonas territory on the Siapa River. (Unattested.)

Manáo group

- Manáo / Oremanao / Manoa - extinct language once spoken around the modern city of Manaus on the Negro River, state of Amazonas, Brazil.
- Arina - extinct language once spoken on the middle course of the Marauiá River, Amazonas state. (Unattested.)
- Cariay / Carihiahy - extinct language once spoken between the Negro River, Araçá River, and Padauari River, territory of Rio Branco, Brazil.
- Bahuana - spoken between the Padauari River and Araçá River. (Unattested.)
- Uaranacoacena - extinct language once spoken between the Branco River, Negro River, and Araçá River, Amazonas. (Unattested.)
- Arauaqui - extinct language once spoken between the Negro River and Uatuma River. A few descendants now speak only Lingua Geral or Portuguese. (Unattested.)
- Dapatarú - once spoken between the Uatuma River and Urubu River and on the island of Saracá, Amazonas. (Unattested.)
- Aniba - once spoken on the Aniba River and around Saracá lagoon. (Unattested.)
- Caboquena - once spoken on the Urubu River, Amazonas. (Unattested.)
- Caburichena - once spoken on the right bank of the Negro River. (Unattested.)
- Seden - once spoken between the Uatuma River and Negro River. (Unattested.)

Uirina group

- Uirina - extinct language once spoken at the sources of the Marari River, territory of Rio Branco.
- Yabaána / Jabâ-ana / Hobacana - language of a tribe in the territory of Rio Branco, on the Marauiá River and Cauaburi River.
- Anauyá - spoken by a little known tribe on the Castaño River, territory of Amazonas, Venezuela.

Chiriána group

- Chiriána / Barauána - spoken between the Marari River and Demini River, territory of Rio Branco.

Yukúna group

- Yukúna - spoken on the Miritíparaná River, Amazonas territory, Colombia.
- Matapí - spoken in the same region, Amazonas territory, near Campoamor. (Unattested.)
- Guarú / Garú - spoken on the Mamurá River, Cuama River, and Meta River, territory of Caquetá, Colombia.

Resigaro group

- Resigaro / Rrah~nihin / Rosigaro - spoken by a few families on the Igaraparaná River near Casa Arana.

Araicú group

- Marawa / Maragua - spoken in the nineteenth century between the Juruá River and Jutai River, now in a single village at the mouth of the Juruá River, Amazonas.

Araicú group

- Araicú / Waraikú - extinct language once spoken at the sources of the Jandiatuba River and on the right bank of the Jutai River, Amazonas.

Uainumá group

- Uainumá / Ajuano / Wainumá / Inabishana / Uainamby-tapuya / Uaypi - extinct language once spoken on the Upi River, a tributary of the Içá River, Amazonas.
- Mariaté / Muriaté - extinct language once spoken at the mouth of the Içá River.

Jumana group

- Jumana / Shomana - extinct language once spoken on the Puruê River and Juami River, Amazonas state.
- Passé / Pazé - extinct language once spoken between the Negro River, Japurá River, and Içá River. The few descendants now speak only Portuguese.

Cauishana group

- Cauishana / Kayuishana / Noll-hína - now spoken by a few families on the Tocantins River and on Lake Mapari, Amazonas.
- Pariana - extinct language once spoken on the middle course of the Marauiá River. (Unattested.)

Pre-Andine group

- Campa / Anti / Atzíri / Thampa / Kuruparia - spoken on the Urubamba River and Ucayali River, department of Cuzco, Peru.
- Machiganga / Ugunichire / Mashigango - spoken in the department of Cuzco on the Mantaro River, Apurimac River, Urubamba River, and Paucartambo River. Dialects are:
  - Chanchamayo - spoken on the Perené River.
  - Catongo - spoken on the Tambo River.
  - Machiringa - spoken on the Apurimac River and Ene River. (Unattested.)
- Piro / Simirinche - spoken in the department of Loreto on the Inuya River.
- Chontaquiro - spoken on the Iaco River, Caeté River, and Chandless River, territory of Acre, Brazil.
- Mashco / Sirineiri / Moeno - spoken on the Pilcopata River, department of Madre de Dios, Peru.
- Curia - spoken on the Murú River and Embira River, Acre, now perhaps extinct. (Unattested.)
- Quirineri - spoken on the Paucartambo River and Manu River, department of Cuzco (Oppenheim 1948).
- Maneteneri - extinct language from the Purus River, Aquirí River, Caspatá River, and Araçá River, Acre territory.
- Inapari / Mashco Piro - spoken between the Tacutimani River and Amigo River, department of Madre de Dios, now perhaps extinct.
- Huachipairi - extinct language once spoken on the Cosñipata River and Pilcopata River, department of Madre de Dios.
- Kushichineri / Cushitineri - spoken in Acre territory on the Curumaha River by a small tribe.
- Cuniba - extinct language once spoken between the Juruazinho River and Jutaí River and on the Mapuá River, state of Amazonas.
- Puncuri - spoken on the Puncuri River, Acre. (Unattested.)
- Kanamare / Canamirim - spoken in the same territory on the Acre, Irariapé River and Abuña River, now probably extinct.
- Epetineri - once spoken on the Pijiria River, tributary of the Urubamba River, Peru. (Unattested.)
- Pucapucari - once spoken on the Camisia River and Tunquini River, Peru. (Unattested.)
- Tucurina - spoken by a few individuals on the Igarapé Cuchicha River, a tributary of the Chandless River, Acre. (Unattested.)

Ipurina group

- Ipurina / Apurinã / Kangiti - spoken along the Purus River from the mouth of the Sepatiní River to the mouth of the Yaco River, Amazonas.
- Casharari - spoken by a little known tribe inhabiting the tropical forests between the Abuña River and Ituxí River and on the tributaries, Curequeta River and Iquirí River, in Acre. (Unattested.)

Apolista group

- Apolista / Lapachu / Aguachile - extinct language once spoken in the old mission of Apolobamba, province of La Paz, Bolivia.

Mojo group

- Mojo / Ignaciano / Morocosi - spoken on the Mamoré River and on the plains of Mojos, Beni province, Bolivia.
- Baure / Chiquimiti - spoken on the Blanco River and around the city of Baures in the same region.
- Muchojeone - extinct language once spoken at the old mission El Carmen in Beni province, Bolivia.
- Suberiono - extinct language once spoken west of the Mamoré River and the Guapay River, Bolivia. (Unattested.)
- Pauna - extinct language once spoken at the sources of the Baures River, Santa Cruz province, Bolivia.
- Paicone - extinct language from the sources of the Paragúa River, Santa Cruz province, Bolivia.

Paresi group

- Sarave / Zarabe - spoken on the Verde River and Paragúa River, Santa Cruz province, Bolivia, now perhaps extinct.
- Parecí / Arití / Maimbari / Mahibarez - language with dialects:
  - Caxinití - spoken on the Sumidouro River, Sepotuba River, and Sucuriú River, Mato Grosso, Brazil.
  - Waimaré - spoken in Mato Grosso on the Verde River and Timalatía River.
  - Kozariní / Pareci-Cabixi - spoken in Mato Grosso on the Juba River, Cabaçal River, Jaurú River, Guaporé River, Verde River, Papagaio River, Burití River, and Juruena River.
  - Uariteré - spoken on the Pimenta Bueno River, territory of Rondônia. (Unattested.)

Chané group

- Chané / Izoceño - formerly spoken on the Itiyuro River, Salta province, Argentina, but now the tribe speaks only a language of the Tupi stock and the old language serves only for religious ceremonies. (only a few words.)
- Guaná / Layano - once spoken on the Yacaré River and Galván River, Paraguay, now on the Miranda River, Mato Grosso, Brazil.
- Terena - spoken in Mato Grosso on the Miranda River and Jijui River.
- Echoaladí / Choarana - extinct language once spoken in Mato Grosso. (Unattested.)
- Quiniquinao / Equiniquinao - once spoken near Albuquerque, now by only a few families on the Posto Cachoeirinha near Miranda, Mato Grosso do Sul.

Waurá group

- Waurá - spoken on the Batoví River (a tributary of the Xingú River) Mato Grosso.
- Kustenáu - spoken in the same region, Mato Grosso, on the Batoví River and Jatobá River
- Yaulapíti / Yawarapiti / Ualapiti - spoken between the Meinacu River and Curisevú River, Mato Grosso.
- Mehináku / Meinacu / Mináko - spoken between the Batoví River and Curisevú River.
- Agavotocueng - spoken by an unknown tribe between the Curisevú River and Culuene River. (Unattested.)

Marawan group

- Marawan / Maraon - spoken on the Oiapoque River and Curipi River, Amapá territory.
- Caripurá / Karipuere - spoken in Amapá territory on the Urucauá River.
- Palicur / Parikurú - once spoken on the middle course of the Calçoene River and on the upper course of the Casipore River, now on the Urucauá River in Amapá territory.
- Caranariú - once spoken on the Urucauá River, now extinct. (Unattested.)
- Tocoyene - once spoken in Amapá territory on the Uanarí River. (Unattested.)
- Macapá - once spoken on the Camopi River and Yaroupi River, French Guiana, later on the upper course of the Pará River, state of Pará, Brazil; now perhaps extinct. (Unattested.)
- Tucujú - once spoken on the Jarí River, territory of Amapá, now perhaps extinct. (Unattested.)
- Mapruan - once spoken on the Oiac River, territory of Amapá. (Unattested.)

Aruan group

- Aruan / Aroã - originally spoken on the north coast of Marajó Island, Pará, later on the Uaçá River, Amapá territory. A few descendants now speak a French creole dialect.
- Sacaca - extinct language once spoken in the eastern part of Marajó Island.

Moríque group

- Moríque / Mayoruna - spoken on the border of Brazil and Peru, on the Javarí River.

Chamicuro group

- Chamicuro - spoken on the Chamicuro River, department of Loreto, Peru.
- Chicluna - extinct language once spoken in the same region east of the Aguano tribe. (Unattested.)
- Aguano / Awáno - extinct language of a tribe that lived on the lower course of the Huallaga River. The descendants, in the villages of San Lorenzo, San Xavier, and Santa Cruz, now speak only Quechua. (Unattested.)
- Maparina - once spoken in the same region on the lower course of the Ucayali River and at the old mission of Santiago. (Unattested.)
- Cutinana - once spoken on the Samiria River, Loreto. (Unattested.)
- Tibilo - once spoken in San Lorenzo village, Loreto region. (Unattested.)

Lorenzo group

- Amoishe / Amlsha / Amuescha / Amage / Lorenzo - once spoken on the Paucartambo River and Colorado River, department of Cuzco, Peru; now mainly Quechua is spoken.
- Chunatahua - once spoken at the mouth of the Chinchao River, department of Huánuco, Peru. (Unattested.)
- Panatahua - spoken in the same region on the right bank of the Huallaga River between Coyumba and Monzón, now perhaps extinct. (Unattested.)
- Chusco - once spoken in the same region as Panatahua near Huánuco. (Unattested.)

=== Kaufman (1994) ===
The following (tentative) classification is from Kaufman (1994: 57-60). Details of established branches are given in the linked articles. In addition to the family tree detailed below, there are a few languages that are "Non-Maipurean Arawakan languages or too scantily known to classify" (Kaufman 1994: 58), which include these:

- Shebaye (†)
- Lapachu (†)
- Morique (also known as Morike) (†)

Another language is also mentioned as "Arawakan":

- Salumã (also known as Salumán, Enawené-Nawé)

Including the unclassified languages mentioned above, the Maipurean family has about 64 languages. Out of them, 29 languages are now extinct: Wainumá, Mariaté, Anauyá, Amarizana, Jumana, Pasé, Cawishana, Garú, Marawá, Guinao, Yavitero, Maipure, Manao, Kariaí, Waraikú, Yabaána, Wiriná, Aruán, Taíno, Kalhíphona, Marawán-Karipurá, Saraveca, Custenau, Inapari, Kanamaré, Shebaye, Lapachu, and Morique.

- Maipurean
  - Northern Maipurean
    - Upper Amazon branch
    - Maritime branch
      - Aruán (Aruã) †
      - Wapixana (also known as Wapishana): Atorada (also known as Atoraí), Mapidian (also known as Maopidyán), Wapishana
      - Ta-Maipurean
      - Palikur
        - Palikur (also known as Palikúr)
        - Marawán †
  - Southern Maipurean
    - Western branch
      - Amuesha (also known as Amoesha, Yanesha')
      - Chamicuro (also known as Chamikuro)†
    - Central branch
    - Southern Outlier branch
      - Terêna (dialects: Kinikinao, Terena, Guaná, Chané)
      - Moxos group (also known as Moho)& Trinitario)
        - Baure
        - Paunaka (also known as Pauna–Paikone)
      - Piro group
    - Campa branch (also known as Pre-Andean)

Kaufman does not report the extinct Magiana of the Moxos group.

=== Aikhenvald (1999) ===
Apart from minor decisions on whether a variety is a language or a dialect, changing names, and not addressing several poorly attested languages, Aikhenvald departs from Kaufman in breaking up the Southern Outlier and Western branches of Southern Maipurean. She assigns Salumã and Lapachu ('Apolista') to what is left of Southern Outlier ('South Arawak'); breaks up the Maritime branch of Northern Maipurean, though keeping Aruán and Palikur together; and is agnostic about the sub-grouping of the North Amazonian branch of Northern Maipurean.

The following breakdown uses Aikhenvald's nomenclature followed by Kaufman's:

- Maipurean
  - North Arawak = Northern Maipurean
    - Rio Branco = Kaufman's Wapishanan (2) [with Mapidian under the name "Mawayana" and Mawakwa as a possible dialect]
    - Palikur = Kaufman's Palikur + Aruán (3)
    - Caribbean = Ta-Maipurean (8) [incl. Shebaye]
    - North Amazonian = Upper Amazon (17 attested)
  - South and South-Western Arawak = Southern Maipurean
    - South Arawak = Terena + Kaufman's Moxos group + Salumã + Lapachu ['Apolista'] (11)
    - Pareci–Xingu = Central Maipurean (6)
    - South-Western Arawak = Piro (5)
    - Campa (6)
    - Amuesha (1)
    - Chamicuro (1)

Aikhenvald classifies Kaufman's unclassified languages apart from Morique. She does not classify 15 extinct languages which Kaufman had placed in various branches of Maipurean.

Aikhenvald (1999:69) classifies Mawayana with Wapishana together under a Rio Branco branch, giving for Mawayana also the names "Mapidian" and "Mawakwa" (with some reservations for the latter).

=== Walker & Ribeiro (2011) ===
Walker & Ribeiro (2011), using Bayesian computational phylogenetics, classify the Arawakan languages as follows.

- Arawakan
  - Northeast
  - - South
    - - Western Amazonia
      - - Amuesha, Chamicuro
        - - Circum-Caribbean
          - - Central Brazil
            - - Central Amazonia
              - Northwest Amazonia

The internal structures of each branch is given below. Note that the strictly binary splits are a result of the Bayesian computational methods used.

- Arawakan
  - Northeast
    - Marawan, Palikúr
  - South
    - Kinikinau, Terena
      - Baure
      - Moxos: Trinitario, Ignaciano
  - Western Amazonia
      - Apurinã
        - Iñapari
        - Piro, Manxineri
      - Caquinte
        - Asheninka
          - Machiguenga, Nomatsiguenga
  - Amuesha, Chamicuro
  - Circum-Caribbean
    - Waraicu, Marawa
    - (Core branch)
      - (Island branch)
        - Taíno
        - Island Carib, Garífuna
      - Lokono
      - Paraujano, Guajiro
  - Central Brazil
      - Saraveka
      - Enawene Mawe, Paresí
      - Yawalapití
      - Waurá, Mehináku
  - Central Amazonia
      - Anauyá
      - Guinau, Baré
      - Bahuana, Manao
        - Arua
          - Cabiai
          - Mawayana, Wapixana
  - Northwest Amazonia
      - Maipure
        - Yavitero
        - Baniva, Warekena
      - Pasé, Yumana
        - Resígaro
        - Cabiyari
          - Kauixana
            - Yukuna
            - Mariaté, Wainumá
        - Achagua, Piapoco
          - Mandawaka, Guarekena
            - Tariana
              - Kurripako
              - Baniwa, Karutana

=== Jolkesky (2016) ===
Internal classification by Jolkesky (2016):

(† = extinct)

- Arawak
  - Yanesha
  - Western
    - Aguachile †
    - Chamikuro
    - Mamoré-Paraguai
      - Mamoré-Guaporé (Portuguese article)
        - Mojo-Paunaka
          - Mojo: Ignaciano; Trinitario
          - Paunaka
        - Baure-Paikoneka
          - Baure: Baure; Joaquiniano; Muxojeone †
          - Paikoneka †
      - Terena: Chane †; Guana †; Kinikinau; Terena
    - Negro-Putumayo
      - Jumana-Pase: Jumana †; Pase †
      - Kaishana †
      - Nawiki
        - Kabiyari
        - Karu-Tariana
          - Karu: Baniwa; Kuripako
          - Tariana
        - Mepuri †
        - Piapoko-Achagua: Achagua; Piapoko
        - Wainambu †
        - Warekena-Mandawaka: Warekena; Mandawaka †
        - Yukuna-Wainuma: Mariate †; Wainuma †; Yukuna
      - Resigaro
      - Wirina †
    - Orinoco
      - Yavitero-Baniva: Baniva; Yavitero †
      - Maipure †
    - Pre-Andine
      - Ashaninka-Nomatsigenga
        - Nomatsigenga
        - Machiguenga-Nanti
        - Ashaninka-Kakinte
          - Kakinte
          - Ashaninka-Asheninka
            - Ashaninka: Ashaninka
            - Asheninka: Asheninka Pajonal; Asheninka Perene; Asheninka Pichis; Asheninka Ucayali; Ashininka
    - Purus
      - Apurinã
      - Iñapari
      - Piro-Manchineri: Kanamare †; Kuniba †; Manchineri; Mashko Piro; Yine
  - Eastern
    - Lower Amazon
      - Atlantic: Marawan †; Palikur
      - Guaporé-Tapajós
        - Saraveka †
        - Tapajós: Enawene-Nawe; Paresi
      - Xingu
        - Kustenau †
        - Waura-Mehinako: Mehinaku; Waura
        - Yawalapiti
      - Waraiku: Waraiku †
    - Solimões-Caribbean: Marawan †; Palikur
      - Marawa †
      - Caribbean
        - Kaketio †
        - Wayuu-Añun
          - Añun
          - Wayuu
        - Lokono-Iñeri
          - Iñeri: Garifuna; Kalhiphona †
          - Lokono
        - Shebayo †
        - Taino †
      - Negro-Branco
        - Arua †
        - Mainatari †
        - Negro
          - Bare-Guinao: Bare; Guinao †
          - Bawana-Kariai-Manao: Bawana †; Kariai †; Manao †
          - Yabaana †
        - Branco
          - Mawayana
          - Wapishana-Parawana: Aroaki †; Atorada; Parawana †; Wapishana

=== Nikulin & Carvalho (2019) ===
Internal classification by Nikulin & Carvalho (2019: 270):

- Arawakan
  - Yanesha'
  - Chamicuro
  - Palikur
  - Maritime
    - Island Carib; Garífuna
    - Lokono; Wayuunaiki, Añun
  - Rio Branco
    - Wapixana
    - Mawayana
  - Japurá-Colômbia
    - Piapoco
    - Achagua
    - Yucuna
    - Resígaro
    - Tariana
    - Baniwa-Koripako
    - Warekena Antigo
  - Orinoco
    - Baré
    - Yavitero
    - Baniva of Guainia
    - Maipure
    - Warekena of Xié
  - Central
    - Paresí
    - Enawenê-Nawê
    - Xingu
      - Yawalapití
      - Waurá; Mehináku
  - Purus
    - Apurinã
    - Iñapari; Yine/Manxinéru
  - Campa
    - Nomatsiguenga
    - Matsiguenga
    - Nanti
    - Caquinte
    - Asháninka
    - Ashéninka
  - Bolívia-Paraná
    - Baure; Carmelito; Joaquiniano
    - Terena; Paunaka; Mojeño (Trinitário, Ignaciano, Loretano, Javeriano)

Phonological innovations characterizing some of the branches:

- Maritime: loss of medial Proto-Arawakan *-n-.
  - Lokono-Wayuu: first person singular prefix *ta- replacing *nu-. Carvalho also reconstructs the suffix *-ja (possibly a deictic) and *kabɨnɨ 'three' as characteristic of this subgroup.
- Campa: lexical innovations such as *iNʧato 'tree', *-taki 'bark', *-toNki 'bone', etc. There are also typological innovations due to contact with Andean languages such as Quechua.

=== Ramirez (2020) ===
The internal classification of Arawakan by Henri Ramirez (2020) is as follows. This classification differs quite substantially from his previous classification (Ramirez 2001), but is very similar to the one proposed by Jolkesky (2016).

12 subgroups consisting of 56 languages (29 living and 27 extinct) († = extinct)

- Arawakan
  - Japurá-Colombia (Portuguese article)
    - † Mepuri
    - † Yumana–Passé
      - † Yumana
      - † Passé
    - † Kauixana
    - Peripheral
      - † Mandawaka, Warekena (do San Miguel); Baniwa-Koripako
      - Piapoco, Achagua; Kabiyari
      - † Resígaro
      - † Wainumá-Mariaté
      - Yukuna
  - Upper Orinoco
    - Baniva de Maroa
    - † Pareni-Yavitero
    - † Maipure
  - Central-Amazon-Antilles ? (probable branch)
    - Amazon-Antilles
      - Guajiro, † Paraujano
      - † Taino, Iñeri, Loko, † Marawá
      - ? † Waraiku
      - ? † Wirina
    - Middle Rio Negro
      - † Baré
      - † Guinau
      - † Anauyá; † Mainatari, † Yabahana
    - Central
      - † Bahuana; † Manao, † Cariaí
      - † Aruã
      - Pidjanan
        - † Mawayana
        - Wapixana, † Parawana, † Aroaqui
      - ? † Shebayo
  - Mato Grosso-Palikur ? (probable branch)
    - Amapá
      - Palikur
    - Mato Grosso
      - Xingu
        - Waurá
        - Yawalapiti
      - Xaray
        - Salumã
        - Pareci
        - † Sarave
  - Bolivia-Purus-Kampa-(Amuesha) ? (probable branch)
    - Bolivia
      - Baure
      - Pauna; Mojeño, Tereno
    - Purus
      - † Iñapari
      - Piro
      - Apurinã
      - † Cararí
    - Pre-Andine
      - Kampa
    - Pozuzo
      - Amuesha
  - Lower Ucayali
    - † Chamicuro
    - ? † Moríque

== Characteristics ==
The languages called Arawakan or Maipurean were originally recognized as a separate group in the late nineteenth century. Almost all the languages now called Arawakan share a first-person singular prefix nu-, but Arawak proper has ta-. Other commonalities include a second-person singular pi-, relative ka-, and negative ma-.

The Arawak language family, as constituted by L. Adam, at first by the name of Maypure, has been called by Von den Steinen "Nu-Arawak" from the prenominal prefix nu- for the first person. This is common to all the Arawak tribes scattered along the coasts from Suriname to Guyana.

Upper Paraguay has Arawakan-language tribes: the Quinquinaos, the Layanas, etc. (This is the Moho-Mbaure group of L. Quevedo). In the Marajó Archipelago, in the middle of the estuary of the Amazon, the Aruã people spoke an Arawak dialect. The Guajira Peninsula (north of Venezuela and Colombia) is occupied by the Wayuu tribe, also Arawakan speakers. In 1890–95, De Brette estimated a population of 3,000 persons in the Guajira peninsula.

C. H. de Goeje's published vocabulary of 1928 outlines the Lokono/Arawak (Suriname and Guyana) 1400 items, comprising mostly morphemes (stems, affixes) and morpheme partials (single sounds), and only rarely compounded, derived, or otherwise complex sequences; and from Nancy P. Hickerson's British Guiana manuscript vocabulary of 500 items. However, most entries which reflect acculturation are direct borrowings from one or another of three model languages (Spanish, Dutch, English). Of the 1400 entries in de Goeje, 106 reflect European contact; 98 of these are loans. Nouns which occur with the verbalizing suffix described above number 9 out of the 98 loans.

== Phonology ==
Though a great deal of variation can be found from language to language, the following is a general composite statement of the consonants and vowels typically found in Arawak languages, according to Aikhenvald (1999):

		Labial	Dental	Alveolar	Lamino-(alveo)- palatal	Velar	Glottal
Stop	voiced	(b)	d			ɡ	
Stop	voiceless	p	t			k	(ʔ)
Stop	voiceless aspirated	(pʰ)	(tʰ)			(kʰ)	
Affricate				ts	tʃ		
Fricative		(ɸ)		s	ʃ		h
Lateral					l		
Vibrant					r		
Nasal		m		n	ɲ		
Glide		w			j		

	Front	Central	Back
High	i iː	ɨ ɨː	u uː
Mid		e eː	
Low		a aː	

For more detailed notes on specific languages see Aikhenvald (1999) pp. 76–77.

== Shared morphological traits ==
=== General morphological type ===
Arawakan languages are polysynthetic and mostly head-marking. They have fairly complex verb morphology. Noun morphology is much less complex and tends to be similar across the family. Arawakan languages are mostly suffixing, with just a few prefixes.

=== Alienable and inalienable possession ===
Arawakan languages tend to distinguish alienable and inalienable possession. A feature found throughout the Arawakan family is a suffix (whose reconstructed Proto-Arawakan form is /*-tsi/) that allows the inalienable (and obligatorily possessed) body-part nouns to remain unpossessed. This suffix essentially converts inalienable body-part nouns into alienable nouns. It can only be added to body-part nouns and not to kinship nouns (which are also treated as inalienable). An example from the Pareci language is given below:

no-tiho
1SG-face
my face

tiho-ti
face-ALIEN
(someone's) face

=== Classifiers ===
Many Arawakan languages have a system of classifier morphemes that mark the semantic category of the head noun of a noun phrase on most other elements of the noun phrase. The example below is from the Tariana language, in which classifier suffixes mark the semantic category of the head noun on all elements of a noun phrase other than the head noun (including adjectives, numerals, demonstratives, possessives) and on the verb of the clause:

ha-dapana pa-dapana na-tape-dapana na-ya-dapana hanu-dapana heku na-ni-ni-dapana-mahka
DEM.INAN-CL:HOUSE one-CL:HOUSE 3PL-medicine-CL:HOUSE 3PL-POSS-CL:HOUSE big-CL:HOUSE wood 3PL-make-TAV-CL:HOUSE-REC.PST.NVIS
‘This one big hospital of theirs has been made of wood’

=== Subject and object cross-referencing on the verb ===
Most Arawakan languages have split-intransitive alignment systems of subject and object cross-referencing on the verb. The agentive arguments of both transitive and intransitive verbs are marked with prefixes, whereas the patientive arguments of both transitive and intransitive verbs are marked with suffixes. The following example from Baniwa of Içana shows a typical Arawakan split-intransitive alignment:

ri-kapa-ni
3SG.NFEM.AG-see-3SG.NFEM.PAT
'He sees him/it.'

ri-emhani
3SG.NFEM.AG-walk
'He walks.'

hape-ka-ni
be.cold-DECL-3SG.NFEM.PAT
'He/it is cold.'

The prefixes and suffixes used for subject and object cross-referencing on the verb are stable throughout the Arawakan languages, and can therefore be reconstructed for Proto-Arawakan. The table below shows the likely forms of Proto-Arawakan:

	Prefixes (mark agent)		Suffixes (mark patient)	
person	SG	PL	SG	PL
1	*nu- or *ta-	*wa-	*-na, *-te	*-wa
2	*(p)i-	*(h)i-	*-pi	*-hi
3NFEM	*ri-, *i-	*na-	*-ri, *-i	*-na
3FEM	*thu-, *u-	*na-	*-thu, *-u	*-na
impersonal	*pa-			
non-focused agent	*i-, *a-			
dummy patient			*-ni	

== Some examples ==
The Arawak word for maize is marisi, and various forms of this word are found among the related languages:

Lokono, marisi, Guyana.
Taíno, mahisi or mahis, Greater Antilles.
Cauixana, mazy, Rio Jupura.
Wayuu, maiki, Goajira Peninsula.
Passes, mary, Lower Jupura.
Wauja, mainki, Upper Xingu River.

== Geographic distribution ==
Arawak is the largest family in the Americas with the respect to number of languages. The Arawakan languages are spoken by peoples occupying a large swath of territory, from the eastern slopes of the central Andes Mountains in Peru and Bolivia, across the Amazon basin of Brazil, northward into Suriname, Guyana, French Guiana, Venezuela, Trinidad and Tobago and Colombia on the northern coast of South America, and as far north as Nicaragua, Honduras, Belize and Guatemala. The languages used to be found in Argentina and Paraguay as well.

Arawak-speaking peoples migrated to islands in the Caribbean some 2,500 years ago, settling the Greater Antilles and the Bahamas. It is possible that some poorly attested extinct languages in North America, such as the languages of the Cusabo and Congaree in South Carolina, were members of this family.

Taíno, commonly called Island Arawak, was spoken on the islands of Cuba, Dominican Republic, Haiti, Puerto Rico, Jamaica, and the Bahamas. A few Taino words are still used by English, Spanish, or Haitian Creole-speaking descendants in these islands. The Taíno language was scantily attested but its classification within the Arawakan family is uncontroversial. Its closest relative among the better attested Arawakan languages seems to be the Wayuu language, spoken in Colombia and Venezuela. Scholars have suggested that the Wayuu are descended from Taíno refugees, but the theory seems impossible to prove or disprove.

Garífuna (or Black Carib) is another Arawakan language originating on the islands. It developed as the result of forced migration among people of mixed Arawak, Carib, and African descent. It is estimated to have about 195,800 speakers in Honduras, Nicaragua, Guatemala and Belize combined.

Today the Arawakan languages with the most speakers are among the more recent Ta-Arawakan (Ta-Maipurean) groups: Wayuu [Goajiro], with about 300,000 speakers; and Garifuna, with about 100,000 speakers. The Campa group is next; Asháninca or Campa proper has 15–18,000 speakers; and Ashéninca 18–25,000. After that probably comes Terêna, with 10,000 speakers; and Yanesha' [Amuesha] with 6–8,000.

== Proto-language ==
Proto-Arawakan
- Reconstruction of: Arawakan languages

Based on Nikulin's (2019) reconstruction, Proto-Arawakan phonology featured a relatively simple syllabic structure, *CVCV(CV), maintained in many modern dialects. The ancestral consonant inventory includes 19 consonants:

		Labial	Coronal	Palatal	Velar	Glottal
Nasal		*m	*n			
Stop	voiceless	*p	*t		*k	
Stop	aspirated	*pʰ	*tʰ		*kʰ	
Stop	voiced	*b	*d			
Affricate			*ts	*tʃ		
Fricative			*s	*ʃ		*h
Trill			*r			
Approximant			*l	*j	*w	

Proto-Arawakan vowels by Nikulin (2019):

	Front	Central	Back
High	*i	*ɨ	*u
Mid	*e		*o
Low		*a	

Proto-Arawak reconstructions by Aikhenvald (2002):

Proto-Arawak reconstructions by Aikhenvald (2002)

gloss	Proto-Arawak
'manioc, sweet potato'	*kali
'moon'	*kahɨ(tɨ)
'water (n)'	*hu(ː)ni
'sun, heat'	*kamui
'sun'	*ketʃi
'hammock'	*maka
'long thing objects classifier'	*-pi
'snake'	*api
'road; limited space; hollow objects classifier'	*-(a)pu
'path'	*(a)pu
'leaflike objects classifier'	*-pana
'leaf'	*pana
'thin, powder-like classifier'	*-phe
'dust'	*phe
'arm'	*dana
'hand, shoulder, arm'	*wahku
'blood'	*itha-hna
'bone'	*apɨ
'breast, milk'	*tenɨ
'snout, nose'	*t(h)aku
'snout, nose'	*kɨri
'fingernail, claw'	*huba
'excrement'	*(i)tika
'ear'	*da-keni
'eye'	*ukɨ/e
'flesh, meat'	*eki
'flesh, meat'	*ina
'flesh, meat'	*ipe
'foot'	*kipa
'hair'	*isi
'hand'	*k(h)apɨ
'head'	*kiwɨ
'horn'	*tsiwi
'leg'	*kawa
'tongue'	*nene
'lip, tongue'	*tʃɨra
'mouth'	*numa
'skin'	*mata
'tail'	*(i)di(-pi)
'ash'	*pali-ši
'earth'	*kɨpa
'lake'	*kaɨlesa
'night'	*tʃapu
'salt'	*(i)dɨwɨ
'smoke'	*kɨtʃa(li)
'stone'	*k(h)iba
'agouti'	*p(h)ɨkɨ-li
'animal'	*pɨra
'ant'	*manaci
'armadillo'	*yeti
'bee, honey'	*maba
'bird'	*kudɨ-pɨra
'crocodile'	*kasi/u
'coati'	*k(h)ape-di
'chigoe flea'	*iditu
'fish'	*kopaki
'fish'	*hima
'flea, cockroach'	*k(h)aya(pa?)
'hummingbird'	*pimi
'dog, jaguar'	*tsinu/i
'dog'	*auli
'lizard'	*dupu
'louse'	*(i)ni
'monkey'	*pude
'mosquito'	*hainiyu
'peccary'	*a(h)bɨya
'mouse, rat'	*kɨhi(ri)
'tapir'	*kema
'termite'	*kamatha/ra
'toad'	*ki(h)pa(ru)
'tortoise'	*si(n)pu
'tortoise'	*hiku(li)
'turkey, guan'	*mara-di
'wasp'	*hani/e
'achiote'	*(a)binki-thi
'manioc, cassava'	*kani
'medicine, medicinal grass'	*pini/a
'firewood'	*dika
'firewood'	*tsɨma
'flower'	*dewi
'grass'	*katʃau
'leaf'	*pana
'pepper'	*atʃɨ (di/ɨ)
'root'	*pale
'seed'	*(a)ki
'tobacco'	*yɨma
'tree'	*a(n)da
'people, body'	*mina
'man, person'	*(a)šeni/a
'man, person'	*(a)dia(-li)
'brother'	*p(h)e
'people, man'	*kaki(n)
'wife, female relative'	*ɨnu
'woman'	*tʃɨ na(-ru)
'uncle, father-in-law'	*kuhko
'fan'	*hewi
'house'	*pe, *pana/i
'dream'	*tapu
'path'	*(ah)tɨnɨ
'above, sky'	*(y)enu(hʔ)
'bad'	*ma(h)tʃi
'bitter'	*kep(h)idi
'black, dirty'	*k(h)u(e)re
'cold'	*kipa/e
'green, blue, unripe'	*šɨpule
'new'	*wada(li)
'painful'	*katʃi(wi)
'red'	*kɨra
'sweet'	*putsi
'to arrive'	*kau
'to sweep'	*pɨ(da)
'to give'	*po
'to give'	*da
'to cry'	*(i)ya
'to be sick, die'	*kama
'to drink'	*itha
'to fly'	*ara
'to hear, understand'	*kema
'to wash'	*kiba
'to eat'	*nika
'to stand'	*dɨma
'to dig'	*kika
'1st person; someone, another'	*pa-
'2nd person'	*(a)pi
'2nd person'	*yama

For lists of Proto-Arawakan reconstructions by Jolkesky (2016) and Ramirez (2019), see the corresponding Portuguese article.

== See also ==
- Arawak peoples
- English words of Arawakan origin
- Classification of Indigenous peoples of the Americas
