= Ta-Arawakan languages =

Arawakan languages of the Caribbean Sea

Ta-Arawakan
- Caribbean
- Geographic distribution: Caribbean and Central America (Belize, Guatemala, Honduras and Nicaragua's Mosquito Coast)
- Linguistic classification: Arawakan: Northern; (Caribbean); Ta-Arawakan
- Subdivisions: Wayuu–Paraujano; Antillean; Iñeri–Lokono Marawá † Taino †: ?Wiriná †; ?Waraikú †

Language codes
- Glottolog: cari1281

The Ta-Arawakan languages, also known as Ta-Maipurean and Caribbean, are the Indigenous Arawakan languages of the Caribbean islands and mostly coastal South America. They are distinguished by the first person pronominal prefix ta-, as opposed to common Arawakan na-.

== Languages ==
Kaufman (1994) provides the following subclassification:

- Caribbean Arawakan
  - Taíno†
  - Guajiro (Wahiro)
    - Wayuu (Guajiro, Wahiro)
    - Paraujano (Parauhano, Añun; 1 speaker remain)
    - Arawák (Lokono)
  - Iñeri (Inyeri)
    - Kalhíphona (Island Carib, modern Garífuna or Black Carib)

Aikhenvald adds Shebayo, which Kaufman had left unclassified, and removes Iñeri from Ta-Arawakan proper:

- Caribbean Arawakan
  - Iñeri
    - Kalhíphona
  - Ta-Arawakan
    - Taíno†
    - Wayuu
    - Paraujano
    - Arawák
    - Shebayo†
    - Caquetio†

== Proto-language ==
Reconstructions of Proto-Lokono-Guajiro proposed by Captain (1991):

| no. | gloss | Proto Lokono-Guajiro |
|---|---|---|
| 1. | 'abdomen' | *Vteke |
| 2. | 'after' | *dikʰi |
| 3. | 'ant' | *hayu |
| 4. | 'anteater' | *waRiti |
| 5. | 'arm' | *dɨna |
| 6. | 'armadillo' | *yekerV |
| 7. | 'arrow' | *kimařa |
| 8. | 'ash' | *baliki |
| 9. | 'ask' | *asa (?) |
| 10. | 'axe' | *bařu |
| 11. | 'back' | *asabu |
| 12. | 'bat' | *busiri |
| 13. | 'bathe' | *aka |
| 14. | 'beard' | *tiima |
| 15. | 'bird' | *kudibiu |
| 16. | 'blood' | *itʰa |
| 17. | 'bone' | *Vbu-na |
| 18. | 'breast' | *(u)di |
| 19. | 'break' | *wakVdV- |
| 20. | 'by (agent)' | *duma |
| 21. | 'cane' | *isi |
| 22. | 'canoe' | *kanuwa |
| 23. | 'chest' | *Vluwa |
| 24. | 'child' | *(?)ibili |
| 25. | 'chili pepper' | *hatʰi |
| 26. | 'chop' | *lada |
| 27. | 'cold, have a | *tʰunuli- |
| 28. | 'come' | *andV |
| 29. | 'cricket' | *pʰuti |
| 30. | 'crocodile' | *kayukutʰi |
| 31. | 'delicious' | *keme- |
| 32. | 'down' | *unabu |
| 33. | 'drink (v)' | *VtʰV |
| 34. | 'ear' | *dike |
| 35. | 'egret' | *wakaRa |
| 36. | 'eye' | *aku |
| 37. | 'exit (v)' | *apʰuti- |
| 38. | 'fat, grease' | *akusi |
| 39. | 'father' | *Vtʰi |
| 40. | 'finger' | *kʰabu-ibira |
| 41. | 'fingernail' | *bada |
| 42. | 'fire' | *sikʰi |
| 43. | 'fish' | *hime |
| 44. | 'flea' | *kʰayaba |
| 45. | 'flesh' | *kiruku |
| 46. | 'flower' | *siwi |
| 47. | 'fly' | *mabuRi |
| 48. | 'foot' | *ukuti |
| 49. | 'for (benefactive)' | *bura |
| 50. | 'forehead' | *kibu |
| 51 | 'from (LOC)' | *-kee |
| 52. | 'fur' | *Vti |
| 53. | 'go' | *kuna |
| 54. | 'gourd' | *iwida |
| 55. | 'grandfather' | *dukutʰi |
| 56. | 'grandmother' | *kVtʰV |
| 57. | 'green' | *subule |
| 58. | 'hair' | *Vbařa |
| 59. | 'hammock' | *hamaka; *kura |
| 60. | 'hand' | *kʰabu |
| 61. | 'hate, be hated' | *te- |
| 62. | 'head' | *ikiwi |
| 63. | 'hear' | *akanaba |
| 64. | 'here' | *yaha |
| 65. | 'honey' | *maba |
| 66. | 'horn' | *ukuwa |
| 67. | 'house' | *bahɨ |
| 68. | 'I' | *dakia |
| 69. | 'iguana' | *iwana |
| 70. | 'in' | *luku |
| 71 | 'in (a fluid)' | *raku |
| 72. | 'juice' | *Vra |
| 73. | 'kill' | *pʰarV |
| 74. | 'knife' | *ruři |
| 75. | 'leaf | *bana |
| 76. | 'liver' | *bana |
| 77. | 'maize' | *mariki |
| 78. | 'manioc' | *kʰali |
| 79. | 'manioc starch' | *hařo |
| 80. | 'many' | *yuhu |
| 81. | 'monkey' | *pʰudi |
| 82. | 'moon' | *katʰi |
| 83. | 'mosquito' | *maRi |
| 84. | 'mother' | *uyu |
| 85. | 'neck' | *nuru |
| 86. | 'nose' | *kiri |
| 87. | 'one' | *aba |
| 88. | 'path' | *bɨna; *wabu |
| 89. | 'peck' | *tuka- |
| 90. | 'penis' | *ewera |
| 91. | 'rat' | *kuři |
| 92. | 'raw' | *iya |
| 93. | 'request' | *kʰuyabV- |
| 94. | 'resin' | *Vkʰɨ |
| 95. | 'ripe' | *hebe |
| 96. | 'river' | *sVři |
| 97. | 'root' | *akura |
| 98. | 'say' | *akV |
| 99. | 'sea' | *bařawa |
| 100. | 'seat, stool' | *turu |
| 101. | 'she' | *tʰukia |
| 102. | 'skin' | *Vda |
| 103. | 'sleep' | *dunkV |
| 104. | 'snake' | *uri |
| 105. | 'son-in-law' | *titʰi |
| 106. | 'sound' | *akanVkɨ |
| 107. | 'star' | *iwiwa |
| 108. | 'stone' | *kiba |
| 109. | 'stop' | *takɨ- |
| 110. | 'sweet potato' | *halitʰi |
| 111. | 'tail' | *isi |
| 112. | 'tapir' | *kama |
| 113. | 'termite' | *kʰumutʰiri |
| 114. | 'that (masculine)' | *lira |
| 115. | 'that (non-masculine)' | *tura |
| 116. | 'there' | *yara |
| 117. | 'they' | *nakia |
| 118. | 'thigh' | *(N)bɨku |
| 119. | 'this (masculine)' | *lihi |
| 120. | 'this (non-masculine)' | *tuhu |
| 121. | 'thou' | *bukia |
| 122. | 'three' | *kabɨnV |
| 123. | 'tip' | *kiruku |
| 124. | 'toad' | *kiberu |
| 125. | 'tobacco' | *yuři |
| 126. | 'tongue' | *Vyee |
| 127. | 'tooth' | *ari |
| 128. | 'touch, feel' | *bebeda |
| 129. | 'tree' | *kunuku |
| 130. | 'two' | *biama |
| 131. | 'up' | *iu- |
| 132. | 'vomit' | *ewedV |
| 133. | 'water' | *uni |
| 134. | 'we' | *wakia |
| 135. | 'with (accomp.)' | *Vma |
| 136. | 'whistle' | *wiwida- |
| 137. | 'woman' | *hiaru |
| 138. | 'worm' | *-koma- |
| 139. | 'ye' | *hukia |
| 140. | 'yes' | *VNhVN |
| 141. | (absolutive) | *-hV |
| 142. | (poss. suffix) | *-tʰe |
