= Upper Amazon Arawakan languages =

Family of languages

Upper Amazonian Arawakan
- Inland Northern Maipuran
- Geographic distribution: Northern Amazon
- Linguistic classification: Arawakan: Northern; Upper Amazonian Arawakan
- Subdivisions: Western Nawiki; Eastern Nawiki; Central (Orinoco); Manao †

Language codes
- Glottolog: inla1264
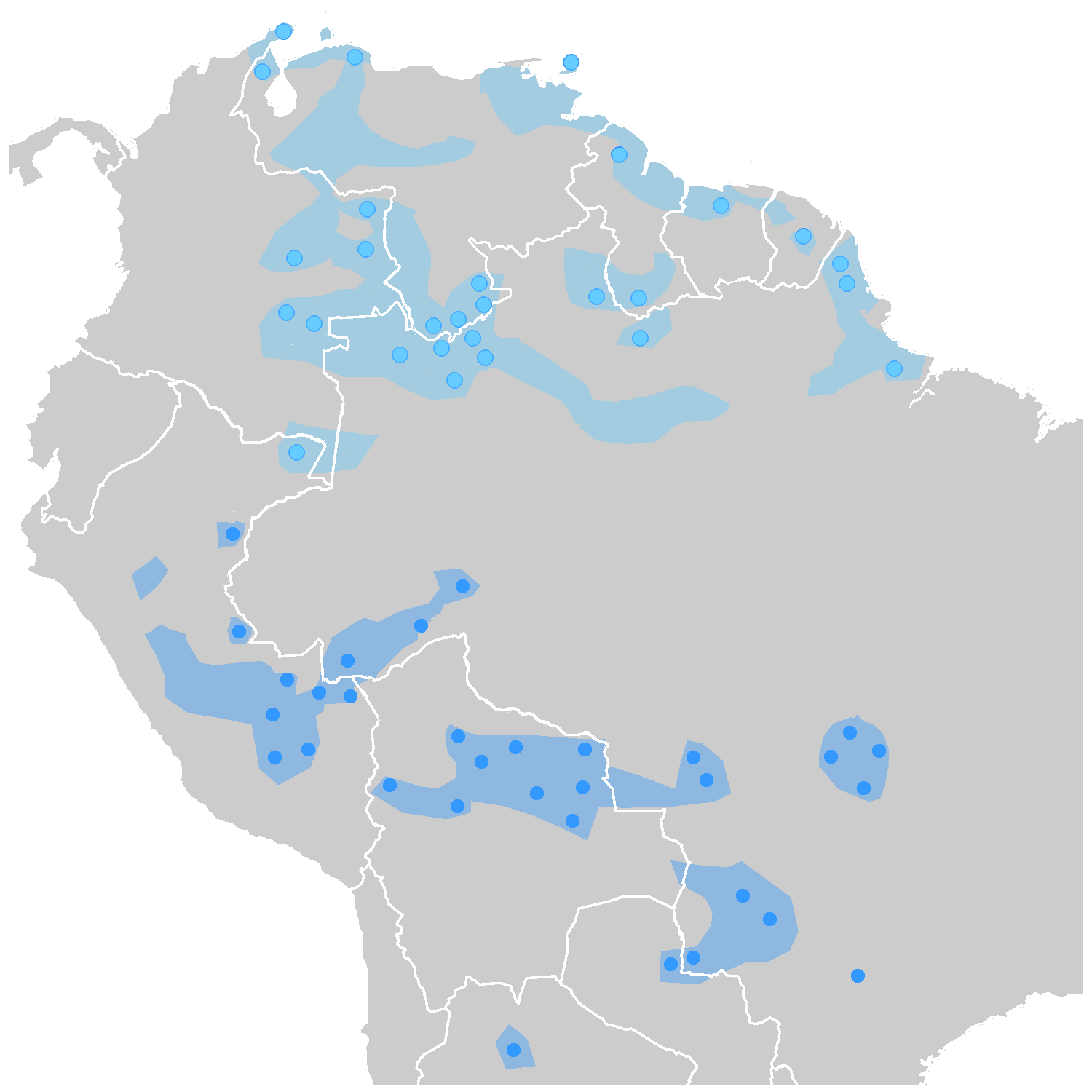
- documented languages areas and approximate early probable areas.

The Upper Amazon Maipurean languages, a.k.a. North Amazonian or Inland Northern Maipuran, are Arawakan languages of the northern Amazon in Colombia, Venezuela, Peru, and Brazil.

Upper Amazon Arawakan has been surveyed comprehensively by Henri Ramirez (2001), which includes a historical reconstruction as well.

== Languages ==
=== Kaufman (1994) ===
Kaufman (1994) gives the following breakdown (Aikhenvald's names of branches in parentheses):

  - Western Nawiki (Colombian)
    - Wainumá group †
      - Wainumá †
      - Mariaté †
      - Anauyá †
    - Piapoko group
      - Achagua (Achawa)
      - Piapoco
      - Amarizana †
      - Caviyari (Cabiyarí) †?
    - Warekena group
      - Guarequena (Warekena)
      - Mandahuaca (Mandawaka)
    - Río Negro group †
      - Jumana (Yumana) †
      - Pasé †
      - Cawishana †
    - Yucuna group
      - Yucuna (Jukuna)
      - Guarú †
  - Eastern Nawiki (Upper Rio Negro)
    - Tariana
    - Karu group
      - Kurripako (a.k.a. Ipeka-Tapuia-Curripako)
      - Baniwa (of Içana) (Carútana-Baniwa)
      - Katapolítani-Moriwene-Mapanai (Kadaupuritana)
  - Resígaro
  - Central Upper Amazon (Orinoco)
    - Baré group
      - Marawá †
      - Baré
      - Guinao †
    - Yavitero group †
      - Yavitero †
      - Baniwa (Abane)
      - Maipure †
  - Manao (Middle Rio Negro) †
    - Manao †
    - Kariaí (Cariyai) †

He leaves the following Upper Amazon languages unclassified:

- Shiriana (Xiriâna) †, Yabaána †, Waraikú (Araikú) †, Wiriná †

=== Aikhenvald (1999) ===
In 1999 Aikhenvald classified a couple languages Kaufman left out (Shiriana, Yabaâna), but leaves several of the Western Nawiki languages and branches unclassified. Several languages — Maipure, Resígaro, Cawishana, Mandahuaca, and Guarequena — are moved. She treats the Yucuna, Karu (Baniwa), and Bare groups as single languages.

  - Western Nawiki (Colombian)
    - Maipure †
    - Resígaro †?
    - Achagua (Achawa)
    - Piapoco
    - Caviyari (Cabiyarí) †?
    - Yucuna (Jukuna) (dialect: Guarú †)
  - Eastern Nawiki (Upper Rio Negro)
    - Tariana
    - Baniwa (Carútana-Baniwa) (dialects: Curripako, Catapolítani)
    - Guarequena (Warekena)
  - Central Upper Amazon (Orinoco)
    - Mandahuaca (Mandawaka)
    - Yabaâna †
    - Baré (dialect: Guinao †)
    - Yavitero †
    - Baniwa of Guainia †
  - Manao (Middle Rio Negro) †
    - Manao †
    - Shiriana (Xiriâna) †
    - Cawishana (Kaiʃana) †

Unclassified †: Wainumá, Mariaté, Anauyá, Amarizana, Jumana (Yumana), Pasé, Kariaí (Cariyai), Waraikú (Araikú), Wiriná. Cabre (Cavare) was found in the area of the Western Nawiki languages, but only a few words are known. The "Ponares language" listed in Ethnologue may have been Piapoco or Achagua.
