= Baniwa of Guainía =

Arawakan language spoken in Brazil and Venezuela

- Baniwa of Maroa
- Native to: Brazil, Venezuela
- Native speakers: (c. 210 cited 1999)
- Language family: Arawakan: Northern; Upper Amazon; Orinoco; Baniwa of Guainía–Yavitero; Baniwa of Guainía
- Dialects: Warekena do rio Xié

Language codes
- ISO 639-3: gae (Note: also applies to Warekena Velha)
- Glottolog: guar1293
- ELP: Guarequena

- Warekena is classified as Severely Endangered by the UNESCO Atlas of the World's Languages in Danger.

Baniwa of Guainía, or Baniwa of Maroa, is an Arawakan language of Brazil and of Maroa Municipality in Venezuela, spoken near the Guainia River. It is one of several languages which go by the generic name Baniwa/Baniva. One of its primary dialects is Warekena (Guarequena), or more precisely Warekena of Xié.

== History ==
Baniwa of Guainia only recently appeared on the Xie River, displacing the original, or "old" Warekena language. Beginning in the early 20th century, most of the Warekena people migrated into Venezuela from the Xie River in Brazil. They then switched to a dialect of the Baniwa language of Guainía, but preserved their name and the history of their origins. A number of Baniwa of Guainía-speaking Warekena then moved back to the Xie River in the 1920s.

== Classification ==
Baniwa of Guainía is classified by Alexandra Aikhenvald (1998) as a member of the Içana-Vaupes subgroup of Northern Arawakan, and is closest linguisticaly to Mandawaca, whereas Baniwa of Guainia is closer to Yavitero and Maipure. The two of them are only distantly related to each other and hardly intelligible with one another. Terrence Kaufman (1994) classified it in a Warekena group of Western Nawiki Upper Amazonian, Aikhenvald (1999) in Eastern Nawiki.

== Phonology ==
=== Consonants ===
Equivalents in the Baniwa of Guainía practical orthography are given below.

Baniwa of Guainía consonants
		Labial	Dental	Alveolar		Palatal	Velar
		Labial	Dental	med.	lat.	Palatal	Velar
Nasal		m	n				
Plosive/ Affricate	voiceless	p	t	ts			k
Plosive/ Affricate	voiced	b	d	dz			ɡ
Fricative	voiceless			ʂ ⟨sr⟩			
Fricative	voiced			ʐ ⟨zr⟩			
Rhotic	tap			ɾ ⟨r⟩	ɺ ⟨l⟩		
Rhotic	trill			r ⟨rr⟩			
Approximant		w				j ⟨y⟩	

Unlike its relatives Baré and Baniwa of Içana, Baniwa of Guainía lacks aspirated stops. /g/ is rare and "very unusual" for a Northern Arawakan language.

=== Vowels ===
	Front	Central	Back
High	i		u
Mid	e		
Low		a	

/u/ has an allophone of [o], commonly encountered in rapid speech and also appearing in a number of loanwords. /a/ may also be reduced to [ə] word-finally in syllables after a stressed syllable. Vowel length is phonemic, though has a low functional load, and long vowels are frequently shortened when the stress is shifted in phrases.

== Morphology ==
=== Nouns ===
==== Pronouns ====
Personal pronouns in Baniwa of Guainia are formed by adding an emphatic suffix -ya to the cross-referencing personal prefixes.

== Syntax ==
Unmarked constituent order is AVO, VS_{o}, S_{a}V, or S_{io}V.

wa-hã waʃi yutʃia-hã ema
then-PAUS jaguar kill-PAUS tapir
"Then the jaguar killed the tapir"

ʃupe-hẽ ʃiani-pe
many-PAUS child-PL
"Children are many"

peya nu-yaɺitua wiyua
one 1sg-brother die
"One of my brothers dies"

nu-yue mawali
1sg-for hungry
"I am hungry"

Indirect objects tend to be placed immediately after the predicate.
