= Agavotaguerra language =

Dialect of the Yawalapití language

Agavotaguerra
- Agavotocueng
- (unattested)
- Native to: Brazil
- Region: Mato Grosso
- Ethnicity: Agavotoqëng
- Extinct: (date missing)
- Language family: Arawakan: (unclassified) Southern?; Paresí–Xingu?; Waurá?; Yawalapití; Agavotaguerra

Language codes
- ISO 639-3: avo
- Glottolog: agav1236
- ELP: Agavotaguerra

Agavotaguerra (Agavotoqueng) is a supposed, extinct Arawakan language of Brazil. Ethnologue leaves it "unclassified", but notes that it is related to Waura and Yawalapiti, which suggests that it is an Arawakan language of the Xingu group. Glottolog states that it is unattested, which suggests that any classification is ethnic rather than linguistic. According to the Kuikuro, the Agavotoqëng speak the same language as the Yawalapiti.
