= Warekena Velha language =

Arawakan language

Warekena Velha
- Warekena do San Miguel
- Walékhena
- Native to: Venezuela
- Ethnicity: 513 Warekena (2001)
- Native speakers: 180 (2012)
- Language family: Arawakan: Northern; Upper Amazon; Orinoco; Warekena Velha

Language codes
- ISO 639-3: gae (Note: also applies to Baniwa of Guainía)
- Glottolog: ware1255
- ELP: Guarequena
- Linguasphere: 82-AFE-aa

Warekena Velha (Guarequena Antiguo, Old Warekena, Guarequena: Walékhena 'star people'), also Warekena of San Miguel, is an endangered Arawakan language most closely related to Mandahuaca.

== History ==
According to Theodor Koch-Grunberg (1911), "Old" Warekena was once spoken on the Içana and Xie Rivers. Beginning in the late 18th century, the Warekena people were displaced from their territory "several times". They subsequently migrated to the upper Orinoco in Venezuela, as documented by Richard Spruce in 1854 and Moritz Richard Schomburgk in 1839. Interestingly, Koch-Grünberg (1911) neglects any mention of the Baniwa language of Guainia, or "modern" Warekena, indicating its speakers had migrated to the Xie river later. When they moved to Venezuela, most of the Warekena switched to the Baniwa language of Guainia after they migrated to Venezuela from the Xie river, though preserving the name "Warekena" and the story of their origins. Curt Nimuendajú (1982) reports the "Uarequéna" language was nearly extinct, as its speakers were dispersed around the area of Guzmán Blanco. Eduardo Galvão (1979) reports the "Warikena" language and tribe as extinct. Some of the Baniwa-speaking Warekena moved back to the Xie river in the 1920s. The Ethnologue's 16th edition reports that the language was spoken by 340 people in Brazil as of 1983 in remote areas, and that its speakers had a positive attitude towards the language.

== Classification ==
This language is classified by Alexandra Aikhenvald (1998) as a member of the Içana-Vaupes subgroup of Northern Arawakan, and is closest linguisticaly to the Mandawaca language. It is hardly intelligible with the Baniwa language of Guainia.
