= Morique language =

Extinct Arawakan language

Morique
- Mayoruna, Mayú
- Moríke
- Native to: Peru
- Region: between the Ucayali River and Javari River
- Extinct: after 1930
- Language family: Arawakan: Southern; Purus-Chamicuro; Chamicuro–Morike; Morique

Language codes
- ISO 639-3: None (mis)
- Glottolog: mori1273

Morique (Morique: Moríke, Mayoruna, Mayú) is an extinct, poorly attested Arawakan language that was spoken between the Ucayali River and Javari River in Peru. The only documentation of it comes from Günter Tessmann's 1930 book. It is closely related to Chamicuro.

== History ==
=== Documentation ===
The German anthropologist Günter Tessmann collected a number of wordlists for the languages of Peru and published them in 1930, among them Morique, which he erroneously referred to as "Mayoruna". Tesmann obtained the Morique wordlist from a Morique man living in Requena, Loreto, but did not visit any Morique villages. Another wordlist was collected later from relatives of women from another tribe called Mayú by, and had been exterminated by, the Matses, from a man named Cuibusio, whose mother was captured from the Mayú and had been integrated into Matses society. He was around 60 years old in 1975, but had died by 2007. This term was used to refer to various groups who spoke Panoan languages, of which Morique is clearly not a member of. This confusion led to the Morique people being conflated with the Panoan-speaking Mayoruna groups, basing over half of their ethnographic description of the "Mayoruna" on the Morique.

== Classification ==
Most authors who have classified Morique do not consider it to be Panoan. John Alden Mason (1950) left it unclassified due to confusin with other Mayoruna groups. Čestmír Loukotka (1935) left it as a language isolate, though in his 1968 clasification he grouped it within Arawakan, though still in its own branch. However, Loukotka and Paul Rivet's joint (1952) classification grouped Morique as Panoan, though with Arawakan influence. The wordlists for both Mayú and Morique are very similar, and therefore may be from the same language.
