= Kaishana language =

Arawakan language of Brazil

Cawishana
- Kaixana
- noláhyna
- Native to: Brazil
- Native speakers: 1 (2012)
- Language family: Arawakan: Northern; Upper Amazon; Manao; Cawishana

Language codes
- ISO 639-3: None (mis)
- Glottolog: kais1242
- ELP: Kaixana
- Linguasphere: 82-AFF-ca

Kawishana (Cawishana, Kayuwishana, Kaishana: noláhyna) is a nearly extinct Arawakan language of Brazil. A few speakers were reported in the 1950s, and today, as of 2012, only one person can speak it. It has an active–stative syntax.

== Classification ==
Aikhenvald (1999) classifies it as a Middle Rio Negro, North Amazonian language, along with Bahuana and Manao.

Kaufman (1994) had placed it in a branch of Western Nawiki Upper Amazonian along with two long-extinct languages, Jumana (Yumana) and Pasé, which Aikhenvald leaves unclassified.
