= Yawalapití language =

Arawakan language of Brazil

Yawalapiti
- Jaulapiti
- Native to: Brazil
- Region: Xingu Indigenous Park, Mato Grosso
- Ethnicity: Yawalapiti
- Native speakers: 8 (2006)
- Language family: Arawakan: Southern ?; Paresí–Xingu; Waurá; Yawalapiti
- Dialects: Agavotaguerra

Language codes
- ISO 639-3: yaw
- Glottolog: yawa1261
- ELP: Yawalapití; Agavotaguerra

Yawalapiti (Jaulapiti) is an Arawakan language of Brazil. The Agavotaguerra (Agavotoqueng) reportedly spoke the same language. Speakers of the language live in a village along the edge of the river Tuatuari, a tributary of the Kuluene River, located in the southern part of the Xingu Indigenous Park (Upper Xingu), in the state of Mato Grosso.

== Phonology ==
=== Consonants ===
Yawalapiti and Waurá, an Arawakan language belonging to the same subgroup, share a very similar phonemic inventory. The main segments are classified in the following table.

Consonant phonemes
	Bilabial	Alveolar	Retroflex	Palatal	Velar	Glottal
Nasal	m	n		ɲ		
Plosive	p	t		(c)	k	ʔ
Affricate		ts		tʃ		
Fricative			ʂ ~ ʐ	ʃ		h
Lateral		l		ʎ		
Vibrant		r̥				
Flap		ɾ				
Semivowel	w				j	

There are no voiced plosives or affricates in the language. The palatal [c] appears to be an allophone of /k/ occurring before the front vowel /i/, e.g. [puˈluka] "countryside" vs. [naˈciɾu] "my aunt". Also, the fricative /ʂ/ is in free variation with its voiced counterpart and /ʐ/ respectively, e.g. [iˈʂa ~ iˈʐa] "canoe".

There are also some phonotactic constraints that dictate what types of consonants are allowed to appear in certain positions inside a word. For instance, the sounds /tʃ, l, ɾ/ cannot occur before the vowel /ɨ/, and the latter two are restricted to the medial position. In a similar manner, the liquid /ʎ/ is only observed in medial position and never before /a/. As for the voiceless /r̥/, it is the only rhotic segment that is allowed to appear in any position and before any vowel. The semivowel /w/ is found in initial, medial and final position, while /j/ does not occur in final position.

The glottal stop is automatic in words beginning or ending in a vowel, i.e. a word like /u/ "water" is pronounced as [ˈʔuʔ].

=== Vowels ===
The Yawalapiti language has both oral and nasal vowels, as shown below.

Vowel phonemes
	Front		Central		Back	
	oral	nasal	oral	nasal	oral	nasal
High	i	ĩ	ɨ	ɨ̃	u	ũ
Low			a	ã		

Although nasal vowels mostly occur before or after nasal consonants, e.g. [ˈĩmi] "pequi oil" or [ˈmũnu] "termite", there are cases in which they are found in non-nasal environments, e.g. [hã ~ hĩ] (emphatic particle). Simple vowels can form various diphthongs, mainly /iu, ui, ia, ai, au, ua, ɨu, uɨ/.

Contrary to Waurá, Yawalapiti has no /e/ sound. This is because Proto-Arawak *e has evolved as /ɨ/ while, at the same time, Proto-Arawak *i and *ɨ have merged resulting into /i/ in Yawalapiti.

=== Phonotactics ===
Syllables in Yawalapiti can be of the type V, CV and, only in word-final position, (C)Vʔ. The stress may fall on the penultimate or on the last syllable of a word.

== Morphology ==
=== Classifiers and derivational suffixes ===
As in other Arawakan languages, Yawalapiti is agglutinative and makes use of affixes, especially suffixes, to convey basic grammatical relations. Nominal suffixes can be divided into two groups: classifiers and derivational suffixes.

The main classifiers found in Yawalapiti refer to the shape of an object or some other characteristic of it, like texture, length and position.

classifier	semantics
-ja	liquid
-ti	elongated
-ta	circular or spherical
-ka	flat
-pana	leaf-shaped
-lu	wrapping

These morphemes attach to adjectives when they refer to a noun that needs a classifier, as in the following example.

kulata-ja u.
hot-CL.liquid water
Hot water.

natʃa autsa-lu
clothes new-CL.wrapping
New clothes.

Derivational suffixes are applied to primitive nouns to form new compound nouns. Sometimes, however, the meaning of the original noun is not known.

tsɨmɨ-r̥i
tapir-DS.long
boa constrictor

ina-pi
?-DS.pointed
fish bone

=== Possessives ===
Nominal and verbal prefixes intervene in the formation of possessive phrases, and can indicate the subject or the object of a verb phrase. The set of possessive prefixes of Yawalapiti is very similar to those of the other languages of the Arawakan branch.

Possessive and personal prefixes
	Before vowels	
	Singular	Plural
1st person	n-, ni-	a-, aw-
2nd person	p-, pi-	i-
3rd person	in-	in- ... -pa
	Before consonants	
	Singular	Plural
1st person	nu-	a-
2nd person	hi-, ti-	i-
3rd person	i-	i- ... -pa

In vowel initial nouns and verbs, the forms ni- and pi- are frequently used with roots beginning in u, while the prefix aw- appears systematically before a. In nouns and verbs beginning in consonant, the form ti- occurs only when the root starts with h (in all the other cases, hi- is used). The third person plural is actually a circumfix formed by the correspondent prefix of the third person singular and the pluralizer suffix -pa. When nouns beginning with p, k, t, m, n, w and j are modified by the prefix of second person singular or plural, their initial sounds are subject to the following morphophonemic changes.

p → ɾ
k → tʃ
t → ts
m → ɲ
n → ɲ
w → Ø
j → Ø

Thus, for example, -kuʃu "head" becomes hi-tʃuʃu "your head" (but nu-kuʃu "my head"), -palaka "face" becomes hi-ɾalaka "your face" (but nu-palata "my face") and -jakanati "saliva" becomes hi-akanati "your saliva" (but nu-jakanati "my saliva").

Apart from possessive prefixes, alienable nouns also receive alienable possessive suffixes, as in the case of uku "arrow", which becomes n-uku-la "my arrow", p-uku-la "your arrow", in-uku-la "his/her arrow", etc.

=== Independent pronouns ===
Independent pronouns of first and second person are listed in the table below.

	Singular	Plural
1st person	natu	aʂu
2nd person	tiʂu	iʂu

For the third person, Yawalapiti speakers use demonstrative pronouns, which are also marked for gender.

	Masculine	Feminine
Near	iɾi	iɾu
Far	itiɾa	iɾutiɾa

== Syntax ==
From a typological point of view, the order of constituents in Yawalapiti is SVO. In genitive constructions, the possessor precedes the possessed item. The same is true for other modifiers, especially demonstratives and numerals, while adjectives are free to occur before or after their referent.
