= Mandahuaca language =

Extinct Arawakan language formerly spoken in Venezuela

Mandahuaca
- Mandawaka, Mawaca
- Native to: Venezuela, Brazil
- Extinct: by 1995
- Language family: Arawakan: Northern; Upper Amazon; Orinoco; Mandahuaca

Language codes
- ISO 639-3: mht
- Glottolog: mand1448

Mandahuaca (Mandawaka) is an extinct Arawakan language formerly of Venezuela and Brazil. The most recent data was published in 1975. It is one of several languages which goes by the generic name Baré.

== Classification ==
Kaufman (1994) classified it in a Warekena group of Western Nawiki Upper Amazonian, Aikhenvald (1999) in Central (Orinoco) Upper Amazonian. According to a speaker of Baré (Barawana), Mandawaca was mutually intelligible with it.
