= YBN =

YBN may refer to:

- YBN (collective), an American rap collective
- YBN University, a private school in Ranchi, Jharkhand, India
- Yardbarker Network (YBN), an American sports blog network
- Young British Naturists (YBN), the under-30 wing of the nudist organization
- ISO 639:ybn, ISO code for the Yabaâna language
