= Saluma language =

Saluma language can be:

- Salumã language (Arawakan)
- Salumá language (Cariban)
