= Saraveca language =

Extinct Arawakan language of Bolivia

Saraveca
- Sarave, Xaráy
- Native to: Bolivia
- Region: Eastern lowlands
- Ethnicity: Sarave(ca)
- Extinct: after 1962
- Language family: Arawakan: Southern ?; Paresí–Xingu; Paresí; Saraveca

Language codes
- ISO 639-3: sar
- Glottolog: sara1331
- ELP: Saraveca

Saraveca (Xaray) is an extinct Arawakan language once spoken in Bolivia by the Sarave. The language is known from about 400 words and a short text, and is closest to the Paresi language, spoken in Brazil.

== Classification ==
Saraveca is closest linguistically to the still-spoken Paresi language of Brazil. Its connection with the other languages of the Arawakan language family was first recognized by Daniel Garrison Brinton (1891). It is rather divergent from the other Arawakan languages spoken in Bolivia.

== Geographical distribution ==
The language was spoken on the Rio Verde in Bolivia, "very close" to the Brazilian border. To its northwest was the Tupian Warázu (Pauserna), to its west were the Paunaka and Paiconeca languages, to its south were the Kuruminaka, Curucaneca, and Chiquitano languages, and to its north and east were the Arawakan Paresi and Kabixi.

== History ==
By 1962, most of the Sarave people had switched to Chiquitano, though they had been assimilating into local society since the 18th century.

=== Documentation ===
The only documentation of Saraveca includes a "very short" text recorded by Hugh Weddell and published in 1851, a 23-word list recorded by Alcide d'Orbigny (1839), and 400 or so words and phrases compiled by Georges de Crequi-Montfort and Paul Rivet (1913), as well as unpublished materials, including those gathered by Johann Natterer (152 words) and Fuß (25 words).

== Vocabulary ==
=== Numbers ===
It is said to be the only language with a numeral system based exclusively on five.

Saraveca numerals
Number	Saraveca
one	atia
two	iñama
three	anahama
four	azarakapa
five	ara-piaiče
ten	iñama no-kaxixi (Note: literally 'two hands')
twenty-five	arapiaiče no-kaxixi (Note: literally 'five hands')

According to d'Orbigny, some of these numerals correspond to the words for fingers:

Saraveca finger words
gloss	Saraveca
thumb	atia
index	iñama
middle	anahama
ring	azarakapa
little	ara-piaiče

He also gives an alternative word for 'thumb', nu-kaxi-axi-če.

== Sample text ==
The Saraveka text collected by Weddell is presented below, with interlinear glosses provided by Crequi-Montfort and Rivet (1913).

Nu-bīīm n-ĭča umadea taneštupa evareūri
my-heart I-give {} of-God {in the name}
'I entrust my heart to you in the name of the All-Powerful'

Naatro kinhabe-sāri mačakūa kāna ntimamūne
me unhappy person {} {}
'I am unhappy and no one pities me'

Tapičako naneštupa eda-iāre menadīi
{} God great for-me(?)
'However God is great to me'
