= Anauyá language =

Arawakan language of Brazil

Anauyá
- Native to: Venezuela
- Region: Amazonas
- Extinct: (date missing)
- Language family: Arawakan: Northern; Upper Amazonian; Western Nawiki; Wainumá group; Anauyá

Language codes
- ISO 639-3: None (mis)
- Glottolog: anau1243

Anauyá is an extinct, poorly attested and unclassified Arawakan language of Venezuela, originally spoken on the Castaña River in Amazonas. Its only documentation comes from a 1928 book.

== Classification ==
Kaufman (1994) placed it in his Wainumá branch, but this is not followed in Aikhenvald (1999). It is classified as a member of the Río Negro group by Ramirez and França (2019).

== Vocabulary ==
Anauyá vocabulary
gloss	Anauyá	gloss	Anauyá
hand	nun-kapi	my plantation	nun-kaniká-sirra
eye	nun-hinihahy	my house	nun-hána
head	nun-húida	your house	hi-ána
hair	nun-huíssihin	canoe	ide
ear	nun-tašihin	oar	šanahurri
nose	nun-hírri	people	ase
mouth	nun-uma	stone	yahôko
tongue	na-nene	wood	ada
leg	nun-sarrái	cotton	kanarisi
thigh	nun-hônin	thread	kanari
foot	nú-niti	knife	harrohorri
knee	nun-édorro	axe	čífara
arm	nun-kano	banana	parána
bone	nun-korokorô-ni	pot	orîso
neck	nun-orri	fish	undrrimani
beard	nun-sanuma	jaguar	šaáui
tooth	ná-ida	tapir	šurauirri
eyebrows	nau-itâme	wild pig	aíša
eyelashes	nau-isêrri	sheep	uahika
rain	yánaui	1	ahiari
dog	onimináu	2	mahôrene
house	ahirri	3	marahurraka
mountain	hadásí	4	arrimâhi
river	uni	5	akayuhaka
water	uni	green woodpecker	serrierri
fire	ríkárri	chili pepper	atido
tobacco	sierro	woman	inanaí
red	mitsai	boy	yanênaui
manioc	kamikási	old person	koinašôa
