= Mehinaku language =

Arawakan language spoken by the Mehinaku people of Brazil

Mehináku
- Meinaku
- Imiehünaku
- Pronunciation: [imʲehɨnaku]
- Native to: Brazil
- Region: Xingu Indigenous Park, Mato Grosso
- Ethnicity: Mehinako
- Native speakers: 227 (2006)
- Language family: Arawakan: Southern ?; Paresí–Xingu; Waurá; Waura–Mehináku; Mehináku
- Dialects: Waurá-kumá

Language codes
- ISO 639-3: mmh
- Glottolog: mehi1240
- ELP: Mehináku

Mehináku (Meinaku) is an Arawakan language spoken by the Mehinaku people in the Xingu Indigenous Park of Brazil. One dialect, Waurá-kumá, is "somewhat intelligible" with Waurá due to influence from this language.

== Phonology ==
Mehináku features five vowels /a e i ɨ u/ which can be either oral or nasal /ã ẽ ĩ ɨ̃ ũ/.

The language has thirteen consonants.

Mehináku Consonants
	Labial	Alveolar	Postalveolar	Retroflex	Palatal	Velar	Glottal
Plosive	p	t				k	
Affricate		ts	tʃ				
Fricative				ʂ			h
Nasal	m	n					
Lateral		l					
Tap		ɾ					
Approximant	w				j		
