= Enawene Nawe language =

Arawakan language of Brazil

Enawene Nawe
- Salumã
- Native to: Brazil
- Region: Mato Grosso
- Ethnicity: Enawene Nawe people
- Native speakers: 570 (2014)
- Language family: Arawakan: Southern; Paresi–Xingu ?; Paresi–Enawene Nawe ?; Enawene Nawe

Language codes
- ISO 639-3: unk
- Glottolog: enaw1238
- ELP: Enawené-Nawé

Enawene Nawe (Enawené-Nawé, Enawenê-Nawê, Eneuene-Mare), also known as Salumã, is an Arawakan language of Brazil spoken by about 570 people living in the Juruena River basin area, and more specifically along the Iquê river in the state of Mato Grosso.

== Classification ==
Aikhenvald (1999) classifies Enawene Nawe as a South Arawak language together with Terena, Lapachu and Moxo. However, more recent works by both Fabre (2005) and Brandão & Facundes (2007) consider the language to form a subgroup with Paresi in the Paresi–Xingu branch of Arawakan languages.

Comparison of personal pronouns between Paresi and Enawene Nawe
Person	Paresi	Enawene Nawe
1SG	natyo	nato
2SG	hitso	hixo
3SG	eze	ere
1PL	witso	wixo
2PL	xitso	dexo
3PL	ezenae	erenaha

Comparison of numbers
Number	Paresi	Enawene Nawe
one	hatita	xoxola
two	hinama	initini
three	hanama	koytala
four	zalakakoa	noxi

Comparison of other vocabulary
Word	Paresi	Enawene Nawe
to fall	ezoa	edoa
itch	mare, mali	wera
drink	era, tera	wesera
corn	kozeto	korito
eye	zotse	edose
house	hati, hana	hakolo
vulture	oloho	olohõ
night	maka	mikya
stone	tsehali	sairi
uncle	koko	kokore
sour	katyala	katala
basket	koho	tohe
bathe	koaha	nakohã
arrive	kaoka	takwa

== Phonology ==
=== Consonants ===
Enawene Nawe is described by Zorthêa (2006) as having 15 contrastive consonants.

Consonant inventory
		Labial	Alveolar	Post-alv./ Palatal	Velar	Glottal
Plosive	voiceless	kʷ ⟨kw⟩	t ⟨t⟩	kʲ ⟨ky⟩	k ⟨k⟩	
Plosive	voiced		d ⟨d⟩			
Nasal		m ⟨m⟩	n ⟨n⟩	ɲ ⟨ñ⟩		
Flap			ɾ ⟨r⟩			
Fricative			s ⟨s⟩	ʃ ⟨x⟩		h ⟨h⟩
Approximant		w ⟨w⟩	l ⟨l⟩	j ⟨y⟩		

Among these, the following allophonic variations are reported:

Consonant variations
Type		Examples
⟨w⟩	varies between [w] and [b] in word-initial position before the front vowels /e/ and /i/	⟨wesera⟩ "to drink": [weseɾa~beseɾa]; ⟨wera⟩ "itch": [weɾa~beɾa]
⟨m⟩	varies between [m] and [w]	⟨datamare⟩ "(mythical character)": [datamaɾe~datawaɾe]; ⟨Alame⟩ "(proper noun)": [alame~alawe]
⟨d⟩	varies between [d], [s], [ɾ] and [l]	⟨datowa⟩ "tomorrow": [datowa~latowa]; ⟨derohi⟩ "ritual step": [deɾohi~leɾohi]; ⟨edoa⟩ "to fall": [edoa~eɾoa]
⟨r⟩	varies between [ɾ] and [l]	⟨Kawari⟩ "(proper noun)": [kawaɾi~kawali]; ⟨korito⟩ "corn": [koɾito~kolito]
⟨k⟩	varies between [k] and [g] between vowels	⟨nawenekota⟩ "I think": [nawenekota~nawenegota]
⟨ky⟩	varies between [kʲ] and [gʲ] between vowels	
⟨t⟩	varies between [t] and [d] between vowels	⟨atana⟩ "thunder": [atana~adana]; ⟨meta⟩ "tickle": [meta~meda]

=== Vowels ===
Enawene Nawe is described by Zorthêa (2006) as having 4 oral vowels and 4 nasal vowels.

Oral
	Front	Back
Near-Close	i ⟨i⟩	o~u ⟨o⟩
Mid	e~ɪ ⟨e⟩	o~u ⟨o⟩
Open	a ⟨a⟩	

Nasal
	Front	Back
Near-Close	ĩ ⟨ĩ⟩	õ~ũ ⟨õ⟩
Mid	ẽ~ĩ ⟨ẽ⟩	õ~ũ ⟨õ⟩
Open	ʌ̃ ⟨ã⟩	

== Grammar ==
=== Pronouns ===
Independent personal pronouns
Person	Singular	Plural
1st	nato	wixo
2nd	hixo	dexo
3rd	ere	erenaha

=== Numerals ===
The first eleven numbers in Enawene Nawe are as follows:

Number	Enawene Nawe
1	xoxola
2	initini
3	koytala
4	noxi
5	monarese, eswe
6	lolokwate
7	lolate
8	hoxiro
9	mamalakari
10	ketera
11	darayti

Zorthêa (2006) notes that all numbers except initini (2) and monarese (5) can be preceded and followed by affixes.

=== Affixes ===
Enawene Nawe makes use of a variety of suffixes and prefixes to derive different meanings from root words.

==== Gender suffixes ====
Zorthêa (2006) describes Enawene Nawe as having two suffixes to explicitly mark gender: -lo for the feminine gender and -re for the masculine. De Almeida (2015), however, notes four suffixes: -nero and -lo mark the feminine gender, while -nere and -li mark the masculine.

Examples from de Almeida (2015):

- Towalinero "a Towali woman"
- Towalinere "a Towali man"
- Iyakaloti "a female spirit"
- Iyakaliti "a male spirit"

==== Place suffix ====
The suffix -kwa is used to mark places and is commonly found in village names. For example, the name of the Enawene Nawe village Matokodakwa is ultimately derived from matokoda, meaning "container for transporting liquids", and -kwa "place".
