= Wiriná language =

Arawakan language

Wiriná
- Uirina
- Native to: Brazil
- Region: Rio Negro
- Extinct: after 19th century
- Language family: Arawakan: Northern; Upper Amazonian; (unclassified); Wiriná

Language codes
- ISO 639-3: None (mis)
- Glottolog: uiri1238

Wiriná (Uirina) is an extinct, poorly attested, and unclassified Arawakan language. It is known only from the wordlists of Johann Natterer and Carl Friedrich Philipp von Martius, recorded in the 19th century. Both Kaufman (1994) and Aikhenvald (1999) leave it unclassified within Northern Arawakan.

== See also ==
- Waraikú, another extinct language recorded by von Martius
