= Cabiyari language =

South American aboriginal language

Cabiyarí
- Kawillari
- Native to: Colombia, Venezuela
- Region: Cananarí River
- Native speakers: 270 (2008)
- Language family: Arawakan: Northern; Upper Amazon; Western Nawiki; Piapoko; Cabiyarí

Language codes
- ISO 639-3: cbb
- Glottolog: cabi1241
- ELP: Cabiyarí
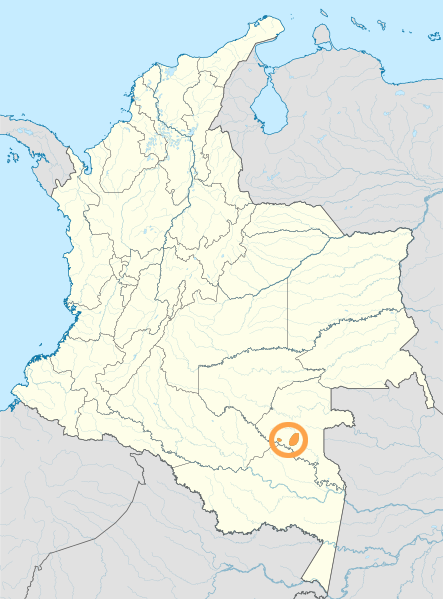

Cabiyarí (Caviyari) is an Arawakan language spoken along the Cananarí River in the Vaupes Region of Colombia in north western South America. The name is also spelled Cabiuarí, Cauyarí, Kauyarí, Cuyare, Kawillary.
