= Wainumá-Mariaté language =

Extinct Arawakan language

Wainumá–Mariaté
- Inabishana
- Native to: Brazil
- Region: Amazonas
- Extinct: after 1851
- Language family: Arawakan: Northern; Upper Amazonian; Japurá-Colômbia; Wainumá–Mariaté
- Dialects: Wainumá; Mariaté

Language codes
- ISO 639-3: None (mis)
- Glottolog: uain1239
- Linguasphere: 82-AFC-aa

Wainumá (Wainambu, Wainambɨ, Wainumá: Inabishana) and Mariaté are dialects of an extinct, poorly attested, and unclassified Arawakan language.

== Classification ==
Kaufman (1994) placed them in his Wainumá branch, but this is not followed in Aikhenvald (1999). It is placed in the Japurá-Colômbia branch by Ramirez and França (2019).

== Word lists ==
Word lists of Wainumá have been collected by:

- Spix and Martius in 1820
- Johann Natterer in 1832
- Alfred Russel Wallace in 1851

A word list of Mariaté was recorded by Spix and Martius in 1820.

Wainumá vocabulary
Wainumá	Gloss	Wainumá	Gloss
pipina	abeas	nioho, eroânyhênery	avus
eidirikeno	aegroto	noiracká, tschaberaka uhny	bibo
amáhrăĭ-ápe	aër	nucotanahbihta	bellum genere
kési	adeps	mísare	bonus, a, um
