= Resígaro language =

Arawakan language of Peru

Resígaro
- Native to: Peru
- Region: Department of Loreto
- Ethnicity: Resígaro
- Native speakers: 1 (2017)
- Language family: Arawakan: Northern; Upper Amazon; Western Nawiki; Resígaro

Language codes
- ISO 639-3: rgr
- Glottolog: resi1247
- ELP: Resígaro

Resígaro is an Arawakan language spoken in the department of Loreto in Peru. It is believed to be nearly extinct as of 2017 with only one remaining speaker.

== Classification ==
Aikhenvald (1999) classifies it among the Western Nawiki Upper Amazonian languages. Kaufman (1994) had made it a separate branch of Upper Amazonian. The language has been erroneously classified as belonging to the Witotoan languages, though this is actually due to extensive language contact between Resigaro and Bora.

== History ==
In 1971 to 1972, there were only four adult and six child speakers of Resigaro left in Puerto Izango. Other people who identified as Resigaro could speak only Ocaina instead. One other woman who was married to a Bora could also speak Resigaro, but she rarely spoke the language at all.

On November 25, 2016, the last female speaker of Resígaro, Rosa Andrade Ocagane, was brutally murdered in a beheading at the age of 67. Her niece reported “She was beheaded. Her head was not found, neither her heart.”

The only other remaining speaker known is Andrade's brother, Pablo Andrade Ocagane, who still lives. He and his late sister had been preparing a project with the Ministry of Culture to document their language since October 2016, and to update books on grammar and an outdated dictionary made in the 1950s by the Summer Institute of Linguistics, that promoted the translation of the Bible.

=== Language contact ===
Resígaro has many morphological borrowings from Bora, such as pronouns, number markings, and case markers. However, there are relatively few lexical loanwords.

== Phonology ==
Consonants
| | | Labial | Alveolar | Palatal | Velar | Glottal |
|---|---|---|---|---|---|---|
| Plosive | aspirated | pʰ | tʰ | | kʰ | |
| Plosive | voiceless | p | t | tʲ | k | ʔ |
| Plosive | voiced | b | d | dʲ | g | |
| Affricate | aspirated | | t͡sʰ | c͡çʰ | | |
| Affricate | voiceless | | t͡s | c͡ç | | |
| Affricate | voiced | | d͡z | ɟ͡ʝ | | |
| Fricative | voiceless | f | s | ç | | h |
| Fricative | voiced | v | | ʝ | | |
| Nasal | voiceless | m̥ | n̥ | ɲ̥ | | |
| Nasal | voiced | m | n | ɲ | | |

Vowels
| | Front | Central | Back |
|---|---|---|---|
| High | i | | u |
| Mid | e | | o |
| Low | | a | |
