= Kustenau language =

Extinct Arawakan language of Brazil

Kustenaú
- Kustenau
- Native to: Brazil
- Region: Mato Grosso
- Ethnicity: Custenau people
- Extinct: late 20th century
- Language family: Arawakan: Southern ?; Paresí–Xingu; Waurá; Kustenaú

Language codes
- ISO 639-3: None (mis)
- Glottolog: kust1238

Kustenau (Kustenaú) is an extinct Arawakan language of Brazil.

== Phonology ==
=== Vowels ===
Kustenau has the vowels /i, e, ɨ, u, a/.

=== Consonants ===
The consonants are /p, t, k, m, n, s, ʐ, h, ʦ, ʧ, ɾ, l, w, j/.

== Vocabulary ==
Unless specified, stress always falls on the penultimate syllable.

Kustenau vocabulary
Gloss	Kustenau
tongue	nunéi
tooth	nutévoe
mouth	nukanati
