= Apolista =

Group of Bolivian indigenous peoples

Apolista is a native South American nation of western Bolivia. Sedentary farmers, hunters, gatherers and fishers, they spoke an Arawakan language, the Apolista language, now gravely endangered, if not extinct. From 1713, they were gathered at a variety of missions with other nations, and rapidly lost their traditional culture to the point that a realistic census count is no longer possible.

== Sources ==
- MacKenzie, John M., ed. (2005). Peoples, nations and cultures: an A-Z of the peoples of the world, past and present. London: Weidenfeld & Nicolson. ISBN 978-0-304-36550-0.
