= Mepuri language =

Extinct Arawakan language of Brazil

Mepuri
- Native to: Brazil
- Region: Amazonas
- Extinct: (date missing)
- Language family: Arawakan: Northern; Mepuri

Language codes
- ISO 639-3: None (mis)
- Glottolog: mepu1234

Mepuri (Meppuri) is an extinct Arawakan language of Brazil that was spoken around the confluence of the Rio Negro and Japurá River, mainly on the Marié River and Curicuriari River. A word list was collected by Johann Natterer in 1831.

== Classification ==
Mepuri is grouped as a member of the Japurá-Colômbia branch by Ramirez and França (2019).
