= Amarizana language =

Arawakan language of Colombia

Amarizana
- Amarizama
- Native to: Colombia
- Region: Meta Department
- Extinct: after 1824
- Language family: Arawakan: Northern; Upper Amazonian; (unclassified); Amarizana

Language codes
- ISO 639-3: None (mis)
- Glottolog: None acha1250 Achagua (sources cited there)

Amarizana (Amarizama) is an extinct, poorly attested, and unclassified Arawakan language. It is attested in a wordlist from 1824.

== Classification ==
Kaufman (1994) placed it in his Piapoko branch, but this is not followed in Aikhenvald (1999).
