= Cararí language =

Extinct Arawakan language of Brazil

Cararí
- Kararí
- Native to: Brazil
- Region: Mucuim River, Amazonas
- Extinct: (date missing)
- Language family: Arawakan: Southern; Purus; Cararí

Language codes
- ISO 639-3: None (mis)
- Glottolog: cara1273

Cararí (Kararí) is an extinct Arawakan language of Brazil that was spoken on the Mucuim River, a tributary of the Purus River. Ramirez (2019) classifies Cararí as one of the Purus languages.

A 72-word list was collected by Johann Natterer in 1833.
