= Kariaí language =

Extinct Arawakan language of Brazil

Kariaí
- Cariyai
- Native to: Brazil
- Region: Roraima
- Extinct: 19th century
- Language family: Arawakan: Northern; Upper Amazonian; (unclassified); Kariaí

Language codes
- ISO 639-3: None (mis)
- Glottolog: cari1280
- Linguasphere: 82-AJB-aa

Kariaí (Cariyai) is an extinct, poorly attested, and unclassified Arawakan language. It is documented in a wordlist by Carl Friedrich Philipp von Martius in the 1810s.

== Classification ==
Kaufman (1994) placed it in his Manao (Middle Rio Negro) branch, but this is not followed in Aikhenvald (1999).
