= Marawan language =

Extinct Arawakan language of Brazil

Marawán
- Native to: Brazil
- Ethnicity: Palikur people
- Extinct: early 20th century
- Language family: Arawakan: Northern; Palikuran; Marawán

Language codes
- ISO 639-3: None (mis)
- Glottolog: mara1408
- Linguasphere: 82-AEA-ab

Marawán is an extinct Arawakan language of Brazil. It is known only from a wordlist published by Paul Rivet and Pierre Reinburg in 1921.

== Vocabulary ==
Marawan vocabulary
Marawan	gloss
kutru	agouti
paaktexą	tree
katnexą	two trees
pladno	banana
ilapa, īrăpă	to drink
pi-biu, pe-beiu	banana
pu-ana, pu-anį	arm
tsērnŭtĭ	hair
peolo	dog
inni	sky
e	God
ximēkuī	to sleep
ūnĭ	water
