= Yaloupi =

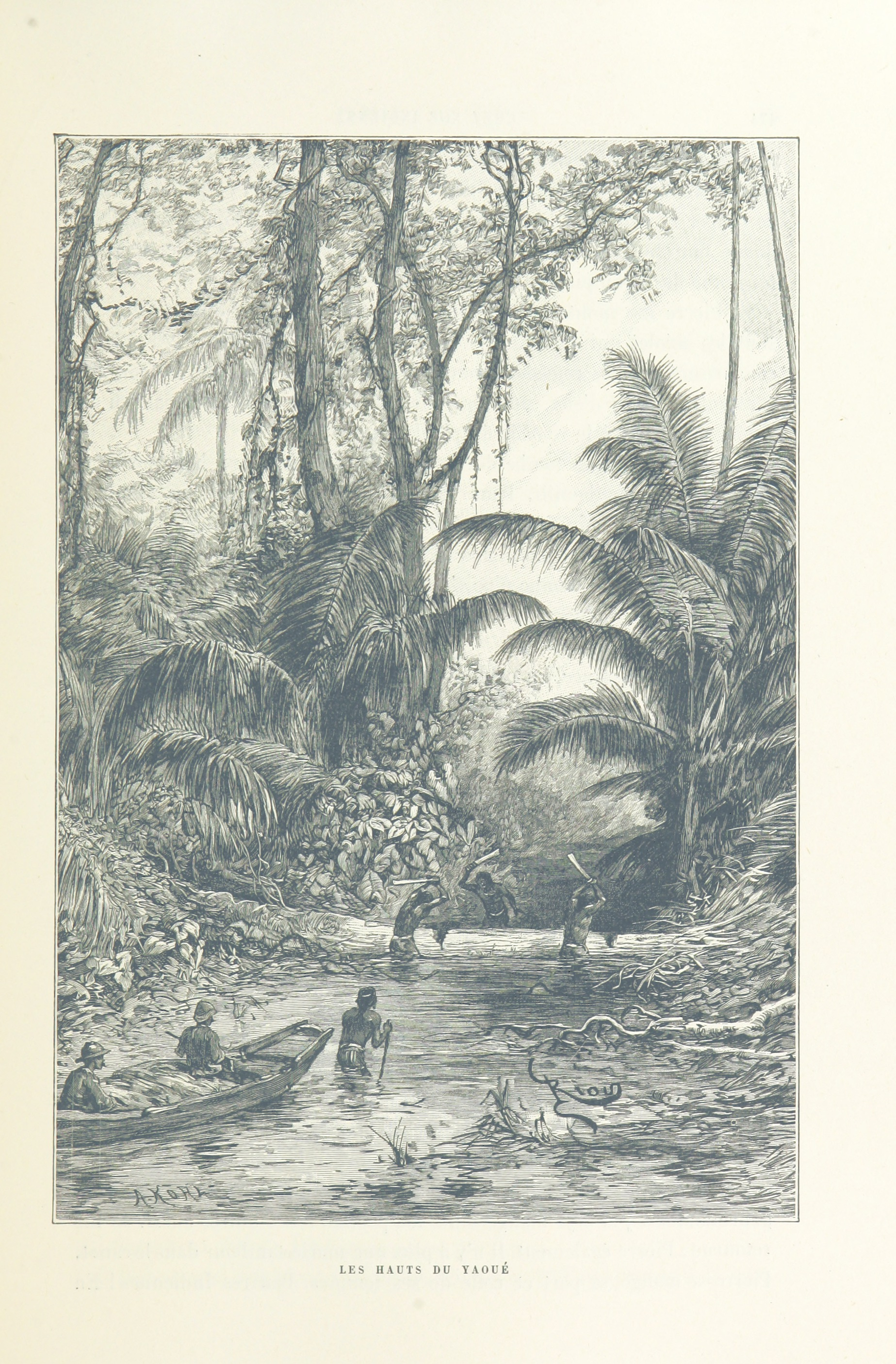

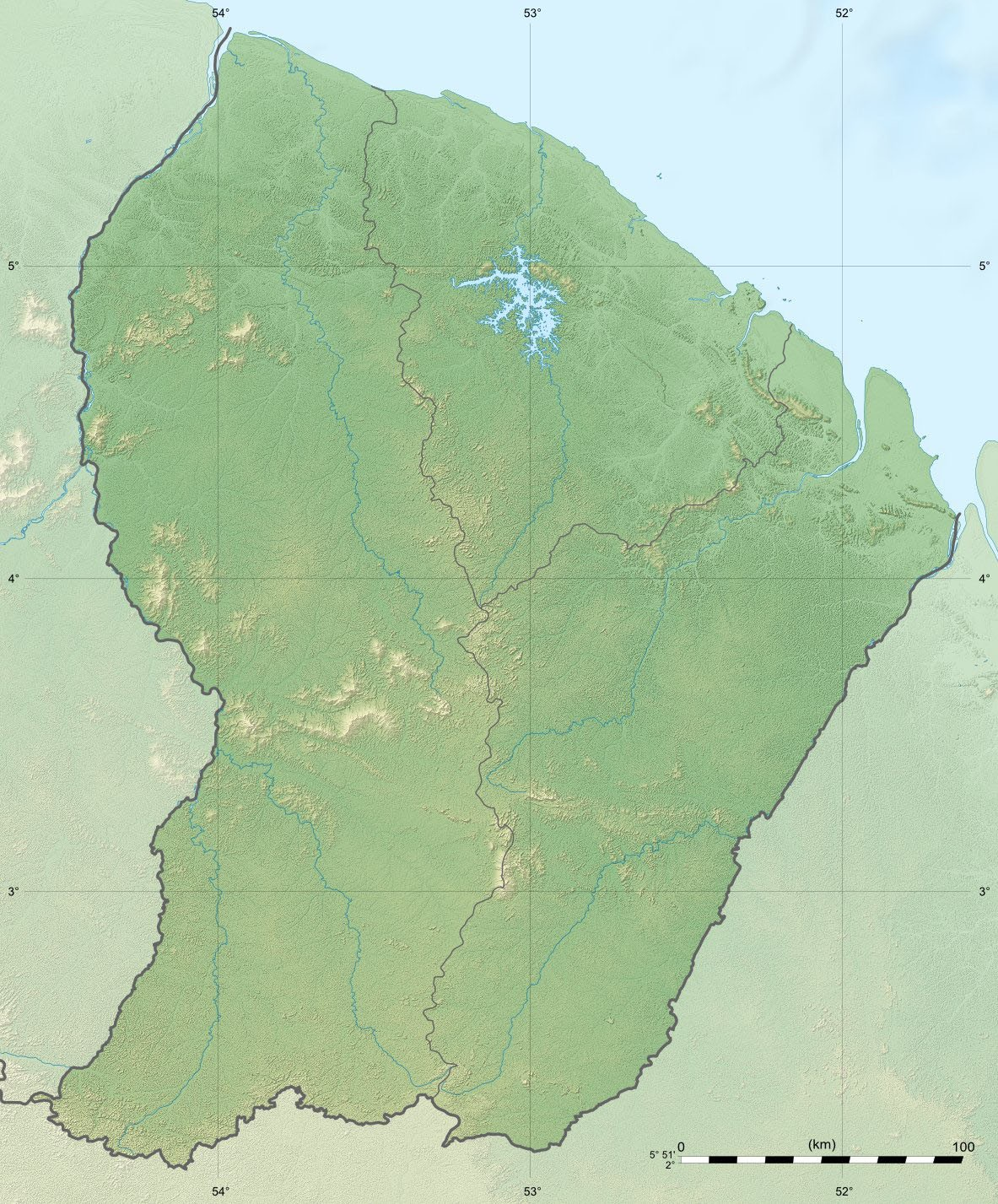
- Location within French Guiana

Location
- Country: France
- Region: French Guiana

Physical characteristics
- Mouth: Oyapock
  - coordinates: 2.7809°N 52.4782°W
- Length: 113 km (70 mi)

Basin features
- Progression: Oyapock→ Atlantic Ocean

The Yaloupi or Yaroupi is a river in French Guiana. It rises in the south of the country, flowing northeast until it reaches the river Oyapock near the temporary village of Oscar. It is 113 km (70 mi) long.
