= Chamicuro language =

Nearly extinct Arawakan language of Peru

Chamicuro
- Chamicolo, Chamicura
- Chamekolo
- Pronunciation: [ˌt͡ʃameˈkod͡ɮo]
- Native to: Peru
- Region: Pampa Hermosa
- Ethnicity: 100 Chamicuro (2015)
- Native speakers: 8 (2008)
- Language family: Arawakan: Southern; Western; Chamicuro
- Writing system: Latin script

Language codes
- ISO 639-3: ccc
- Glottolog: cham1318
- ELP: Chamicuro

Chamicuro (Chamicuro: Chamekolo [ˌt͡ʃameˈkod͡ɮo], referring to a type of worm) is a nearly extinct South American language spoken in Peru. The language was used by the Chamicuro people, who number around one hundred people. The Chamicuros currently live on a tributary of the Huallaga river, in Peru, in an area called Pampa Hermosa, though many had been dislocated to the Yavarí and Napo Rivers and to Brazil.

== Status ==
As with all native languages in Peru, Chamicuro was by default an official language in the area in which it was spoken. A dictionary has been published by the Chamicuro, however no children can speak the language as the community has shifted to Spanish.

== Classification ==
Chamicuro is an Arawakan language. However, it has been historically claimed to be a member of the Panoan language family instead; Julian Steward, writing in the Handbook of South American Indians, claimed that Chamicuro was linguistically close to Shipibo, a Panoan language.

There is dispute as to whether the unattested language of the Aguano people was the same language as, or related to, Chamicuro. Čestmír Loukotka (1968) had identified it as a relative of Chamicuro, but the Chamicuro report that the Aguano people spoke Quechua.

== Phonology ==
=== Vowels ===
Chamicuro has five vowels: /a, e, i, o, u/. All vowels have both short and long forms, though long vowels are rare. It is not a tonal language.

=== Consonants ===
Consonants in Chamicuro
| | Bilabial | Alveolar | Palato- alveolar | Retroflex | Palatal | Velar | Glottal |
|---|---|---|---|---|---|---|---|
| Plosive | p | t | | | | k | ʔ |
| Affricate | | t͡s | t͡ʃ | ʈʂ | | | |
| Fricative | | s | ʃ | ʂ | | | h |
| Nasal | m | n | | | ɲ | | |
| Lateral | | l | | | ʎ | | |
| Flap | | ɾ | | | | | |
| Semivowel | | | | | j | w | |

/l w j/ devoice to /ɬ ʍ ȷ̊/ at the end of a syllable:

/yelna/ [ˈjɛɬna] 'man, husband'

/kawsa/ [ˈkaʍsa] 'smoke'

A laminal alveolar fricative [s̻] occurs in Chamicuro as a realization of underlying /ʃ/, /ʃi/.

== Typology ==
Chamicuro is an agglutinative language and has basic verb–subject–object word order. It distinguishes inalienable and alienable possession but not gender.
