= Paunaka language =

Endangered Arawakan language in Bolivia

Pauna
- Paunaka
- Paunaka, betea
- Pronunciation: [ˈpau.na.ka]
- Native to: Bolivia
- Region: Santa Cruz Department (Bolivia): Chiquitanía
- Ethnicity: 150 Pauna
- Native speakers: 8 (2023)
- Language family: Arawakan: Southern; Bolivia–Parana; Moxos; Pauna

Language codes
- ISO 639-3: pnk
- Glottolog: paun1241
- ELP: Paunaka
- Linguasphere: 82-BDB-ca

The Pauna language (Paunaca, Paunaka, Paunaka: betea 'our language') is an Arawakan language in South America. It is an extremely endangered language, which belongs to the southern branch of the Arawakan language family and it is spoken in the Bolivian area of the Chiquitanía, near Santa Cruz and north of the Chaco region. The suffix -ka is a plural morpheme of the Chiquitano language, but has been assimilated into Pauna.

== Classification ==
There could be a relationship to the extinct Paiconeca language, which is also part of the Arawakan family. Aikhenvald (1999) lists Paiconeca as a separate language, but Kaufman (1994) subsumed it as a dialect of Pauna.

== History ==
The Spanish colonisation changed a whole continent. Indigenous languages were displaced and replaced and younger generations did not keep in touch with their linguistic roots anymore. Spanish and Chiquitano became the main languages in this Bolivian area, and Spanish is especially the medium of teaching in schools. Due to this, children are focusing on Spanish instead of their original languages. Currently, there remain approximately ten speakers and semi-speakers, who live in the eastern part of Bolivia among the Chiquitano people. However, 150 people feel to be part of the ethnic group, of which some can still understand Paunaka. The Paunaka language and culture is currently under investigation.

== Phonology ==
The stress in the Paunaka is described as based on morae rather than syllables. In most words with three or more morae, the main accent falls on the last iambic foot, counting from left to right. The secondary accent occurs every other foot. Bimoraic words have a trochaic accent, meaning the main accent falls on the first mora.

The basic syllable structure in the Paunaka language is CV. Syllables without an onset consonant are permissible, as long as they occur word-initially. There are instances of vowel sequences occurring (1) in the same syllable, (e.g., kupisaire ‘fox’), and (2) across morpheme boundaries (e.g., niuma ‘my grandfather).

=== Consonants ===
	Bilabial	Alveolar	Postalveolar	Retroflex	Palatal	Velar	Glottal
Nasal	m ⟨m⟩	n ⟨n⟩			ɲ ⟨ny⟩		
Plosive	p ⟨p⟩	t ⟨t⟩				k ⟨k⟩	
Fricative	β ⟨b⟩	s ⟨s⟩	(ʃ) ⟨xh⟩	(ʂ) ⟨x⟩			h ⟨j⟩
Affricate		tʃ ⟨ch⟩					
Flap		ɾ ⟨r⟩					
Semivowel					j ⟨y⟩		

The phoneme /β/ can be realised as [b], [w] or [v].

The postalveolar fricative /ʃ/ and the retroflex fricative /ʂ/ are non-native phonemes that arrived to Paunaka via the Bésiro language.

All vowels and diphthongs following /h/ become nasalised.

=== Vowels ===
	Front	Central	Back
High	i ⟨i⟩	ɨ ⟨ÿ⟩	u ⟨u⟩
Mid	ɛ ⟨e⟩		
Low		a ⟨a⟩	

The phoneme /ɨ/ is very unstable, and may be realised as [ə] or [ʊ] in casual speech.

The mid /ɛ/ can centralize and be realised as [ə] in unaccented syllables.

The modern Paunaka language has only one back rounded vowel /u/, but comparative analysis with Proto-Mojeño and Terena suggests that it comes from a system with two back rounded vowels /u/ and /o/.

== Orthography ==
Paunaka is not a written language and most of the remaining speakers are illiterate.

== Morphosyntax ==
Paunaka is a head-marking, polysynthetic language.

In her paper, Terhart proposes the word “marker” as a neutral term encompassing affixes, clitics, and borderline cases. A number of markers in the Paunaka language have low selectivity, meaning they can be affixed to different parts of speech, such as nouns, verbs, and adjectives. The grammatical functions of those markers include: person and number; plurality; reality status (realis, irrealis); time, aspect, mood, and evidentiality; degree markers (e.g., the intensifier); case.

=== Nouns ===
In the Paunaka language, there are three classes of nouns depending on their relationship to the possession marker: inalienable, alienable, and non-possessable.

Inalienable nouns must express the possessor using the person marker appended before the possessed.

ni-imu pi-ati ukuine
1SG-see 2SG-brother yesterday
‘I saw your brother yesterday.’

Alienable nouns may but need not take a possessive marker. Among them, there are two subclasses: nouns that can be directly marked with the possessor marker (e.g., yumaji ‘hammock’ → niyumaji ‘my hammock’), and those that require an additional suffix -ne in the possessive form (e.g., sÿki ‘basket’ → nÿsÿkine ‘my basket’).

In the case of human referents, the plural is marked obligatorily with the marker -nube. In the case of non-human referents, usually animate, the distributive marker -jane can be used to mark the plural. The collective marker -ji is used with nouns referring to things occurring in mass or in a swarm, and with kinship terms marked with a plural marker.

Nouns can be marked as irrealis by adding the suffix -ina. Nominal irrealis is a grammatical category that means that a noun refers to something presupposed that has not yet come into existence. In the sentence below, the speaker uses nominal irrealis to describe the pants he should have received from his employer, but did not. The pants existed only in his expectations:

kuina ti-punaka-ne ni-kasune-ina
NEG 3i-give.IRR-1SG 1SG-trousers-IRR.NV
‘He didn’t give me my [supposed] trousers.’

In another example, the nominal irrealis refers to a field that the boy will create in the future. At the time of the statement, the field does not yet exist:

chejepuine echÿu aitubuchepÿi ti-jÿka-tu ti-yuna-ji ti-ebitaka chi-sane-ina
because DEM boy 3.V-grow.IRR-IAM 3.V-go.IRR-HSY 3.V-clear.IRR 3-field-IRR.NV
‘Because once the boy has grown up, he will go and clear his future field, it is said.’

To mark the locative case, -yae is attached to nouns expressing spatial relations in a sentence, such as place, purpose, or source. It expresses the most expected spatial relations, and its interpretation as “on,” “in,” or “at” depends on the context and nature of the noun denoting location. The locative marker can be omitted when the spatial relation refers to a proper name or when the context is obvious. To express “inside”, the classifier -kÿ or the stem -j(ÿ)ekÿ (“inside”) is used, which may or may not then be combined with the locative marker -yae. For other spatial relations, e.g., “under,” “next to,” “on,” relational nouns are used, which are directly juxtaposed with the noun denoting the location. Relational nouns take the locative marker -yae, and the noun denoting the location acts as a possessor.

The Paunaka language has one diminutive marker, -mÿnÿ, which can be added to various parts of speech, including nouns, verbs, adjectives, and, less frequently, to demonstrative pronouns and numerals. It is used to express smallness; affection, sympathy; modesty, pity; or to soften the meaning of a verb:

ti-bebeiku-bu-mÿnÿ michi-mÿnÿ
3.V-lie-MID-DIM cat-DIM
‘the little cute cat is lying (on a chair)’

ti-ekicha-mÿnÿ ÿne
3.V-invite.IRR-DIM water
‘she gives it water’

=== Verbs ===
Verbs in the Paunaka language can be divided into two main classes: stative and active.

Stative verbs are usually non-transitive, and describe states, qualities or characteristics. However, some stative verbs can take an object in the form of a noun phrase or a verbal complement; such exception can be seen with the verb -(i)chuna ‘be capable, know’:

bien pi-ichuna-yenu paunaka
well 2SG-be.capable-DED Paunaka
‘“you must know Paunaka well”’

Active verbs can be transitive, intransitive, or (rarely) ditransitive, and describe actions. They can undergo various derivational processes, such as: reduplication, affixation of aspect markers, affixation of a classifier, and noun incorporation. Active verbs can change their valence by attaching the following markers: benefactive, causative, and reciprocal. While the causative markers precede the verb stem, the benefactive and reciprocal markers follow.

Both static and active verbs are conjugated by persons with person markers placed before the verb stem, which is unusual for Arawakan languages. However, these two types of verbs differ in the place of the irrealis marker: in stative verbs, this marker occurs before the stem, while in active verbs it occurs after the stem.

Markers that can be appended to verbs include: person and plurality; reality status; associated motion; aspect; tense; modality; evidentiality.

The middle voice in Paunaka is expressed with the -bu (after realis) and -pu (after irrealis) markers. Although middle voice does not have a uniform meaning, it is usually used to express an alternative view of an event in which aspects less relevant to the speaker's point of view are not expressed. Such a marker can: indicate that the subject performs the action on themself; indicate that the action happened spontaneously, without the participation of the agent; or suggest a longer duration of the action than the active form. In some contexts, this marker can be used to express a meaning similar to the passive voice of European languages, likely influenced particularly by Spanish.

=== Pronouns ===
There are personal pronouns for the first and second-person singular and plural, but no pronoun for the third person. They are formed by combining the person marker with the morpheme -ti, which is probably related to the non-possessed marker -ti. Personal pronouns are used for special emphasis and usually occur in a position before the verb.

The Paunaka language has three demonstrative pronouns: eka, echÿu, and nechÿu. Eka and echÿu are nominal demonstratives that can occur alone as pronouns or function as adjectives. There is no clear proximity distinction—both can refer to objects both near and far from the speaker. There are some indications that originally eka may have been proximal and echÿu meant medial distance, but this distinction has since disappeared. Both these pronouns can introduce subordinate clauses, although echÿu is more commonly used in this context. Eka can also act as a conjunct, linking sentences, but this is less common. It can also be used as a filler hesitation (comparable to English “uhm”). Nechÿu is a demonstrative with a nominal or adverbial function, referring to objects or places distant from both the speaker and the interlocutor. Unlike eka and echÿu, nechÿu is not used to introduce relative clauses or as a conjunct.

Interrogative pronouns are used to form questions about various elements of a sentence and usually occupy a position at the beginning of a sentence. The same forms act as both interrogative and indefinite pronouns: chija ‘what, who’ and juchubu ‘where’ can be used as ‘something, someone’ and ‘somewhere,’ respectively.

=== Adjectives ===
The existence of a separate grammatical class of adjectives in the Paunaka language is debatable. Sources indicate that there are a small number of adjectives, and most of the concepts describing features are expressed with stative verbs. Nevertheless, some words in the Paunaka language show characteristics of adjectives and are classified as such.

Adjectives in the Paunaka language are most often used predicatively rather than attributively.

Person markers after the adjective stem are rare, which may be due to the fact that adjectives usually refer to third persons. The only adjective that can take person markers is micha ‘good’ and its derivations.

The difference between adjectives and nouns can be seen in their behavior when combined with classifiers. Adjectives with classifiers describe the properties (mainly shape) of the designator, while nouns with classifiers form new nouns denoting a new designator. However, many words that could be considered adjectives on the basis of semantics also exhibit features of other grammatical classes, such as nouns.

=== Numerals ===
The Paunaka language has only one native numeral, chÿnachÿ, meaning “one.” It is presumed that “chÿ” corresponds to the third person marker, and “-na” is the default classifier (as all numerals in related languages take a classifier). There is no consensus as for the etymology of the last “chÿ”. All numerals with a value greater than one were borrowed from Spanish, with varying degrees of integration into the Paunaka language. The numerals ruschÿ ‘two’ and treschÿ ‘three’ (both loaned from Spanish) are more integrated and, like chÿnachÿ, contain the “-chÿ” ending. For numerals larger than three, the presence of “-chÿ” is less expected, and depends on the speaker.
