= Güejar River =

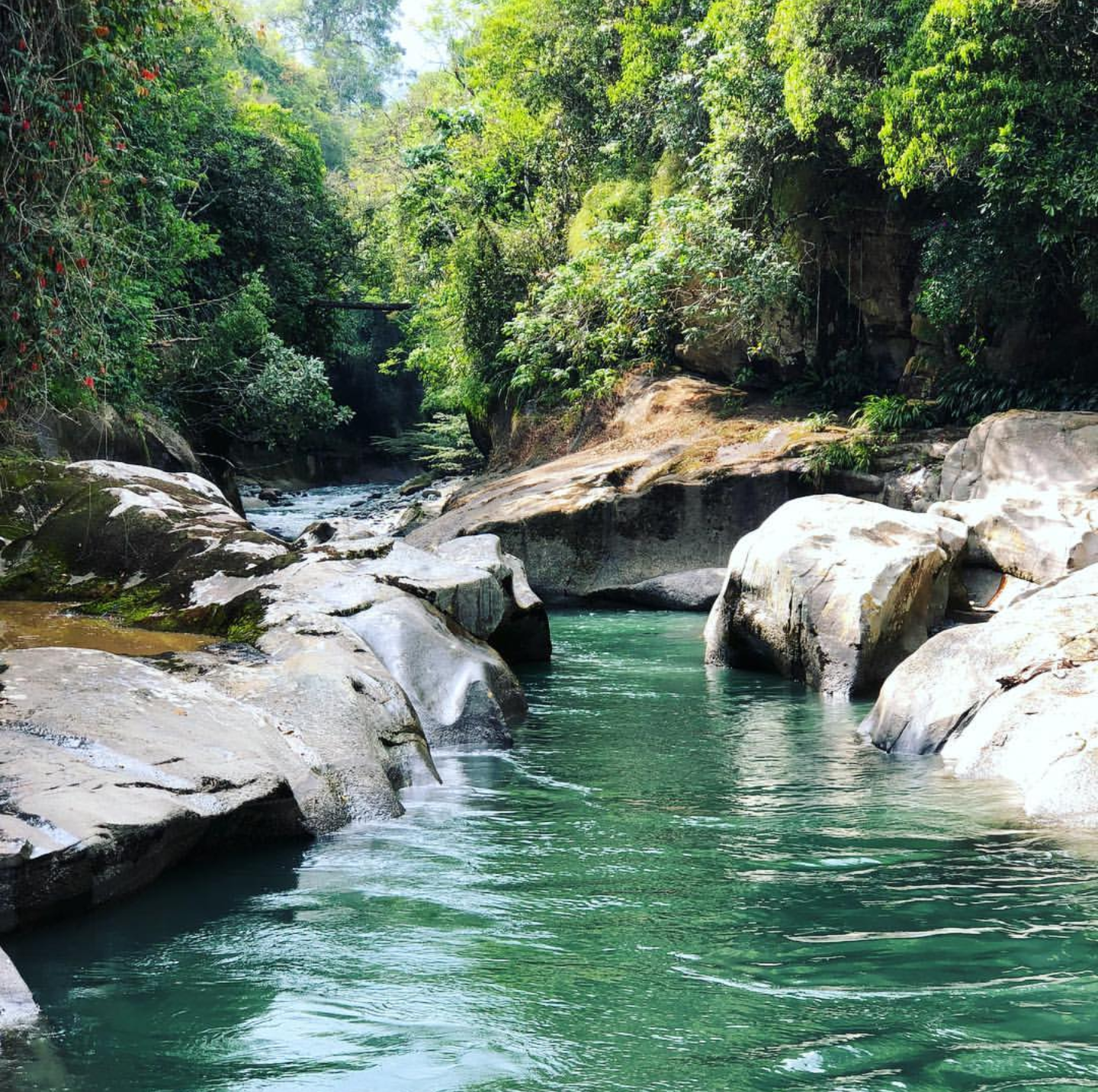

Location
- Country: Colombia

Güejar River is a river of Colombia. It is part of the Orinoco River basin.

== Geography ==
Güejar River flows from the Cordillera Oriental.

== See also ==
- List of rivers of Colombia
