= Yavitero language =

Likely extinct Maipurean language of Venezuela

Yavitero
- Paraene
- Native to: Venezuela
- Region: Orinoco
- Ethnicity: Yavitero
- Extinct: 1984; 1 (2000)
- Language family: Arawakan: Northern; Upper Amazonian; Orinoco; Yavitero languages; Yavitero

Language codes
- ISO 639-3: yvt
- Glottolog: yavi1244
- ELP: Yavitero

Yavitero or Paraene is an extinct Maipurean language of Venezuela.

== Phonology ==
Vowels
	Front	Central	Back
Close	i		u
Mid	ɛ		
Open		a	

Consonants
		Labial	Dental	Alveolar	Palatal	Velar	Glottal
Nasal		m	n		ɲ		
Plosive		p b	t d			k g	
Affricate				t͡s d͡z			
Fricative			θ				h
Rhotic	tap			ɾ			
Rhotic	trill			r			
Lateral Tap				ɺ̥ ɺ			
Semivowel					j	w	
