= Baré language =

Arawakan language of Venezuela and Brazil

Baré
- Barawana, Mitua
- Native to: Venezuela, Brazil
- Ethnicity: 16,516 Baré people (2011–2014)
- Extinct: 2 February 1993, with the death of Candelário da Silva; 6 rememberers (2001)
- Language family: Arawakan: Northern; Upper Amazon; Central (Orinoco); Baré
- Dialects: Ihini; Arihini

Language codes
- ISO 639-3: bae
- Glottolog: bare1276
- ELP: Baré
- Linguasphere: 82-AHA-b

Baré (Barawana) is an extinct Arawakan language of Venezuela and Brazil. Its last fluent speaker, Candelário da Silva, died in 1993, but six of the Baré people, as of 2001, still remembered something of the language; the rest have switched to Nheengatu, a Tupian language, Spanish, or Portuguese. It is closely related to a number of extinct languages, such as Guinau and Mandawaca.

== History ==
Bare was one of the most widely spoken languages in the upper Rio Negro around the 19th to 20th centuries. In fact, the name "Bare", along with "Baria" and "Barauna", was used as a generic term for all Indigenous peoples of the region beginning in the early 19th century. Between 1908 and 1921, many Indigenous people migrated from Venezuela to Brazil. It is implied from historical descriptions that the Bare were acculturated early on, leading to the replacement of Bare with the local lingua franca Nheengatu, and later on by Spanish and Portuguese. As of 1988, only 19 people in Venezuela and 4 in Brazil could speak Bare, all of them "well over fifty". The last fluent speaker in Brazil, Candelário da Silva, died on 2 February 1993.

== Classification ==
Terrence Kaufman (1994) considered Baré proper, as well as the extinct and closely related Arawakan languages Guinau and Marawá, to be distinct languages; Alexandra Aikhenvald (1999), dialects of a single language.

== Dialects ==
Two principal subdivisions are recognized within Bare, Ihini 'the ones from there' and Arihini 'the ones from here'. According to a Baré speaker, the extinct Mandawaca language was mutually intelligible with Baré.

== Phonology ==
=== Vowels ===
Four vowels are present in Bare:

| | Front | Central | Back |
|---|---|---|---|
| Close | i | | u |
| Mid | e | | |
| Open | | a | |

Bare also has four diphthongs, being aw, ay, ew, and ey.

=== Consonants ===
20 consonant phonemes occur in Bare.

| | | Labial | Alveolar | Palatal | Velar | Glottal |
|---|---|---|---|---|---|---|
| Stop | voiceless | p | t | | k | |
| Stop | aspirated | pʰ | tʰ | | kʰ | |
| Stop | voiced | b | d | | (g) | |
| Affricate | | | | t͡ʃ | | |
| Fricative | | | s | | | h |
| Flap | | | ɾ | | | |
| Nasal | aspirated | m̥ | n̥ | | | |
| Nasal | unaspirated | m | n | | | |
| Sonorant | aspirated | | | | w̥ | |
| Sonorant | unaspirated | | | j | w | |

Aspirated consonants are mostly restricted at the beginning of a word or morpheme. They can be intrinsically aspirated, or derived from phonological processes, and can be realized as unaspirated in unstressed syllables. Unaspirated stops can aso be realized as unaspirated word- or morpheme-initial position. /tʰ/ is rare and never derived. In stressed syllables, /t͡ʃ/ can be aspirated as well. Before the vowel /i/, /t/ can be retroflexed to /ʈ/. In some dialects, these two allophones are phonemic.

=== Phonotactics ===
The basic syllable structure in Bare is (C)V(N). (C)VN syllables are reduced to CV in rapid speech.

=== Vowel harmony ===
Bare exhibits translaryngeal vowel harmony.
