= Yabaâna language =

Extinct Arawakan language of Brazil

Yabaâna
- Yabaána, Yabahana
- Native to: Brazil
- Region: Amazonas
- Ethnicity: 90 Yabaâna (1986)
- Extinct: late 20th century
- Language family: Arawakan: Northern; Upper Amazon; Orinoco?; Yabaâna

Language codes
- ISO 639-3: ybn
- Glottolog: yaba1249 Yabaâna-Mainatari
- Linguasphere: 82-AGB-da

Yabaâna (also Yabaána or Yabahana) is an extinct or dormant South American Indigenous language in Brazil, of the Arawakan (Maipurean) language family.
