= Araçá River =

- Location within Brazil
- Native name: Rio Araçá (Portuguese)

Location
- Country: Brazil

Physical characteristics
- Source
  - location: Amazonas
- Mouth
  - coordinates: 0.422633°S 62.907775°W
- Length: 390 km (240 mi)

Basin features
- River system: Demini River

Araçá River (Portuguese: Rio Araçá) is a river of Amazonas state in north-western Brazil. It is a tributary of the Demini River, which in turn is a tributary of the Rio Negro.

== See also ==
- List of rivers of Amazonas
