= Apolista language =

Extinct Arawakan language of Bolivia

Apolista
- Lapachu, Aguachile
- Native to: Bolivia
- Region: Apolobamba
- Ethnicity: Apolista
- Extinct: after 1970s possibly a few very old speakers
- Language family: Arawakan: Southern; Bolivia–Parana?; Apolista

Language codes
- ISO 639-3: None (mis)
- Glottolog: apol1242
- ELP: Lapachu
- Linguasphere: 84-HAA-aa
- Apolista is classified as Extinct by the UNESCO Atlas of the World's Languages in Danger

Apolista, also known as Lapachu or Aguachile, is an extinct Arawakan language of Bolivia. Aikhenvald (1999) classifies it together with Terena, Moxos, and related languages. It is not clear from surviving descriptions whether it was one language or two.
