= Pasé language =

Poorly attested Arawakan language

Pasé
- Passe
- Native to: Colombia, formerly Brazil
- Region: Amazonas
- Ethnicity: Passe
- Language family: Arawakan: Northern; Upper Amazonian; (unclassified); Pasé

Language codes
- ISO 639-3: None (mis)
- Glottolog: pass1250
- Linguasphere: 82-AFF-ba

Pasé (Passe) is a poorly attested and unclassified Arawakan language. It is attested in a single 19th-century wordlist. The Passe people are reported to be in voluntary isolation from the rest of the world.

== Classification ==
Kaufman (1994) placed it in his Río Negro branch, but this is not followed in Aikhenvald (1999). It is grouped with Yumana in the Japurá-Colômbia branch by Ramirez and França (2019).
