= Henri Ramirez =

Brazilian linguist

- Born: Algeria
- Occupation: Linguist

Academic background
- Education: University of Provence
- Thesis: Le Parler Yanomamɨ des Xamatauteri (1994)
- Doctoral advisor: Jean Doneux

Academic work
- Institutions: Federal University of Rondônia, Guajará-Mirim
- Main interests: Arawakan languages and ethnobiology
- Notable works: Enciclopédia das línguas Arawak (2020)

Henri Ramirez is a French-Brazilian linguist known especially for his research on Arawakan languages and other language families of the Amazonian region. He is currently a professor at the Federal University of Rondônia, Guajará-Mirim.

== Education ==
Born in Algeria (then part of France), Ramirez graduated with a master's degree in Engineering from the École Centrale des Arts et Manufactures in 1977. Afterwards, he obtained a Bachelor's, Master's, and doctorate degree at the University of Provence. He has lived among the Yanomami people for years and documented their language in various dissertations and monographs.

== Selected works ==
=== Monographs ===
Ramirez mainly publishes monographs. One of his best-known books is Línguas Arawak da Amazônia Setentrional: Comparação e Descrição (2001). Others include:

- Enciclopédia das línguas Arawak: acrescida de seis novas línguas e dois bancos de dados (2020)
- A Língua dos Hupd'äh do Alto Rio Negro: dicionário e guia de conversação (2006)
- As línguas indígenas do Alto Madeira: estatuto atual e bibliografia básica (2006)
- Dicionário da Língua Baniwa (2001)
- A Fala Tukano dos Ye'pâ-Masa (1997)
- Le Bahuana: une nouvelle langue de la famille arawak (1992)

=== Articles ===
- Koropó, puri, kamakã e outras línguas do Leste Brasileiro (Ramirez, Vegini & França 2015)
- O warázu do Guaporé (tupi-guarani): primeira descrição linguística (Ramirez, Vegini & França 2017)

=== Dissertations ===
- Le Parler Yanomamɨ des Xamatauteri (1994)
- Une nouvelle langue de la famille Arawak (1992)
- Aspects de la morpho-syntaxe du Yanomamɨ (1991)
