= Paresi–Waura languages =

Arawakan language family subgroup

Pareci–Xingu
- Central Maipurean
- Geographic distribution: Brazil, Bolivia
- Linguistic classification: Arawakan: Southern ?; Pareci–Xingu
- Subdivisions: Paresi group; Waura group

Language codes
- Glottolog: cent2226

The Pareci–Xingu languages, also known as Paresi–Waura or Central Maipurean, are Maipurean / Arawakan languages of the Bolivian and western Brazilian Amazon.

== Languages ==
Kaufman (1994) gives the following breakdown:

- Pareci–Xingu
  - Paresí group
    - Paresí also known as Parecís, Haliti
    - Saraveca also known as Sarave †
  - Waurá group
    - Waura–Mehináku also known as Wauja, Meinaku
    - Yawalapiti also known as Jaulapiti
    - Kustenau also known as Kustenaú †

More recent works by Fabre (2005) as well as Brandão and Facundes (2007) include Enawene Nawe in a subgroup with Paresí.
