= Waraikú language =

Arawakan language of Brazil

Waraikú
- Araikú
- Native to: Brazil
- Region: Solimões and Jutaí rivers
- Era: attested c. 1810s
- Language family: Arawakan: Northern; Upper Amazonian; (unclassified); Waraikú

Language codes
- ISO 639-3: None (mis)
- Glottolog: arai1239

Waraikú (Araikú) is an extinct, poorly attested, and unclassified Arawakan language. The only record of this language is in a wordlist published in 1867 by Carl Friedrich Philipp von Martius. Both Kaufman (1994) and Aikhenvald (1999) leave it unclassified within Northern Arawakan.
