= Waurá language =

Arawakan language spoken in Brazil

Waurá
- Wauja
- Pronunciation: [waˈuʐa], [waˈuʂa]
- Native to: Brazil
- Region: Xingu Indigenous Park, Mato Grosso
- Ethnicity: Wauja
- Native speakers: 320 (2006)
- Language family: Arawakan: Southern ?; Paresí–Xingu; Waurá; Waura–Mehináku; Waurá

Language codes
- ISO 639-3: wau
- Glottolog: waur1244
- ELP: Waurá

Waurá (Wauja) is an Arawakan language spoken in the Xingu Indigenous Park of Brazil by the Waujá people. It is "partially intelligible" with Mehináku. The entire population speaks the language.

== Phonology ==
=== Consonants ===
	Labial	Alveolar	Retroflex	Palatal	Velar	Uvular	Glottal
Stop	p	t			k	ɢ	(ʔ)
Affricate		ts		tʃ			
Nasal	m	n					
Fricative		s	ʐ				h
Tap		ɾ					
Approximant	w	l		j			

- A glottal stop [ʔ] occurs phonetically before vowels in word-initial position, or after vowels in word-final position.
- /p/ can be heard as aspirated [pʰ] or voiced [b] in free variation.
- Stop sounds /t, k/ can be heard as aspirated [tʰ, kʰ] in free variation.
- /w/ can also be heard as [β] in free variation, except when before /u/.
- /s/ can be heard as voiced [z] when between vowels, or after initial vowels.
- /ʐ/ can be heard as voiceless [ʂ] when between vowels, or after initial vowels.
- /j/ can be heard as a palatal nasal [ɲ] when occurring before nasal vowels /ã, ẽ, ũ/.

=== Vowels ===
	Front	Central	Back
High	i iː ĩ	ɨ ɨː ɨ̃	u uː ũ
Mid	e eː ẽ		
Low		a aː ã	

- Sounds /i, u, ɨ, a/ can also be heard in lax form as [ɪ, ʊ, ə, ɐ].
- Sounds /e, eː, ẽ/ can be heard as close-mid [e, eː, ẽ] or open-mid [ɛ, ɛː, ɛ̃] in free variation.
