= Marawá language =

Extinct Arawakan language

Marawá
- Maragua
- Native to: Brazil
- Region: Amazonas (Brazilian state)
- Extinct: after 1920
- Language family: Arawakan: Ta-Arawakan; Antillean; Marawá

Language codes
- ISO 639-3: None (mis)
- Glottolog: mara1409
- Linguasphere: 82-AHA-ca

Marawá (Maragua, Marauiá, Marauha) is an extinct Arawakan language of Brazil.

== Vocabulary ==
Marawa	gloss
uquaschumu	1
muschamu	2
gheben	3
