= List of languages by time of extinction =

Language Endangerment Status by UNESCO Atlas of the World's Languages in Danger category

Extinct (EX)
- Extinct (EX): (lists)

Endangered
- Critically Endangered (CR); Severely Endangered (SE); Definitely Endangered (DE); Vulnerable (VU): (list); (list); (list); (list)

Safe
- Safe (NE): no list
- Other categories
- Revived (RE); Constructed (CL): (list); (list)
- Related topics: Atlas of the World's Languages in Danger; Endangered Languages Project; Ethnologue; Unclassified language; List of languages by total number of speakers
- UNESCO Atlas of the World's; Languages in Danger categories

An extinct language may be narrowly defined as a language with no native speakers and no descendant languages. Under this definition, a language becomes extinct upon the death of its last native speaker, the terminal speaker. A language like Latin is not extinct in this sense, because it evolved into the modern Romance languages; it is impossible to state when Latin became extinct because there is a diachronic continuum (compare synchronic continuum) between ancestors Late Latin and Vulgar Latin on the one hand and descendants like Old French and Old Italian on the other; any cutoff date for distinguishing ancestor from descendant is arbitrary. For many languages which have become extinct in recent centuries, attestation of usage is datable in the historical record, and sometimes the terminal speaker is identifiable. In other cases, historians and historical linguists may infer an estimated date of extinction from other events in the history of the sprachraum.

== List ==
=== 21st century ===
Date	Language	Language family	Region	Terminal speaker	Notes
17 September 2026	Chaná	Charruan	Entre Ríos, Argentina and Uruguay	Blas Wilfredo Omar Jaime	Undergoing revitalization since 2013. Jaime's daughter Evangelina also speaks Chaná.
4 August 2026	Guató	Isolate	Mato Grosso do Sul, Brazil	Vicente Manoel da Silva	
7 March 2026	Hupa	Na-Dene	California, United States	Verdena Parker	Undergoing revitalization since the 1970s.
16 October 2025	Lekwungen dialect of North Straits Salish	Salishan	British Columbia, Canada	Čeyɬəm (Elmer George)	
20 September 2025	Aurê-Aurá	Tupian	Maranhão, Brazil	Aurá	
14 July 2025	Caddo	Caddoan	Oklahoma, United States	Edmond Johnson	Under a process of revitalization since 2022.
by 2024	Mawes	Northwest Papuan?	West Papua, Indonesia		
2 May 2023	Columbia-Moses	Salishan	Washington, United States	Pauline Stensgar	
by 2023	Itonama	Isolate	Beni Department, Bolivia		
by 2023	Kuyubí dialect of Moré	Chapacuran	Rondônia, Brazil		
5 October 2022	Mednyj Aleut	Mixed Aleut–Russian	Commander Islands, Russia	Gennady Yakovlev	
19 April 2022	Quapaw	Siouan	Tulsa, Oklahoma, United States	Ardina Moore	
16 February 2022	Yahgan	Isolate	Magallanes, Chile	Cristina Calderón	
by 2022?	Moghol	Mongolic	Herat Province, Afghanistan		Unknown if still spoken.
25 September 2021	Wukchumni dialect of Tule-Kaweah Yokuts	Yokuts	California, United States	Marie Wilcox	
27 August 2021	Yuchi	Isolate	Tennessee (formerly) and Oklahoma in the United States	Maxine Wildcat Barnett	
7 March 2021	Bering Aleut dialect of Aleut	Eskimo-Aleut	Kamchatka Krai, Russia	Vera Timoshenko	
after 2020	Dompo	Niger–Congo	Brong-Ahafo region, Banda District, Ghana		
27 July 2018	Tuscarora	Iroquoian	North Carolina, United States	Howard "Howdy" Hill	Under a process of revival.
4 April 2020	Aka-Cari dialect of Northern Andamanese	Great Andamanese	Andaman Islands, India	Licho	
23 March 2019	Ngandi	Gunwinyguan	Northern Territory, Australia	C. W. Daniels	
4 January 2019	Tehuelche	Chonan	Patagonia, Argentina	Dora Manchado	
November 2018	Sapé	Isolate	Venezuela	Ramón Quimillo Lezama	
2018	Patwin	Wintuan	California, United States	Bertha Wright Mitchell	Being taught in schools and learned by adults. 1 speaker reported in 2021.
2017	Air Matoa		Etna Bay, Indonesia		
by 2017	Hokkaido Ainu	Ainu	Hokkaido, Japan		Semispeakers remain.
9 December 2016	Mandan	Siouan	North Dakota, United States	Edwin Benson	
30 August 2016	Wichita	Caddoan	Oklahoma, United States	Doris McLemore	
29 July 2016	Gugu Thaypan	Pama-Nyungan	Queensland, Australia	Tommy George	
11 February 2016	Nuchatlaht dialect of Nuu-chah-nulth	Wakashan	British Columbia, Canada	Alban Michael	
4 January 2016	Whulshootseed dialect of Lushootseed	Salishan	Washington, United States	Ellen Williams	
by 2016	Marti Ke	Western Daly	Northern Territory, Australia	Patrick Nudjulu or Agatha Perdjert	
4 February 2014	Klallam	Salishan	Washington, United States	Hazel Sampson (Note: Last surviving native speaker.)	being taught as a second language on the Olympic Peninsula of Washington State
January 2014	Torona	Atlantic–Congo	South Kordofan, South Sudan	Karaɽul Alunga Almendi	
by 2014	Worrorra	Worrorra	Western Australia		Only partial or passive speakers remain as of 2014.
5 June 2013	Livonian	Uralic	Latvia	Grizelda Kristiņa (Note: Last surviving native speaker; some children still learn it as a second language.)	Under a process of revival. 1 native speaker as of 2020.
26 March 2013	Yurok	Algic	California, United States	Archie Thompson	Under a process of revival.
by 2013	Demushbo	Panoan	Amazon Basin, Brazil		1 speaker in 2010.
2 October 2012	Cromarty dialect of Scots	Indo-European	Northern Scotland, United Kingdom	Bobby Hogg	
11 July 2012	Upper Chinook	Chinookan	Oregon, United States	Gladys Thompson	
10 March 2012	Holikachuk	Na-Dene	Alaska, United States	Wilson "Tiny" Deacon	
2012	Andoa	Zaparoan	Peru	Hipólito Arahuanaza	
2012	Mardijker	Portuguese-based creole	Jakarta, Indonesia	Mimi Abrahams	
c. 2012	Dhungaloo dialect of Taribelang	Pama-Nyungan	Queensland, Australia	Roy Hatfield	
10 April 2011	Apiaká	Tupian	Mato Grosso, Brazil	Pedrinho Kamassuri	
2011	Lower Arrernte	Pama-Nyungan	Northern Territory, Australia	Brownie Doolan Perrurle	
24 October 2010	Pazeh dialect of Pazeh–Kaxabu	Austronesian	Taiwan	Pan Jin-yu	
20 August 2010	Cochin Indo-Portuguese Creole	Portuguese-based creole	Southern India	William Rozario	
26 January 2010	Aka-Bo	Andamanese	Andaman Islands, India	Boa Sr.	
by 2010	Piru dialect of Luhu	Austronesian	Maluku, Indonesia		
November 2009	Aka-Kora	Andamanese	Andaman Islands, India	Ms. Boro	
22 February 2009	Great Andamanese koiné	Andamanese	Andaman Islands, India	Nao Jr.	
2009	Olrat	Austronesian	Banks Islands, Vanuatu	Maten Womal	
by 2009	Papora-Hoanya	Austronesian	Taiwan		
30 July 2008	Tübatulabal	Uto-Aztecan	California, United States	James Andreas	
24 February 2008	Plains Apache	Na-Dene	Oklahoma, United States	Alfred Chalepah Jr.	
21 January 2008	Eyak	Na-Dene	Alaska, United States	Marie Smith Jones	
2008	Oroch	Tungusic	Khabarovsk Krai, Russia		
10 August 2007	Gros Ventre	Algic	Montana, United States	Theresa Lamebull	
2007	Northeastern Maidu	Maiduan	Central California, United States		Under process of revival
by 2007	Rusenu	Trans–New Guinea?	eastern East Timor		
by 2007	Hpun	Sino-Tibetan	Myanmar		
11 July 2006	Wasco dialect of Upper Chinook	Chinookan	Oregon, United States	Madeline Brunoe McInturff	
2006	Omurano	Isolate	Peru	Esteban Macusi	
2006	Aghu Tharnggala	Pama-Nyungan	Queensland, Australia		
2006	Ludza dialect of South Estonian	Uralic	Latvia	Nikolājs Nikonovs	
by 2006	Zumaya	Afroasiatic	Cameroon		Most speakers have shifted to Fula.
after 2005	Warluwarra	Pama-Nyungan	Australia		No speakers reported in 2021 census
3 November 2005	Osage	Siouan	Oklahoma, United States	Lucille Roubedeaux	being revived
2005	Berbice Creole Dutch	Dutch-based creole	Guyana	Bertha Bell	
2005	Kerek	Chukotko-Kamchatkan	Chukotka	Ekaterina Khatkana	
2005	Northern Pomo	Pomoan	California, United States		
by 2005	Barrow Point	Pama-Nyungan	Queensland, Australia	Urwunjin Roger Hart	
20 September 2004	Nüshu script	unclassified	Hunan, China	Yang Huanyi	
2004	Umotína	Bororoan	Mato Grosso, Brazil	Julá Paré	
2004	Uru	Uru–Chipaya	Iru-Itu, Bolivia	Julia Vila	
c. 2004?	Duli–Gewe	Niger-Congo	Cameroon		
29 December 2003	Akkala Sami	Uralic	Kola Peninsula, Russia	Marja Sergina	4 rememberers persisted as of 2018.
22 November 2003	Wintu	Wintuan	California, United States	Flora Jones	
14 September 2003	Klamath-Modoc	Plateau Penutian	Oregon, United States	Neva Eggsman	
September 2003	Garig-Ilgar	Iwaidjan	Northern Territory, Australia	Charlie Wardaga	
September 2003	Marrgu	Marrku–Wurrugu	Northern Territory, Australia	Charlie Wardaga	
September 2003	Manangkari	Iwaidjan	Northern Territory, Australia	Charlie Wardaga	
2003	Nonuya	Witotoan	Colombia	Humberto Ayace	
by 2003	Areba	Pama-Nyungan	Queensland, Australia		
by 2003	Atampaya	Pama-Nyungan	Queensland, Australia		
by 2003	Makolkol	unclassified	New Britain, Papua New Guinea		possible Papuan language
4 November 2002	Serrano	Uto-Aztecan	California, United States	Dorothy Ramon	being revived
31 August 2002	Unami	Algic	Delaware, United States	Edward Thompson (Note: Brother of Lenape traditionalist and language preservation activist Nora Thompson Dean)	
23 May 2002	Gaagudju	Isolate	Northern Territory, Australia	Big Bill Neidjie	
2002	Tandia	Austronesian	West Papua, Indonesia		Speakers shifted to Wandamen.
2002	Akurio	Cariban	Suriname		
by 2001	Amanayé	Tupian	Brazil		
by 2001	Umbugarla	Arnhem Land languages or Darwin Region languages	Northern Territory, Australia	Butcher Knight	
by 2001	Ngurmbur	Arnhem Land languages or Darwin Region languages	Northern Territory, Australia	Butcher Knight	
by 2001	Bahuana	Arawakan	Brazil	Claudina de Souza Soares	Language had recently gone extinct by 2001
2000	Máku	Isolate	Roraima, Brazil	Sinfrônio Magalhães (Kuluta)	
2000	Sowa	Austronesian	Pentecost, Vanuatu	Maurice Tabi	
c. 2000	Pémono	Cariban	Venezuela	Juanita Garcia	
c. 2000	Mapia	Austronesian	Mapia Atoll, Indonesia		
c. 2000	Mesmes	Afroasiatic	Ethiopia	Abegaz	
c. 2000	Kamarian	Austronesian	west Seram Island, Indonesia		
c. 2000	Apolista	Arawakan	Apolobamba		It is possible there are still a few very old speakers. There may be two distinct languages under this label.
c. 2000	Rennellese Sign Language	unclassified	Solomon Islands	Kagobai	
c. 2000	Wanham	Chapacuran	Brazil	Firmino Miguelem	
by 2000	Central Pomo	Pomoan	Northern California		
2000s	Torá	Chapacuran	Brazil		few semispeakers remain

=== 20th century ===
Date	Language or dialect	Language family	Region	Terminal speaker	Notes
20th–21st century (?)	Ayabadhu	Pama-Nyungan	Queensland, Australia		
20th–21st century (?)	Adithinngithigh	Pama-Nyungan	Queensland, Australia		
20th–21st century (?)	Arritinngithigh	Pama-Nyungan	Queensland, Australia		
1980–2000	Tepecano	Uto-Aztecan	Central Mexico	Lino de la Rosa	Last known speaker was alive in 1980
1999	Nyulnyul	Pama-Nyungan	Australia	Carmel Charles	
1998	Mlahsô	Afroasiatic	Syria; Turkey	Ibrahim Hanna	
by 1998	Skepi Creole Dutch	Dutch-based creole	Guyana		
1997–98	Ngarnka	Pama-Nyungan	Australia		
after 1997	Aribwatsa	Austronesian	Morobe Province, Papua New Guinea	Butoawê	Most descendants have switched to the Bukawa language.
January 1997	Sireniki Yupik	Eskimo–Aleut	Chukotka Peninsula, Russia	Valentina Wye	
1997	Guazacapán Xinca	Xincan	Santa Rosa, Guatemala		1 semispeaker
1997	Jumaytepeque Xinca	Xincan	By Volcán Jumaytepeque, Guatemala		
after 1996	Hibito	Hibito–Cholon	Bobonaje River Valley	Natividad Grández del Castillo	
c. 1996 (?)	Malaryan	Dravidian	Kerala and Tamil Nadu, India		
16 December 1996	Chiwere	Siouan	Oklahoma and Kansas, United States	Truman Washington Dailey	
by 1996	Chiquimulilla Xinca	Xincan	Chiquimulilla, Guatemala		The last semi-speaker Julian de la Cruz died in 1996.
by 1996	Katabaga	Austronesian	Philippines		
by 1996	Palumata	Austronesian?	Maluku, Indonesia		
by 1996	Seru	Austronesian	Sarawak, Malaysia		
after 1995	Bikya	Niger-Congo	Cameroon	Dana Agayando	
after 1995	Bishuo	Niger-Congo	Cameroon	Irissa Ntjieka	
5 November 1995	Kasabe	Niger–Congo	Cameroon	Bogon	
6 August 1995	Martuthunira	Pama-Nyungan	Western Australia	Algy Paterson	
by 1995	Mandawaca	Arawakan	Venezuela, Brazil		
late 1990s	Muniche	Isolate	Loreto Region, Peru	Victoria Huancho Icahuate	
after 1994	Lachoudisch	Indo-European	Schopfloch, Bavaria		
16 May 1994	Luiseño	Uto-Aztecan	Southern California	Villiana Calac Hyde	A revitalization process is happening.
30 April 1994	Sakhalin Ainu	Ainu languages	Japan	Take Asai	
by 1994	Burduna	Pama-Nyungan	Western Australia		
by 1994	Ngunnawal	Pama-Nyungan	New South Wales, Australia		being revived
13 July 1993	Eastern Abnaki	Algic	Maine, United States	Madeline Shay	
2 February 1993	Baré	Arawakan	Venezuela, Brazil	Candelário da Silva	
1993	Cholón	Hibito–Cholon	Huallaga River valley, Peru	Victoria Cerquera Ojeda	A few semispeakers remain.
7 October 1992	Ubykh	Northwest Caucasian	Balıkesir Province, Turkey	Tevfik Esenç	
23 February 1991	Roncalese (Erronkariko) dialect of Basque	Isolate	Spain	Fidela Bernat	
1991	Ullatan	Dravidian	India		
30 July 1990	Wappo	Yuki–Wappo	California, United States	Laura Fish Somersal	
early 1990s	Hermit	Austronesian	Manus Province, Papua New Guinea		It has been mostly replaced by Seimat.
c. 1990s	Lumaete dialect of Kayeli	Austronesian	central Maluku, Indonesia		
1990s	Taman	Sino-Tibetan	Myanmar		
c. 1990s	Unggumi	Worrorra	Australia	Morndi Munro	
1990s?	Berti	Saharan	Dafur and Kordofan, Sudan		
after 1989	Hukumina	Austronesian	Maluku, Indonesia		
20 September 1989	Kamas	Uralic	Sayan Mountains, Soviet Union	Klavdiya Plotnikova	
March 1989	Leliali dialect of Kayeli	Austronesian	central Maluku, Indonesia		
1989	Kungarakany	Gunwinyguan	Northern Territory, Australia	Madeline England	
16 September 1988	Atsugewi	Palaihnihan	California, United States	Medie Webster	
1988	ǁXegwi	Tuu	South Africa	Jopi Mabinda	
1980s	Bidyara	Pama-Nyungan	Queensland, Australia		
after 1987	Hoti	Austronesian	Seram, Indonesia		
c. 1987	Laua	Trans-New Guinea	Papua New Guinea		
4 February 1987	Cupeño	Uto-Aztecan	California, United States	Roscinda Nolásquez	
1987	Dyangadi	Pama-Nyungan	New South Wales, Australia		137 speakers in 2021 census.
1987	Negerhollands	Dutch-based creole	U.S. Virgin Islands	Alice Stevens	
by 1987	Basa-Gumna	Niger-Congo	Niger State/Plateau State, Nigeria		
by 1987	Yugambal	Pama-Nyungan	Queensland, Australia		
April 1986	Jiwarli dialect of Mantharta	Pama-Nyungan	Australia	Jack Butler	
1986	Mangala	Pama-Nyungan	Western Australia		
1986	Volow	Austronesian	Vanuatu	Wanhan	
late 1980s to early 1990s	Cahuarano	Zaparoan	Along the Nanay River in Peru.		
18 March 1984	Deeside dialect of Scottish Gaelic	Indo-European	Scotland	Jean Bain	
1984	Yavitero	Arawakan	Venezuela		
February 1983	Antrim Irish	Indo-European	Ireland	Séamus Bhriain Mac Amhlaig	
c. 1983	Yangman dialect of Wardaman	Isolate	Northern Territory, Australia		
by 1983	Nagumi	Niger-Congo	Cameroon		
after 1982	Tutelo	Siouan	Virginia, United States	Albert Green	
June 1982	Kansa	Siouan	Oklahoma, United States	Ralph Pepper	
1982	Bala	Tungusic	Zhangguangcai Range		
1982	Dagoman	Australian	Northern Territory, Australia	Martha Hart	
by 1982	Dyugun	Australian	Western Australia		
by 1982	Kato	Na-Dene	California, United States		
after 1981	Dirari	Pama-Nyungan	South Australia		
after 1981	Dyaberdyaber	Pama-Nyungan	Western Australia		
after 1981	Erre	Australian	Northern Territory, Australia		
after 1981	Yawarawarga	Pama-Nyungan	Queensland and South Australia		
after 1981	Ampanang	Austronesian	Kalimantan, Indonesia		Ampanang was already moribund in 1905.
after 1981	Selkʼnam	Chon	Tierra del Fuego, Argentina		
c. 1981	Ternateño	Portuguese Creole	Maluku, Indonesia		
1 May 1981	Pitta Pitta	Pama-Nyungan	Queensland, Australia		with the deaths of Ivy Nardoo of Boulia
1981	Nagarchal	Dravidian?	India		unattested
1981	Warrungu	Pama-Nyungan	Queensland, Australia	Alf Palmer	
by 1981	Bina	Austronesian	Central Province (Papua New Guinea)		
1980	Twana	Salishan	Washington, United States		
1980	Yalarnnga	Pama-Nyungan	Australia		
after 1979	Kalkatungu	Pama–Nyungan	Queensland, Australia	Lardie Moonlight	
early 1980s	Muruwari	Pama-Nyungan	Queensland and New South Wales, Australia		
1980s	Alchuka	Tungusic	Heilongjiang		
1980s	Kyakala (China)	Tungusic	Northeastern China		
1980s	Alngith	Pama-Nyungan	Queensland, Australia		
1980s	Tequiraca	Isolate	Loreto, Peru		2 people remembered the language in 2008.
late 1970s - 1980s	Flinders Island	Pama-Nyungan	Australia	Johnny Flinders	
1971 – 1981	Kwadi	Khoe	southwestern Angola		
1970s – 1980s	Chicomuceltec	Mayan	Mexico; Guatemala		
22 February 1979	Barranbinja	Pama-Nyungan	New South Wales, Australia	Emily Margaret Horneville	
1978	Shasta	Shastan	California, United States	Clara Wicks	
3 November 1977	Shuadit	Indo-European	southern France	Armand Lunel	
24 August 1977	Ngawun	Pama-Nyungan	Queensland, Australia	Cherry O'Keefe	
13 July 1977	Nooksack	Salishan	Washington, United States	Sindick Jimmy	
1977	Arran Gaelic	Indo-European	Isle of Arran	Donald Craig	
by 1977	Babuza	Austronesian	Taiwan		
by 1977	Luilang	Austronesian	Banqiao District		
1976–1999	Kw'adza	Afroasiatic	Tanzania		
after 1976	Sabüm	Mon–Khmer	Perak, Malaysia		
after 1976	Muskum	Afroasiatic	western Chad		
by 1975	Homa	Niger-Congo	southern Sudan		
after 1974?	Jorá	Tupi	Bolivia		Speakers may still remain.
27 December 1974	Manx	Indo-European	Isle of Man, British islands	Ned Maddrell	Now being revived as a second language
1974	Moksela	Austronesian	Maluku, Indonesia		
by 1974	Cacaopera	Misumalpan	El Salvador		
by 1974	Dicamay Agta	Austronesian	Luzon, Philippines		The Dicamay Agta were killed by Ilokano homesteaders sometime between 1957 and 1974.
after 1973	Môa Remo	Panoan	Along the Môa River of Amazonas, Peru		A word list was recorded in 1973.
9 October 1972	Tillamook	Salishan	Oregon, United States	Minnie Scovell	
5 February 1972	Hanis	Coosan	Oregon, United States	Martha Harney Johnson	
1972	Mbabaram	Pama-Nyungan	Queensland, Australia	Albert Bennett	
1972	Wyandot	Iroquoian	Oklahoma, United States; Quebec, Canada		
by 1972	Yugh	Yeniseian	central Siberia, Soviet Union		
c. 1970s	Cocoliche	Italian-based pidgin	Buenos Aires, Argentina		Some content survived in the lunfardo slang of Rioplatense Spanish dialect
1970s	Teushen	Chonan	Chubut Province, Argentina		
1970s	Damin	Constructed	Mornington Island		
1970s	Lelak	Austronesian	Sarawak, Malaysia		
late 20th century (?)	Nganyaywana	Pama-Nyungan	Australia		
late 20th century (?)	Ngamini	Pama-Nyungan	South Australia		
late 20th century (?)	Nila	Austronesian	Nila Island, Indonesia		Speakers were relocated to Seram due to volcanic activity on Nila
late 20th century (?)	Serua	Austronesian	Mount Serua, Indonesia		Speakers were relocated to Seram due to volcanic activity on Serua
late 20th century	Yabaâna	Arawakan	Brazil		
late 20th century	Madhi Madhi	Pama–Nyungan	New South Wales, Australia	Jack Long	
late 20th century	Newfoundland Irish	Indo-European	Newfoundland, Canada		
late 20th century	Soyot	Turkic	Buryatia, Khövsgöl Province		Partly revitalized
late 20th century	Saraveca	Arawakan	Eastern lowlands Bolivia		
1969	Kuungkari	Pama–Nyungan	Queensland, Australia	Arthur Winkler (Winkili)	
1969	Pirriya	Pama–Nyungan	Queensland, Australia	Albert Upperty (Uppity)	
1968	Welsh-Romani	Romani	Wales, United Kingdom	Manfri Wood	
by 1968	Sened	Afroasiatic	Tunisia		
after 1965	Barngarla	Pama-Nyungan	southern Australia	Moonie Davis	
after 1965	Napeca	Chapacuran	Bolivia		Semispeakers remain.
24 July 1965	Barbareño	Chumashan	California, United States	Mary Yee (Note: Last attested speaker of a Chumashan language)	
1965	Ineseño	Chumashan	California, United States		
1965	Wakawaka	Pama-Nyungan	Queensland, Australia		
1965	Sapará	Cariban	Roraima, Brazil		
after 1964	Charrúa	Charruan	Entre Ríos Province and Uruguay		
after 1964	Paratio	Xukuruan	Pesqueira, Pernambuco, Brazil		It was spoken by a few people in Pesqueira in 1964.
after 1964	Tocantins Apiaká	Cariban	Pará, Brazil		Loukotka (1968)
after 1964	Kustenau	Arawakan	Mato Grosso, Brazil		Loukotka (1968)
after 1964	Kunza	unclassified (isolate?)	Atacama Desert, Chile/Peru		Loukotka (1968)
c. 1964	Aariya?	spurious?	India		
10 August 1963	Galice	Na-Dene	Oregon, United States	Hoxie Simmons	
10 January 1963	Upper Umpqua	Na-Dene	Oregon, United States	Wolverton Orton	
1962	Wiyot	Algic	California, United States	Delia Prince	
1961	Northeastern Pomo	Pomoan	California, United States		
by 1961	Xocó	unclassified	Sergipe, Alagoas, Brazil		Only a few people remembered the language in 1961.
by 1961	Pankararú	unclassified	Pernambuco, Alagoas, Brazil		Only two people remembered the language in 1961.
1960	Oriel dialect of Irish	Indo-European	Ireland	Annie O'Hanlon	
1960	Siuslaw	Isolate	Oregon, United States	Mary Barrett Elliott	
1960	Gününa Küne	Chon	Argentina	José María Cual	
1960s	Cuitlatec	Isolate	Guerrero, Mexico	Juana Can	
1960s	Luren	Sino-Tibetan	Guizhou		
1960s	Miami-Illinois	Algic	along the Mississippi River, United States		Revived; at least 500 users in 2016
1960s	Timor Pidgin	Portuguese creole	East Timor		
16 April 1959	Catawba	Siouan	South Carolina, United States	Chief Sam Blue	
22 September 1958	Molala	Isolate	Oregon, United States	Fred Yelkes	
1958	Salinan	Isolate	California, United States		
after 1957	Jandiatuba Mayoruna	Panoan	Amazon basin, Brazil		
25 March 1957	Natchez	Isolate	Mississippi, United States	Nancy Raven	The Natchez people are attempting to revive this language.
1957	Lower Umpqua dialect of Siuslaw	Isolate	Oregon, United States	Billy Dick	
c. 1957	Kiriri of Mirandela	unclassified	Bahia, Brazil		
1952–1956	Aasáx	Afroasiatic	Tanzania		
by 1954	Palmela	Cariban	South America		
after 1954	Tây Bồi	French-based Pidgin	Vietnam		
1954	Central Kalapuya	Kalapuyan	Oregon, United States	John B. Hudson	
1954	Ifo	Austronesian	Erromanga Island, Vanuatu	James Nalig	
1952	Martha's Vineyard Sign Language	Sign language	Massachusetts, United States	Katie West	
1951	Alsea dialect of Alsea	Isolate (Alsean)	Oregon, United States	John Albert	
c. 1950	Bohemian Romani	mixed language	Czechoslovakia, Central Europe		after World War II, due to extermination of most of its speakers in Nazi concentration camps.
1950	Kaniet	Austronesian	Manus Province, Papua New Guinea		
c. 1950s	Makuva	Trans–New Guinea?	East Timor		
c. 1950s	Kilit	Indo-European	Nakhchivan		
c. 1950s	Pijao	unclassified (Cariban?)	Tolima Department, Colombia		
1950s	Kepkiriwát	Tupian	Rondônia, Brazil		
1950s	Chimariko	Isolate	California, United States	Martha Ziegler	
mid-20th century	Ventureño	Chumashan	California, United States		
mid-20th century	Basay	Austronesian	Taiwan		
mid-20th century	Slovincian	Indo-European	Pomerania, Poland		
mid-20th century	Southern Pame	Oto-Manguean	Southern Mexico		
mid-20th century	Sensi	Panoan	right bank of Ucayali River, Peru		A word list was created by Günter Tessmann in the 1920s.
around mid-20th century	Tubar	Uto-Aztecan	Northern Mexico		
around mid-20th century?	Chico	Maiduan	Central California		
6 December 1948	Tunica	Isolate	Louisiana, United States	Sesostrie Youchigant	
after 1947	Gafat	Afroasiatic	along the Abbay River, Ethiopia		
by 1947	Miriti-Tapuya	Tucanoan	Amazonas, Brazil		Speakers switched to Tucano.
after 1944?	Pauxiana	Cariban	Roraima, Brazil		Possibly extinct.
after 1944	Opón-Carare	Cariban	Colombia		
1943	Payagua	Isolate (Mataco–Guaicuru?)	Alto Paraguay, Paraguay	María Dominga Miranda	
3 March 1940	Pentlatch	Salishan	Vancouver Island, Canada	Joe Nimnim	Being revived
28 January 1940	Chitimacha	Isolate	Louisiana, United States	Delphine Ducloux	
c. 1940	Eudeve	Uto-Aztecan	Sonora, Mexico		
c. 1940s	Chemakum	Chimakuan	Washington, United States		
c. 1940s	Ossory dialect of Irish	Indo-European	County Kilkenny, Ireland		
c. 1940s	Kitanemuk	Uto-Aztecan	California, United States	Marcelino Rivera, Isabella Gonzales, or Refugia Duran	
c. 1940s	Northern Manx dialect of Manx	Indo-European	Isle of Man		
1940s	Tongva	Uto-Aztecan	Southern California, United States		being revived
22 May 1939	Rumsen	Utian	California, United States	Isabel Meadows	
9 May 1939	Miluk	Coosan	Oregon, United States	Annie Miner Peterson	
after 1937	Guarú dialect of Yucuna	Arawakan	Amazonas Department, Colombia	Amanumá	
16 January 1937	Northern Kalapuya	Kalapuyan	Oregon, United States	Louis Kenoyer	
1937	Yoncalla	Kalapuyan	Oregon, United States	Laura Blackery Albertson	
after 1936	Yarumá	Cariban	South America		
1936	Narungga	Pama-Nyungan	South Australia, Australia		
8 January 1935	Biloxi	Siouan	Louisiana, United States	Emma Jackson	
1934	Juaneño	Uto-Aztecan	California, United States		
1934	Chochenyo	Utian	California, United States	José Guzmán	
1934	Takelma	Isolate	Oregon, United States	Frances Johnson	
by 1934	Xukuru	Xukuruan	Pernambuco and Paraíba, Brazil		Only rememberers remained by 1934.
1933	Gabrielino	Uto-Aztecan	California, United States		
1931–1951	Akarbale	Andamanese	Andaman Islands, India		
1931–1951	Akakede	Andamanese	Andaman Islands, India		
1931–1951	Opucikwar	Andamanese	Andaman Islands, India		
after 1932	Kankuamo	Chibchan	Cesar Department, Colombia		
after 1931	Tonkawa	Isolate	Oklahoma/Texas/New Mexico, United States		
after 1931	Jaquirana Remo	Panoan	Amazonas, Brazil		A word list was made in 1931.
after 1931	Tutxiunaua	Panoan	Acre, Brazil		A word list was made in 1931.
by 1931	Aka-Bea	Andamanese	Andaman Islands, India		
by 1931	Okojuwoi	Andamanese	Andaman Islands, India		
after 1930	Morique	Arawakan	Between the Ucayali River and Javari River		
c. 1930	Mattole	Na-Dene	California, United States		
29 January 1930	Mutsun	Utian	California, United States	Ascencion Solorsano	
1930s	Pirlatapa	Pama-Nyungan	South Australia	Blanche Tom	The last rememberer, Fred Johnson, died in 1967.
c. 1930s	Cayuse	unclassified	Oregon, United States		
c. 1930s	Kathlamet	Chinookan	Washington/Oregon, United States	Charles Cultee	
c. 1930s	Lower Chinook	Chinookan	Washington/Oregon, United States		
c. 1930s	Mahican	Algic	New York, United States		
c. 1930s	Clackamas dialect of Upper Chinook	Chinookan	Washington/Oregon, United States		
c. 1930s	Kitsai	Caddoan	Oklahoma, United States	Kai Kai	
c. 1930s	Tapachultec	Mixe–Zoque	Southern Mexico		
by 1930	Opata	Uto-Aztecan	Northern Mexico		
between 1920 and 1940	Ajawa	Afroasiatic	Bauchi State, Nigeria		
25 December 1929	Kaurna	Pama-Nyungan	South Australia	Ivaritji	now being revived
c. 1929	Bear River dialect of Mattole	Na-Dene	California, US		
1928	Ottoman Turkish	Turkic	Turkey		Evolved into Turkish in 1928.
after 1927	Teshenawa	Afroasiatic	Jigawa State, Nigeria		
after 1927	Tarauacá Kashinawa	Panoan	Amazonas, Brazil		A word list was made in 1927.
after 1927	Blanco River Remo	Panoan	Loreto Province, Peru		A word list was made in 1927.
after 1927	Urupá	Chapacuran	Brazil		A word list was made in 1927.
after 1927	Yarú	Chapacuran	Brazil		A word list was made in 1927.
after 1927	Karipuna (Jau-Navo)	Panoan	Brazil		A word list was made in 1927.
1927	Tsetsaut	Na-Dene	British Columbia, Canada		
by 1926	Bunurong	Pama-Nyungan	Victoria, Australia		
after 1925	Subtiaba	Oto-Manguean (Subtiaba-Tlapanec)	Nicaragua		
1925	Papuan Pidgin English	English-based pidgin	British New Guinea		
1925	Vanji	Indo-European	Emirate of Bukhara		
after 1924	Auyokawa	Afro-Asiatic	Jigawa State		
after 1921	Chagatai	Turkic	Central Asia including Turkmenistan		Studied in Uzbekistan and Turkey.
30 June 1921	Tataviam	Uto-Aztecan	California, United States	Juan José Fustero	
by 1921	Okol	Andamanese	Andaman Islands, India		
after 1920s	Sarghulami	Indo-European	Badakhshan		May be spurious
after 1920	Sinacantán Xinca	Xincan	Santa Rosa, Guatemala		A word list was recorded by Walter Lehmann in 1920.
c. 1920	Mochica	Isolate	northwest Peru		fully in 1995 with the death of Simón Quesquén
c. 1920s	Fergana Kipchak	Turkic	Fergana Valley		
c. 1920s	Otuke	Bororoan	Mato Grosso, Santa Cruz		
1920s	Pataxó Hã-Ha-Hãe	Macro-Jê	Brazil		fully in 1992 with the death of Bahetá. Being revived
by 1920	Yupiltepeque Xinca	Xincan	Guatemala		
c. 1918	Island Carib	Cariban	Lesser Antilles, Caribbean Sea	Ma Gustave	An offshoot survives as Garifuna.
after 1917	Pochutec	Uto-Aztecan	Oaxaca, Mexico		
15 June 1917	Obispeño	Chumashan	Southern California, United States	Rosario Cooper	
by 1917	Chorotega	Oto-Manguean	Costa Rica; Nicaragua		
after 1916	Wayumará	Cariban	Roraima, Brazil		
25 March 1916	Yahi dialect of Yana	Isolate	California, United States	Ishi (Note: Last member of the Yahi, the last surviving group of the Yana people who spoke Yana)	
after 1915	Chiapanec	Oto-Manguean	Chiapas, Mexico		There were only 3 speakers in 1915.
1915	Yamhill dialect of Northern Kalapuya	Kalapuyan	Oregon, United States		
1914	Paravilhana	Cariban	Roraima, Brazil		
after 1910	Anauyá	Arawakan	Castaño Viejo River Amazonas, Venezuela		Only documentation was published in 1928.
1910s	ǀXam	Tuu	South Africa		
c. 1910s	Kwalhioqua-Clatskanie	Na-Dene	Washington, United States		
after 1908	Gueren	Macro-Jê	Minas Gerais, Brazil		
after 1908	Conambo	Zaparoan	Northeastern Peru, near the Conambo River.		Some consider Conambo to be a dialect of Záparo.
after 1908	Chané dialect of Terêna	Arawakan	Argentina		
after 1908	Siraya	Austronesian	southwestern Taiwan		being revived
18 July 1908	Mohegan-Pequot	Algic	southern New England, United States	Fidelia Fielding	being revived
after 1907	Weyto	unclassified	Ethiopia	Switched to Amharic by 1907.	
after 1906	Arazaire	Panoan	Cusco Province, Peru		A word list was recorded in 1906.
24 February 1905	Flinders Island lingua franca (Tasmanian)	unclassified (Tasmanian)	Tasmania, Australia	Fanny Cochrane Smith (Note: Considered to be the last fluent speaker of a Tasmanian language.)	
after 1904	Atsawaka	Panoan	Puno Province, Peru		There were 20 speakers in 1904.
after 1902	Dyirringany	Pama–Nyungan	New South Wales, Australia		
between 1900 and 1920	Russian Kyakala dialect of Udege language	Tungusic	Russia		
between 1900 and 1920	Jangil	Ongan	Andaman Islands, India		
c. 1900	Henniker Sign Language	Village sign	New Hampshire, United States		
c. 1900	Moran	Sino-Tibetan	Assam, India		
May 1900	Moriori	Austronesian	Chatham Island, New Zealand	Hirawanu Tapu	
1900	Wulguru	Pama-Nyungan	Australia		
by 1900	Classical Mandaic	Afroasiatic	Iran; Iraq		
by 1900	Piro Pueblo	Tanoan	New Mexico, United States		
1900s	Iazychie	Indo-European	Halychyna, Bukovina, Zakarpattia		
1900s	Judeo-Venetian	Indo-European	Venice		
1900s	Rotvælsk	Indo-European	Denmark		
early 20th century	Atakapa	Isolate	Louisiana/Texas, United States		
early 20th century	Nari-Nari	Pama–Nyungan	New South Wales, Australia	Angus Myers	
early 20th century	Kamakã	Macro-Jê	Bahia, Brazil		A few words of Kamakã have been preserved to the modern day.
early 20th century	Jersey Dutch	Dutch-based creole	New Jersey, United States		
early 20th century	Kazukuru	Austronesian	New Georgia, Solomon Islands		
early 20th century	Kyakhta Russian–Chinese Pidgin	Chinese/Russian-based contact language			
early 20th century	Marawán	Arawakan	Brazil		
early 20th century	East Leinster dialect, Irish	Indo-European	Ireland		
early 20th century	Ingain	Macro-Jê	Santa Catarina, Brazil		
beginning of 20th century	Rangas	Sino-Tibetan	Uttarakhand		

=== 19th century ===
Date	Language	Language family	Region	Notes
after 19th century	Wiriná	Arawakan	Brazil	
19th–20th century	Yuri	Ticuna-Yuri	Along the Caquetá River.	May have developed into Carabayo.
19th–20th century	Eora/Dharug	Pama-Nyungan	Queensland and New South Wales, Australia	Being revived
later 19th century (?)	Mbara	Pama-Nyungan	Australia	
late 19th century	Adai	Isolate	Louisiana, United States	
late 19th century	Purí	Isolate (Purian)	southeastern Brazil	
late 19th century	Coroado Purí dialect of Puri	Isolate (Purian)	southeastern Brazil	
late 19th century	Istrian Albanian	Albanian	Croatia	
late 19th century	Chuvan	Yukaghir	Anadyr basin of Chukotka in Russia	
late 19th century	Quiripi	Algic	Connecticut/New York/New Jersey, United States	
after 1899	Nawathinehena	Algic	Oklahoma and Wyoming, United States	
by 1899	Ahom	Tai	India	
by 1899	Waling	Sino-Tibetan	Nepal	
10 June 1898	Dalmatian	Indo-European	Croatia; Montenegro	with the death of Tuone Udaina.
after 1892	Awabakal	Pama-Nyungan	Queensland, Australia	
after 1890	Aruã	Arawakan	Marajó	
after 1886	Solteco Zapotec	Oto-Manguean	Oaxaca, Mexico	
after 1886	Cotoname	Isolate	Mexico; Texas, United States	
after 1886	Yanda	Pama-Nyungan	Queensland, Australia	Only documentation was made in 1886.
after 1884	Manitsauá	Tupian	Mato Grosso, Brazil	Word list was made in 1884 during the Xingú river expedition.
after 1884	Yaquina dialect of Alsea	Isolate (Alsean)	Oregon, United States	
by 1884	Chapacura	Chapacuran	Bolivia	
1882	Dorasque	Chibchan	Panama and Costa Rica	
after 1880	Kenaboi	unclassified (isolate?)	Negeri Sembilan, Malaysia	
c. 1880	Matagalpa	Misumalpan	Nicaragua	
c. 1880	Auregnais	Indo-European	Alderney, United Kingdom	
1877	Aruá	Arauan	Brazil	
8 May 1876	Bruny Island	Eastern Tasmanian (Tasmanian)	Tasmania, Australia	with the death of Truganini (Note: Considered to be the last full-blood speaker of a Tasmanian language; however, Fanny Cochrane Smith, who spoke one of the Tasmanian languages, outlived her.)
1870s	Boanarí	Cariban	Amazonas, Brazil	Only documentation was published in 1875.
mid-1870s	Yola	Indo-European	Wexford, Ireland	
1870s–1890s	Yokohamese	Japanese based pidgin	Yokohama	
after 1862	Malalí	Macro-Jê	Minas Gerais, Brazil	There were 30 Malalí people in 1862.
after 1859	Chakpa	Sino-Tibetan	Manipur	
after 1858	Karankawa	unclassified	Texas, United States	concurrent with the extermination of the tribe at the hands of Juan Cortina
c. 1857	Woiwurrung–Taungurung	Pama-Nyungan	Victoria, Australia	
26 December 1856	Nanticoke	Algic	Delaware and Maryland, United States	with the death of Lydia Clark
12 January 1855	Wampanoag	Algic	Massachusetts, United States	Nantucket Wampanoag disappeared with the death of Dorcas Honorable
after 1853	Samaritan	Afroasiatic	West Bank, Palestine/Israel	Still used as a liturgical language
19 October 1853	Nicoleño	Uto-Aztecan	California, United States	with the death of Juana Maria
after 1851	Wainumá-Mariaté	Arawakan	Amazonas, Colombia	A word list was collected by Alfred Russel Wallace in 1851.
c. 1850	Norn	Indo-European	Northern Isles, United Kingdom	with the death of Walter Sutherland
mid-19th century	Shinnecock	Algic	New York, United States	
mid-19th century	Betoi	Betoi-Saliban?	Orinoco Llanos	
mid-19th century	Jeikó	Macro-Jê	southeastern Piauí	
c. 1850s	Kott	Yeniseian	central Siberia, Russia	
c. 1840s	Mator	Uralic	Sayan Mountains, Russia	
after 1840s	Bororo of Cabaçal	Macro-Jê languages	Mato Grosso, Brazil	
after 1839	Gulidjan	Pama-Nyungan	Victoria, Australia	
1838	Nottoway	Iroquoian	Virginia, United States	with the death of Edith Turner
after 1837	Tiverigoto	Cariban	Venezuela	
after 1836	Wathawurrung	Pama-Nyungan	Victoria, Australia	
after 1835	Pali	Indo-European	India; Myanmar	
after 1833	Esselen	Isolate	California, United States	
after 1833	Cararí	Arawakan	Mucuim River, Amazonas, Brazil	A word list was collected by Johann Natterer in 1833.
after 1832	Güenoa	Charruan	Entre Ríos Province and Uruguay	
after 1832	Aroaqui	Arawakan	Lower Rio Negro Brazil	A word list was collected by Johann Natterer in 1832.
after 1832	Parawana	Arawakan	Lower Branco River Brazil	A word list was collected by Johann Natterer in 1832.
after 1831	Mepuri	Arawakan	Amazonas, Brazil	A word list was collected by Johann Natterer in 1831.
after 1831	Mainatari	Arawakan	Siapa River (Orinoco basin) Venezuela	A word list was collected by Johann Natterer in 1831.
after 1831	Pasé	Arawakan	Amazonas, Brazil	A word list was collected by Johann Natterer in 1831.
after 1831	Yumana	Arawakan	Amazonas, Brazil	A word list was collected by Johann Natterer in 1831.
6 June 1829	Beothuk	unclassified (Algic disputed)	Newfoundland, Canada	with the death of Shanawdithit
after 1828	Comecrudo	Comecrudan	Mexico; Texas, United States	
after 1828	Garza	Comecrudan	Mexico	
after 1828	Mamulique	Comecrudan	Nuevo León, Mexico	
c. 1827	Pimenteira	Cariban	South America	recorded by Carl Friedrich Philipp von Martius in 1819
after 1824	Amarizana	Arawakan	Meta Department, Colombia	
after 1821	Karkin	Utian	California, United States	
after 1821	Omok	Yukaghir	Sakha and Magadan in Russia	
after 1820	Koeruna	Witotoan	Amazonas, Brazil	recorded by Carl Friedrich Philipp von Martius in 1820
after 1820	Kariaí	Arawakan	Roraima, Brazil	recorded by Carl Friedrich Philipp von Martius in 1820
after 1820	Andoquero	Witotoan	Colombia	(Note: Ethnologue has mixed this up with Carapana-tapuya. The languages clearly belong to different families.)
after 1820	Waraikú	Arawakan	Brazil	recorded by Carl Friedrich Philipp von Martius in 1820
after 1819	Peerapper	Tasmanian	Tasmania, Australia	
after 1819	Arakajú	Cariban	Pará, Brazil	recorded by Carl Friedrich Philipp von Martius in 1819
after 1819	Masakará	Macro-Jê	Bahia, Brazil	recorded by Carl Friedrich Philipp von Martius in 1819
after 1819	Kotoxó	Macro-Jê	Bahia, Brazil	recorded by Carl Friedrich Philipp von Martius in 1819
after 1818	Acroá	Macro-Jê	Bahia, Brazil	
after 1818	Kamurú	Kariri	Eastern Brazil	recorded by Carl Friedrich Philipp von Martius in 1818
after 1818	Sabujá	Kariri	Bahia, Brazil	recorded by Carl Friedrich Philipp von Martius in 1818
after 1818	Koropó	Macro-Jê	Minas Gerais, Brazil	recorded by Carl Friedrich Philipp von Martius in 1818
after 1816	Menién	Macro-Jê	Bahia, Brazil	
after 1816	Mangaló	Macro-Jê	Bahia and Minas Gerais	
after 1815	Tambora	unclassified (Papuan)	Sumbawa	following the 1815 eruption of Mount Tambora.
after 1808	Nuennone	Tasmanian	Tasmania, Australia	
1800	Caquetio	Arawakan	Aruba	Speakers switched to Papiamento.
c. 1800	Krevinian	Uralic	Latvia	
c. 1800	Pallanganmiddang	Pama-Nyungan	Victoria, Australia	
c. 19th century	Assan dialect of Kott	Yeniseian	central Siberia, Russia	
c. 19th century	Coptic	Afroasiatic	Egypt	apparently only in scattered places since the 17th century; still in use as a liturgical language
c. 19th century	Crimean Gothic	Indo-European	Crimea, Ukraine	
c. 19th century	Mangue	Oto-Manguean	Central America	
c. 19th century	Sandy River Valley Sign Language	Martha's Vineyard Sign Language or isolate	Maine, United States	
c. 19th century	Volga Türki	Turkic	Idel-Ural	Evolved into Bashkir and Tatar.
19th century	Niuatoputapu	Austronesian	Niuatoputapu Island, Tonga	
19th century	Kemi Sami	Uralic	Lapland, Finland	
19th century	Mediterranean Lingua Franca	Romance-based Pidgin	Tunisia; Greece; Cyprus	
19th century	Ramaytush	Utian	California, United States	
19th century	Solombala English	English–Russian pidgin	Solombala Shipyard	
19th century	Amazon Mayoruna	Panoan	Amazon basin, Brazil, Peru, and Colombia	
early 19th century	Cochimí	Yuman-Cochimi	Baja California, Mexico	
early 19th century	Wila'	Austroasiatic	Seberang Perai, Malaysia	
early 19th century	Yurats	Samoyedic	central Siberia, Russia	

=== Early modern period ===
Date	Language	Language family	Region	Notes
late 18th century	Esuma	Kwa	southern Côte d'Ivoire	
late 18th century	Maipure	Arawakan	Upper Orinoco region	
late 18th century	Ruthenian	Indo-European	Eastern Slavic regions of Poland-Lithuania	Evolved into Belarusian, Ukrainian and Rusyn.
after 1794	Chiriba	Panoan	Moxos Province, Bolivia	Attested only with the wordlist of 7 words in Palau, Mercedes and Blanca Saiz 1989 [1794].
after 1794	Magiana	Arawakan	Bolivia	Attested only with the wordlist of 7 words in Palau, Mercedes and Blanca Saiz 1989 [1794].
after 1794	Ramanos	unclassified (isolate?)	Moxos Province, Bolivia	Attested only with the wordlist of 7 words in Palau, Mercedes and Blanca Saiz 1989 [1794].
c. 1790s	Powhatan	Algic	eastern Virginia, United States	
after 1788	Otomaco	Otomakoan	Venezuelan Llanos	Known from a wordlist by Father Gerónimo José de Luzena written in December of 1788.
after 1788	Taparita	Otomakoan	Venezuelan Llanos	Known from a wordlist by Father Gerónimo José de Luzena written in December of 1788.
26 December 1777	Cornish	Indo-European	Cornwall, England	with the death of Dolly Pentreath (Note: Possibly the last fluent native speaker of the Cornish language, was monoglot until her twenties. See Last speaker of the Cornish language.)
after 1770	Tamanaku	Cariban	Venezuela	
1770	Cuman	Turkic	north of Black Sea; Hungary	with the death of István Varró
c. 1770s	Abipón	Mataco–Guaicuru	Argentina	
by 1765	Muisca	Chibchan	Colombia	
after 1763	Susquehannock	Iroquoian	Northeastern United States	After the Conestoga massacre.
by 1763	Quingnam	unclassified	Department of La Libertad, Peru	
1760	Galwegian dialect of Scottish Gaelic	Indo-European	Scotland, United Kingdom	with the death of Margaret McMurray
3 October 1756	Polabian	Indo-European	around the Elbe river, Poland/Germany	with the death of Emerentz Schultze
1740	Pumpokol	Yeniseian	central Siberia, Russia	
late 1730s	Arin	Yeniseian	central Siberia, Russia	with the death of Arzamas Loskutov
after 1709	Dzubukuá	Kariri	Pernambuco, Brazil	Revival since 1989 by modern Kariri-Xokó people
18th century	Ajem-Turkic	Turkic	Iran, Eastern Anatolia, the South Caucasus and Dagestan	Evolved into Azerbaijani.
18th century	Classical Gaelic	Indo-European	Ireland and Scotland, United Kingdom	The literary language. Fell out of use with the collapse of Gaelic society.
18th century	Coahuilteco	Isolate/unclassified	Mexico; Texas, United States	
18th century	Loup	Algic	Massachusetts and Connecticut, United States	
18th century	Manao	Arawakan	Brazil	
18th century	Plateau Sign Language	Contact pidgin	Columbia Plateau, United States	
early 18th century	Apalachee	Muskogean	Florida, United States	
early 18th century	Old Prussian	Indo-European	Poland	being revived
by 18th century	Merya	Uralic	Yaroslavl Oblast, Russia	Reconstructed within the ideology of Meryan ethnofuturism from local toponymy and dialectology of the Upper Volga region in the 21st century.
17th to 18th century?	Acaxee	Uto-Aztecan	Northwestern Mexico	unattested; all known documentation has been lost
17th to 18th century?	Xixime	Uto-Aztecan?	Northwestern Mexico	unattested; all known documentation has been lost
by 1700	Pidgin Delaware	Delaware-based pidgin	Delaware, United States	
late 17th century	Sudovian	Indo-European	Lithuania	
after 1699	Kipeá	Kariri	Eastern Brazil	
after 1666	Old Kentish Sign Language	Village sign language	Kent, England	
after mid-17th century	Favorlang	Austronesian	Taiwan	
after 1643	Narragansett	Algic	New England, United States	
after 1640	Yao	Cariban	Trinidad and French Guiana	Attested in a 52-word 1640 word list recorded by Joannes de Laet.
after 1633	Shebayo	Arawakan	Trinidad	
c. 1635	Jurchen	Tungusic	Manchuria, China	Evolved into Manchu.
after 1618	Carolina Algonquian	Algic	North Carolina, United States	
17th century	Andalusi Arabic	Afroasiatic	southern Spain	
17th century	Armeno-Kipchak	Turkic	Crimea	
17th century	Adhari	Indo-European	Iranian Azerbaijan	
17th century	Basque–Icelandic pidgin	Basque–Icelandic Pidgin	Iceland	
17th century	Cazcan	Uto-Aztecan	Mexico	
17th century	Curonian	Indo-European	Latvia	
17th century	Ebro Valley Aragonese	Indo-European	Ebro Valley	
17th century	Etchemin	Algic	Maine, United States	
17th century	Gorgotoqui	Macro-Jê	eastern Bolivia	A 17th-century grammar has been lost.
17th century	Navarrese Romance	Indo-European	Kingdom of Navarre	
16th–18th century	Gorgani	Indo-European	Gorgan	
late 16th century	Knaanic	Indo-European	Czech Republic; Poland	
late 16th century	Laurentian	Iroquoian	Quebec/Ontario, Canada	
after 1586	Palta	unclassified	Ecuador	known from only 4 words
after 1548	Taino	Arawakan	The Bahamas and Puerto Rico	
c. 1535	Cueva	Chocoan (?)	Darién Province, Panama	The Cueva people were exterminated between 1510 and 1535 during Spanish colonization.
after 1516	Mamluk-Kipchak	Turkic	Egypt and Syria	
after 1502	Tangut	Sino-Tibetan	northwestern China; southern Mongolia	
16th century	Guanahatabey	unclassified	Pinar del Río Province and Isla de la Juventud, Cuba	only known from placenames
16th century	Guanche	unclassified, maybe Berber	Canary Islands, Spain	
16th century	Judaeo-Portuguese	Indo-European	Belmonte, Portugal	
16th century	Meshchera	Uralic	Meshchera Lowlands	
16th century	Navarro-Aragonese	Indo-European	southern Navarre, Spain	Aragonese is still spoken as a minority language in Spain.
16th century	Old Novgorod	Indo-European	Novgorod Republic	
16th century	Semigallian	Indo-European	Latvia; Lithuania	

=== Post-classical period ===
Date	Language	Language family	Region	Notes
end of 15th century	Mozarabic	Indo-European	Spain; Portugal	
after 1492	Judaeo-Aragonese	Indo-European	North Central Spain	After the Alhambra Decree
after 1492	Judaeo-Catalan	Indo-European	Eastern Spain	After the Alhambra Decree
late 15th century	Greenlandic Norse	Indo-European	Greenland	
late 15th century	Selonian	Indo-European	Latvia; Lithuania	
15th century	African Romance	Indo-European	Roman Africa	
15th century	Jassic	Indo-European	Hungary	
15th century	Old Anatolian Turkish	Turkic	Anatolia	Emerged in Anatolia late 11th century, and developed into early Ottoman Turkish.
15th century	Old Nubian	Eastern Sudanic	Nubia	Evolved into Nobiin.
15th century	Tamna	Japonic?	Tamna	
15th century	Valencian Aragonese	Indo-European	Kingdom of Valencia	
14th century	Bulgar	Turkic	Volga and Danube, Europe; Central Asia	By the 9th or 10th centuries on the Danube and by the 14th century in the Volga region. It may have ultimately given rise to the Chuvash language, which is most closely related to it.
14th century	Daylami	Indo-European	South Caspian Sea	
14th century	Franco-Italian	Indo-European	Northern Italy	
14th century	Galician-Portuguese	Indo-European	northwestern Spain, northern Portugal	Evolved into Galician, Portuguese, Eonavian and Fala. Some linguists argue that said languages could all still be considered modern varieties of Galician-Portuguese itself.
14th century	Khorezmian Turkic	Turkic	Central Asia	Evolved into Chagatai.
14th century	Old Uyghur	Turkic	Central Asia, East Asia	
14th century	West Galindian	Indo-European	northern Poland	
14th century	Zarphatic	Indo-European	northern France; west-central Germany	
after 20 June 1244	Khitan	Mongolic	Central Asia	with the death of Yelü Chucai (Note: Last person known to speak, read, and write in Khitan.)
13th century	Karakhanid	Turkic	Central Asia	Evolved into Khorezmian Turkic.
13th century	Pyu	Sino-Tibetan	central Myanmar	
13th century	Old Riojan	Indo-European	La Rioja	
13th century	Siculo-Arabic	Afroasiatic	Emirate of Sicily	Evolved into Maltese.
13th century	Skalvian	Indo-European	Scalovia	
12–13th centuries	Balhae	Tungusic?	Balhae	
12th century AD	Golyad	Indo-European	Protva basin	Only known member of the Dnieper-Oka language.
12th century AD	Khwarezmian	Indo-European	Khwarazm	
12th century AD	Pecheneg	Turkic	Eastern Europe	
between 1000 and 1300	Khazar	Turkic	northern Caucasus; Central Asia	
11th – 12th century AD	Cumbric	Indo-European	England/Scotland, United Kingdom	
11th – 12th century AD	Jewish Babylonian Aramaic	Afroasiatic	Iraq	
c. 1000	Lombardic	Indo-European	central Europe; northern Italy	
c. 1000	Moselle Romance	Indo-European	Moselle	
between 1000 and 1300	Muromian	Uralic	Vladimir Oblast, Russia	
c. 1000	Old Church Slavonic	Indo-European	Eastern Europe	still used as a liturgical language
c. 1000	Shauraseni Prakrit	Indo-European	Medieval India	
c. 1000	Sogdian	Indo-European	Sogdia	Evolved into Yaghnobi.
10th – 12th century AD	Syriac	Afroasiatic	Turkey; Iraq; Syria	now only used as liturgical language
10th – 12th century AD	Samaritan Aramaic	Afroasiatic	West Bank, Palestine; Israel	now only used as liturgical language
10th century AD	Himyaritic	Afroasiatic	Yemen	
10th century AD	Paishachi	Indo-European	North India	
10th century AD	Pannonian Latin	Indo-European	Pannonia	
10th century AD	Saka	Indo-European	Xinjiang, China	Evolved into Wakhi.
10th century AD	Zhang-Zhung	Sino-Tibetan	western Tibet (Central Asia)	
9th century AD or later	Pictish	Indo-European	Scotland, United Kingdom	
850 AD	Tocharian A	Indo-European	Tarim Basin (Central Asia)	
850 AD	Tocharian B	Indo-European	Tarim Basin	
850 AD	Tocharian C	Indo-European	Tarim Basin	
9th century AD	Gothic	Indo-European	Spain; Portugal; Italy	With the exception of Crimean Gothic
8th century AD	Aghwan	Northeast Caucasian	Azerbaijan	Evolved into Udi.
8th century AD	British Latin	Indo-European	Roman Britain	
8th century AD	Orkhon Turkic	Turkic	Eastern Europe, Central Asia, Eastern Asia	Evolved into Old Uyghur.
7th–10th century?	Goguryeo	Puyŏ, possibly Koreanic	Korea, China	
after AD 620	Rouran	Mongolic or isolate	Northern China and Mongolia	
c. 600	Avestan	Indo-European	Iran	
7th century AD	Baekje	Koreanic	Korea	may be more than one language.
7th century AD	Buyeo	Puyŏ, possibly Koreanic	Manchuria	
7th century AD	Gaya	unclassified	Korea	
7th century AD	Mahan	Koreanic?	Mahan confederacy	
after 6th century AD	Di	unclassified	western China	
6th century AD	Ancient Cappadocian	Indo-European	Anatolia	
6th century AD	Burgundian	Indo-European	Kingdom of the Burgundians	
6th century AD	Dacian	Indo-European	Balkans	Possibly evolved into Albanian, or influenced to it.
6th century AD	Gaulish	Indo-European	Gaul: France, Belgium, Germany and elsewhere	
6th century AD	Illyrian	Indo-European	western Balkans	disputed
6th century AD	Okjeo	Koreanic?	Okjeo	
6th century AD	Sabaean	Afroasiatic	Horn of Africa; Arabic Peninsula	
6th century AD	Tuyuhun	Para-Mongolic	Northern China	Spoken around AD 500.
6th century AD	Vandalic	Indo-European	Spain; North Africa	
6th century AD	Ye-Maek	Koreanic?	Yemaek	

=== Ancient period ===
Date	Language	Language family	Region	Notes
after 5th century	Wusun	Indo-European	between the Qilian Mountains and Dunhuang	
after 5th century	Tuoba	Mongolic or Turkic	Northern China	
5th – 6th century	Hadramautic	Afroasiatic	Dhofar Mountains	
before 6th century	Ligurian	unclassified, possibly Celtic or Indo-European	northwestern Italy; southeastern France	
after 453	Hunnic	unclassified, possibly Oghuric	from the Eurasian steppe into Europe	
c. AD 400	Egyptian	Afro-Asiatic	Ancient Egypt	Evolved into Coptic.
c. AD 400	Meroitic	unclassified, maybe Nubian	Sudan	
5th century	Alanic	Indo-European	Alania and Iberia	Evolved into Ossetian.
5th century	Isaurian	Indo-European	Anatolia	
5th century	Thracian	Indo-European	eastern and central Balkans	
early 5th century	Punic	Afroasiatic	North Africa	
after AD 400	Phrygian	Indo-European	southeastern Bulgaria; Anatolia	
4th century AD	Hismaic	Afroasiatic	Ḥismā Oasis	
4th century AD	Aquitanian	Isolate or Vasconic	Novempopulania and Basque Country	Possibly evolved into Basque, or is a sister language to it.
4th century AD	Galatian	Indo-European	central Anatolia	
4th century AD	Geʽez	Afroasiatic	Ethiopia; Eritrea	still used as a liturgical language
4th century AD	Biblical Hebrew	Afroasiatic	Israel	revived in the 1880s
after 351 AD	Jie	Yeniseian?	North China	Close to Pumpokol.
after 300 AD	Parthian	Indo-European	Iran	
after AD 274	Palmyrene Aramaic	Afroasiatic	Palmyrene Empire	extended to the Western Roman Empire as far as Britannia
after AD 267	Thamudic	Afroasiatic	Kingdom of Thamud	
3rd century AD	Gandhari	Indo-European	Gandhara	
3rd century AD	Rhaetic	unclassified, maybe Tyrsenian	eastern Alps	
3rd century AD	Safaitic	Afroasiatic	Syria	
3rd century AD	Sidicini	Indo-European	Italy	
3rd century AD	Xianbei	Para-Mongolic	Xianbei state	
c. 200 CE	Qatabanian	Afroasiatic	Yemen	
c. 200 CE	Wuhuan	Para-Mongolic	Inner Mongolia	
after 2nd century AD	Noric	Indo-European	Austria; Slovenia	
after 2nd century AD	Pisidian	Indo-European	southwestern Anatolia	
after AD 150	Bactrian	Indo-European	Afghanistan	
AD 150	Marsian	Indo-European	Marsica	
AD 100	Akkadian	Afroasiatic	Mesopotamia	
AD 100	Armazic	Afroasiatic	South Caucasus	
AD 100	Etruscan	Tyrsenian	central Italy	
AD 100	Hasaitic	Afroasiatic	Al-Ahsa Oasis	
c. 2nd century AD	Celtiberian	Indo-European	central-eastern Spain	
c. 2nd century AD	Gallaecian	Indo-European	northwestern Spain, northern Portugal	
2nd century AD	Lusitanian	Indo-European	Portugal, southwestern Spain	
c. 2nd century AD	Nuragic	Indo-European	Sardinia	
c. 2nd century AD	Sorothaptic	Indo-European	eastern Spain	
after 1st century AD	Xiongnu	unclassified (Yeniseian?)	Mongolia	possibly multiple languages
1st – 2nd century AD	Iberian	unclassified	Spain; France	
1st – 2nd century AD	Paeonian	Indo-European	Macedonia; Greece; Bulgaria	
c. AD 50	Lycaonian	unclassified	Lycaonia	
1st century AD	Liburnian	Indo-European	western Croatia	
1st century AD	Median	Indo-European	Persia	
1st century AD	Nabataean Arabic	Afro-Asiatic	Levant, Sinai Peninsula and northwest Arabia	
1st century AD	Venetic	Indo-European	northeastern Italy	
c. AD 100	Oscan	Indo-European	southern Italy	
50 BC	Cisalpine Gaulish	Indo-European	Cisalpine Gaul	
1st century BC	Elymian	unclassified	western Sicily	
1st century BC	Lycian	Indo-European	southwestern Anatolia	
1st century BC	Lydian	Indo-European	western Anatolia	
1st century BC	Messapic	Indo-European	Apulia, Italy	
1st century BC	Mysian	Indo-European	northwestern Anatolia	
1st century BC	Sabine	Indo-European	central Italy	
1st century BC	Sicanian	unclassified	central Sicily	
1st century BC	Sicel	Indo-European	eastern Sicily	
1st century BC	Umbrian	Indo-European	central Italy	
early 1st millennium BC	Eteocretan	Isolate/unclassified	Crete, Greece	
1st millennium BC	Milyan	Indo-European	Anatolia	
c. 100 BC	Paelignian	Indo-European	Valle Peligna	
100 BC	Vestinian	Indo-European	east-central Italy	
c. 150 BC	Faliscan	Indo-European	Tuscany/Latium, Italy	
c. 100 BC	Minaean	Afro-Asiatic	Yemen	
2nd century BC	Phoenician	Afro-Asiatic	Canaan, North Africa, Cyprus, Iberia, Sicily, Malta and Sardinia	
232 BC	Ashokan Prakrit	Indo-European	South Asia	
c. 3rd century BC	Aequian	Indo-European	Latium, east-central Italy	
c. 3rd century BC	Carian	Indo-European	southwestern Anatolia	
c. 3rd century BC	Elu	Indo-European	Sri Lanka	Evolved into Sinhala and Dhivehi.
c. 3rd century BC	Lucanian	Indo-European	Lucania	
c. 3rd century BC	Siculian	Indo-European	Sicily	
c. 3rd century BC	Sidetic	Indo-European	southwestern Anatolia	
c. 3rd century BC	Volscian	Indo-European	Italy; Latium	
c. 3rd century BC	Aeolian	Indo-European	Greece; Lesbos; Western Anatolia	
c. 200 BC	Numidian	Afro-Asiatic	Numidia	
early 4th century BC	Eteocypriot	Isolate/unclassified	Cyprus	
4th century BC	Ancient Macedonian	Indo-European	northeastern Greece	
4th century BC	Kassite	Hurro-Urartian?	Babylon	
4th century BC	South Picene	Indo-European	Picenum	
c. 300 BC	Marrucinian	Indo-European	Chieti	
c. 300 BC	Philistine	unclassified, maybe Indo-European	Israel; Palestine; Lebanon	
c. 350 BC	Elamite	Isolate	Persia; southern Mesopotamia	
after 5th century BC	Tartessian	unclassified	Spain	
5th century BC	Ammonite	Afroasiatic	northwestern Jordan	
5th century BC	Moabite	Afroasiatic	northwestern Jordan	
5th century BC	North Picene	unclassified	Picenum	
c. 400 BC	Lepontic	Indo-European	northern Italy	
early 5th century BC	Oenotrian	Indo-European	Southern Italy	
second half of the 1st millennium BC	Dadanitic	Afroasiatic	Lihyan	
after 6th century BC	Lemnian	Tyrsenian	Lemnos, Greece	
second half of the 6th century BC	Taymanitic	Afroasiatic	Tayma	
500 BC	Lanuvian	Indo-European	Lanuvium	
500 BC	Praenestinian	Indo-European	Palestrina	
500 BC	Pre-Samnite	Indo-European	Campania	
6th century BC	Edomite	Afroasiatic	southwestern Jordan	
6th century BC	Urartian	Hurro-Urartian	Armenia; Georgia; Iraq; Anatolia	
620–580 BC	Cimmerian	Indo-European	North Caucasus and West Asia	
c. 600 BC	Dumaitic	Afroasiatic	Dumat al-Jandal	
c. 600 BC	Lullubian	Hurro-Urartian?	Lullubi Kingdom	
c. 600 BC	Luwian	Indo-European	Anatolia; northern Syria	
730s BC	Samalian	Afro-Asiatic	Samʾal	
770s BC	South Gileadite	Afro-Asiatic	Deir Alla	
after 800 BC	Kaskian	Unclassified	Northeastern Anatolia and Colchis	
c. 1000 BC	Hurrian	Hurro-Urartian	Anatolia; Syria; Mesopotamia	
c. 1050 BC	Cypro-Minoan	unclassified	Cyprus	may have evolved into Eteocypriot.
c. 1100 BC	Sutean	Afro-Asiatic	Northeast Syria	Spoken around 2100 BC
c. 1100 BC	Hittite	Indo-European	Anatolia	
after 1170 BC	Ugaritic	Afroasiatic	Syria	following the destruction of Ugarit
after 1200 BC	Kalasmaic	Indo-European	Kalasma	
c. 1200 BC	Mycenaean Greek	Indo-European	Mycenaean Greece and western Anatolia	
after 1300s BC	Mitanni-Aryan	Indo-European	Mitanni	
c. 1300 BC	Palaic	Indo-European	northwest Anatolia	
c. 1450 BC	Minoan	unclassified	Crete	may have evolved into Eteocretan.
c. 1500 BC	Hattic	unclassified, possibly Northwest Caucasian	Anatolia	
c. 1600 BC	Amorite	Afro-Asiatic	Levant	
c. 1900 BC	Harappan	unclassified, possibly Dravidian	Indus River	
c. 2000-1800 BC	Sumerian	Isolate	Mesopotamia	used as a literary and liturgical language until about 100 AD
3rd-2nd millennium BC	Subarian	Hurro-Urartian?	Subartu	
after 2200 BC	Gutian	unclassified	Zagros Mountains?	
3rd millennium BC	Eblaite	Afroasiatic	Syria	

=== Unknown date ===
Language	Language family	Region	Notes
Arma-Pozo	Chocoan?	Colombia	
Community of Villages Aragonese	Indo-European	Kingdom of Aragon	
Duit	Chibcha	Boyacá, Colombia	One fragment analysed by scholar Ezequiel Uricoechea in 1871.
Ermitaño	Chavacano	Ermita, Manila, Philippines	Spanish-based creole
Garachi	Indo-European	Azerbaijan	
Huetar	Chibchan	Alajuela, Costa Rica	
Juma	Cariban	Rondônia, Brazil	
Kambojan	Indo-European	Kamboja Kingdom	
Kulon	Austronesian	Taiwan	
Loun	Austronesian	Maluku Islands	
Maynas	Cahuapanan	Loreto, Peru	
Nam	Sino-Tibetan	Central Asia	
Nutabe	Chibchan	Santa Fe de Antioquia, Colombia	
Nyawaygi	Pama-Nyungan	Queensland, Australia	last speaker was Willie Seaton
Old Catio	Chibchan	Santa Fe de Antioquia, Colombia	
Olmec	unclassified, possibly Mixe-Zoque	Mexico	
Pahlavani	Indo-European	Chakhansur District	
Paleo-Corsican	unclassified	Corsica	
Quimbaya	unclassified	Colombia	very poorly attested
Rocorona	Chapacuran	Bolivia	
Sorung	Austronesian	Erromango	
Suebian	Indo-European	Elbe basin and northwestern Iberia	
Vazimba	Austronesian	Madagascar	
Villa Viciosa Agta	Austronesian	Villaviciosa, Abra Philippines	unattested
Waamwang	Austronesian	Voh, New Caledonia	
Western Jicaque	Tolan	Honduras	
Xakriabá	Macro-Jê	Minas Gerais state, Brazil	
Zacateco	Uto-Aztecan	Zacatecas, Durango	Wordlist appears to be close to Huichol

== See also ==
- Extinct language
- Language death
- Lists of endangered languages
- Lists of extinct languages

== Notes ==
By ISO 639-3 code
Enter an ISO code to find the corresponding language article.
