= Trans–São Francisco languages =

Proposed language grouping

Trans–São Francisco
- Transanfranciscano
- Geographic distribution: São Francisco River basin of Northeast Brazil
- Linguistic classification: Macro-Jê: Eastern; Trans–São Francisco
- Subdivisions: Krenák; Maxakalí; ? Kamakã †

Language codes
- Glottolog: None
- The Macro-Jê families according to Kaufman

The Trans–São Francisco languages (Portuguese: Transanfranciscano) are a proposed grouping of languages within Macro-Jê. They consist of the Krenák, Maxakalían, and possibly also the Kamakã families. The Trans–São Francisco group was originally proposed and demonstrated by Nikulin and Silva (2020) under the name of Maxakalí-Krenák.

They are named after the São Francisco River of Northeast Brazil.

== Classification ==
Internal classification of Trans–São Francisco by Nikulin (2020):

- Trans–São Francisco
  - Krenák (Borum)
  - Maxakalían
    - Malalí
    - Nuclear Maxakalían
      - Maxakalí
      - Ritual Maxakalí; Makoní
      - Pataxó; Pataxó-Hãhãhãe
      - Koropó
  - ? Kamakã (possibly part of Trans–São Francisco)
    - Masakará
    - Southern Kamakã
      - Menien
      - Kamakã; Kotoxó/Mongoyó

== Proto-language ==
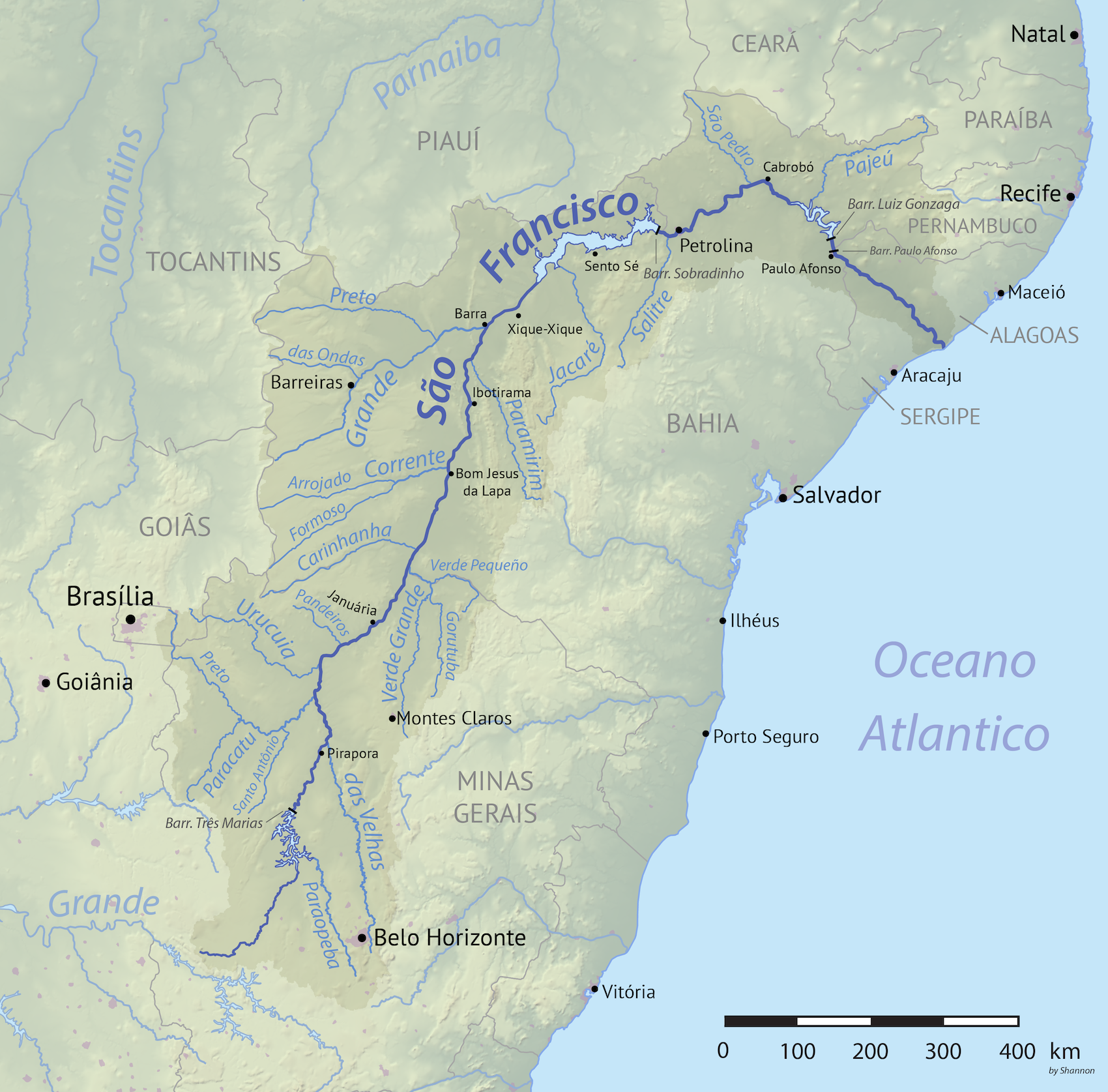
Map of the São Francisco River basin

Proto-Trans–São Francisco
- Reconstruction of: Trans–São Francisco languages
- Reconstructed ancestor: Proto-Macro-Jê
- Lower-order reconstructions: Proto-Kamakã

Proto-Trans–São Francisco has been reconstructed by Nikulin (2020), while there is also a Proto-Kamakã reconstruction by Martins (2007).

== See also ==
- Macro-Jê languages
- List of unclassified languages of South America § Northeast Brazil
