= List of extinct Indigenous peoples of Brazil =

At the time of the invasion of Brazil by the Europeans, a total of 2,000 Indigenous nations, divided into several thousand tribes, existed in Brazil. The total number of Native tribes which inhabited present day Brazil at the time of first contact is disputed and difficult to ascertain. The names of large number of tribes who were exterminated as a result of intertribal warfare are not recorded anywhere and so is the case of several smaller tribes who were wiped out by the colonizers. Curt Nimuendajú gives a list of 1,400 nations in his monumental work Mapa etno-histórico do Brasil e regiões adjacentes, but he ignored many smaller (extinct) tribes in Eastern Brazil, and was at the time of writing unaware of some other tribes which were uncontacted at that time. Currently only 200 nations (790 tribes) are alive, with no survivors being reported for the remaining nations. However, this does not mean their bloodlines are extinct; only their cultures. Brazilian Pardo and Mestizo population have mostly unknown indigenous backgrounds, some or several of them likely stemming from extinct cultures. The Bandeirantes hunted and enslaved indigenous peoples in the then unexplored interior of Brazil from the 16th to the early 19th century. The indigenous peoples were eventually acculturated and integrated into European civilization.

Most of the recorded extinctions of the Brazilian tribes were caused by warfare with the neo-Brazilians and from the epidemics which were sometimes deliberately spread by the colonizers. Intertribal warfare between various native Brazilian tribes also caused a significant number of extinctions. For example, the Matses, one of the tribes in the Vale do Javari region exterminated at least 4 smaller tribes during the 20th century.

== Famous extinct Brazilian nations ==
Out of the more than 1,800 extinct nations and thousands of tribes, names are available for only a few of them.

- Abacaxis - Abacaxis River
- Abaeté - Tupian (?). Minas Gerais. Extinct since the 18th century
- Abaeté do Rio Madeira - Same as Abacátes (?). Rio Madeira, Amazonas
- Abarés - Northeast Brazil
- Acauas - Also known as Acauans - Lower Amazon
- Achouaris - Rio Jurua and Rio Solimoes
- Acroa - Bahia province - related to Xokleng people
- Addaraias - Rio Negro
- Adorias - Near Amazon River - extinct since the start of the 19th century
- Aipatsé - Previously inhabited the Xingu river region - became extinct during the 1980s
- Anumania - Previously inhabited the Xingu river region
- Aracadaini - Amazonas
- Araés - Goias
- Araraus - Rio Jatapu, Amazonas
- Ariquéns - Rio Jamari, Rondonia
- Amena-Diapá - Once inhabited the region around São Felipe river, in the Acre - Amazonas border
- Bacuéns - Minas Gerais
- Beaquéos - Mato Grosso do Sul
- Boimés - Sergipe
- Boraris - Para
- Burukäyo - Related to the Arikapú
- Cabixiana - Near Corumbiara, Rondônia. Became extinct during the 1940s.
- Caeté - Once inhabited the region near the mouth of river São Francisco to the island of Itamaracá.
- Camamu - Ceara
- Campe - Related to Makurap. From Rio Mequens, Rondonia. Extinct since early 20th century.
- Canela, Kenkateye - Part of the Canela nation. Originally from Serra das Alpercatas, Maranhao. According to Nimuendajú, this tribe became extinct after the ranchers massacred them in 1913.
- Cauixana - Arawakan. From Rio Mauapari. Extinct since early 20th century.
- Cataguéo - Related to Caduveo
- Coropó - Espirito Santo
- Cracmuns - Minas Gerais
- Crateús - Piaui
- Cucoecamecrãs - Maranhao
- Cujigeneris - Amazonas
- Cupinharós - Once lived in Piaui
- Goitacá - Previously inhabited a large stretch of the eastern Brazilian coast, from the São Mateus River to the Paraíba do Sul River.
- Guatiedéos - Mato Grosso do Sul.
- Guatiedéo - Related to Caduveo
- Gueguê - Piaui
- Guayanases - Are known to have inhabited the Plains of Piratininga which is now the city of São Paulo.
- Irã-Amráire - One of the Kayapo nations. Numbered 3,000 in 1900, divided into five tribes (Kren-re, Nhangagakrin, Kuben Ken Kam, Me Mranh & Mejôt´yr). Became extinct in the 20th century.
- Jeikó - Extinct since the 19th century.
- Kinikinao - Matro Grosso do Sul. Extinct in mid-20th century.
- Kutenabu (Kustenau) - Previously inhabited the Xingu river region. Became extinct in 20th century The last two survivors, a woman and her son, were assimilated into the Waura.
- Maxubí - Related to the Arikapú.
- Manitsawa - Previously inhabited the Xingu river region
- Mbaya - Guaycuruan speakers and nomads of the Gran Chaco, who migrated to Mato Grosso do Sul in the late 18th century. Survived by the Kadiweu.
- Naravute - Previously inhabited the Xingu river region. Became extinct during the 1940s.
- Purí - Previously resided in coastal Brazil.
- Tapajós - Amazonas
- Tupinambá - Once inhabited the Atlantic coast of Brazil.
- Urucu - Related to Botocudo, Minas Gerais.
- Western Bororo - Extinct since the end of 19th century.

== Recent extinctions ==
According to Darcy Ribeiro, a total of 87 tribes became extinct during the 1900-57 period. Another 38 became Assimilated (detribalized and merged in to the general population).

Recorded extinctions of Brazilian tribes during the 1900–1957 time period:

Tribe*	Language Family	Location
Aipatse	Carib	Rio Culuene, MT
Aminape	Tupi	Rio Mequens, RO
Apaniekra	Je	Rio Porquinhos, Maranhão
Apiaka	Tupi	Upper Rio Tapajós
Arara do Xingu [Pariri, Timirem.etc.]	Carib	Between Xingu and Tocantins
Arara [4 different tribes]	NA	1. Jamaxim 2. Manicore 3. Rio Preto 4. Rio Guaraibas, PA/AM
Arawine	Tupi	Rio 7 de Setembro, MT
Ariken	Tupi	Between Rio Candeia and Rio Jamari, RO
Arua	Tupi	Rio Branco, RO
Baenan	Baenan	Left bank of Rio Pardo, Bahia
Botocudos [Pojixa, Nakreehe, Minajirum, Jiporok, Gutkrak, Krenak]	Botocudos	Bahia & Minas Gerais
Emerilon	Tupi	Far North Amapa
Espinhos	Pano	Rio Corumaha, Acre
Guarategaja	Tupi	Rio Mequens, RO
Huari	Huari	Rio Corumbiara, RO
Itogapuk	Tupi	Rio Madeirinha, AM
Ipotewat	Tupi	Upper Cacoal, RO
Jabutifed	Tupi	Between Rio Cacoal & Rio Riosinho, RO
Jabuti	NA	Upper Rio Branco
Kabixiana	Tupi	Upper Rio Corumbiara, RO
Kamakan	Kamakan	Bahia
Kanamari	Katukina	Upper Inauini, AM
Karipuna do Rondonia	Pano	Rio Capivari, RO
Karitiana	Tupi	Alto Rio Candeias, AM
Katiana	Aruak	Upper Rio Purus
Kaxarari	Aruak	Upper Rio Curuquete, AM-AC
Kayapo-Kradau	Je	N. Araguaia, S.Para
Kayapo do Sul	Je	Boundary of Minas Gerais and São Paulo
Kayuixana	Aruak	Between Rio Japura and Rio Solimoes, AM
Kenkateye	Je	Rio Alpercatas, Maranhao
Kepkiriwat	Tupi	Rio Pimenta Bueno, RO
Kinikinao	Aruak	Aquidauana, MS
Krem Ye	Je	Maranhão - Para
Krikati	Je	Maranhão
Kujijineri	Aruak	Between Upper Envira and Curumaha, Acre
Kuniba	Aruak	Between Juruasinho and Jutai, AM
Kurina	Pano	Rio Jutai & Rio Jandiatuba, AM
Kuruaya	Tupi	Rio Jamaxim, S Para
Kustenao	Aruak	Rio Batovi and Rio Ronuro, MT
Kuyanawa	Pano	NW. Acre
Layana	Aruak	Rio Miranda, MS
Makurap	Tupi	Rio Branco, RO
Maniteneri	Aruak	Rio Purus, Acre
Manitsawa	Tupi	Upper Xingu, MT
Marakana	NA	Mountains south of Rio Uraricoera, Roraima
Marawa	Aruak	Lower Jutai, AM
Matanawi	Matanawi	Lower Marmelos, AM
Mayoruna	Pano	Rio Javari, AM
Mialat	Tupi	Upper Leitao, RO
Miranha	Witoto	Rio Tefe, Rio Caicara, AM
Monde or Sanamaika	Tupi	Right of Pimenta Bueno, RO
Naravute	Carib	Middle Culuene, MT
Natu	NA	Sergipe
Ofaye	Ofaie	MS
Oti	Oti	Campos Novos, São Paulo
Oyanpik or Wayampi	Tupi	Oiapoque, Amapa
Palmelas	Carib	Right of Rio Guapore, RO
Parawa [Hon, Maro-Djapa]	Katukina	Left of Upper Jurua, AM
Pase	Aruak	Lower Rio Ica, AM
Pataxo-Hahahai	Pataxo	Jequitinhonha, Bahia
Pauxi	Carib	Right of Middle Cumina, Para
Pauxiana	Carib	Between Rio Mocajai and Rio Catrimani, Roraima
Payaguá	Guaycuruan?	Along the Paraguay River and in Mato Grosso do Sul. The last Payaguá died in 1942.
Poyanawa	Pano	Upper Rio Moa, Acre
Purukoto	Carib	Maraca Island, Rio Uraricoera, Roraima
Rama Rama	Tupi	Rio Anari & Rio Machadinho, RO
Sakuya	Pano	Extreme NW Acre
Sanamaika	Tupi	Left of Pimenta Bueno, RO
Takuatep	Tupi	Rio Tamuripa, RO
Tora	Chapacura	Lower Marmelos, AM
Tsuva	Carib	Middle Culuene, MT
Turiwára	Tupi	Maranhão
Txakamekra	Je	Rio das Flores, Maranhão
Urumi	Tupi	Right of Rio Jiparana, RO
Wainuma	Aruak	Middle Japura, Amazonas - Colombia border
Warekena	Aruak	Rio Icana and Rio Xie, NW AM
Wayoro	NA	Upper Rio Branco, RO
Xipaya	Tupi	Rio Iriri & Rio Curua, Para
Yuberi	Aruak	Lower Tapaua & Middle Purus, AM
Yuma	NA	Upper Ipixuna & Tabocal, AM
Yuri	Ticuna-Yuri	Between Ica, Japura & Solimões

*Ribeiro grouped several nations into one in certain cases. For example, the Arara are actually 4 different tribes, which may or may not be linguistically and ethnically related. In such cases, the names of the known individual nations are given in Square Brackets.
In some cases, the tribes which were classified as extinct later re-emerged and exerted their identity. Examples are Krenak and Apiacá
In certain other cases, tribes which became extinct in Brasil existed as a living nation elsewhere, such as the Oyanpik
