= Jaiko =

Jaiko may refer to:

- Jeikó language, also spelled Jaiko
- Jaiko (ジャイ子) Jaiko Gouda List of Doraemon characters
- "Jaiko" (song), a 2013 single by Eiko Shimamiya

== See also ==
- Jaicko (born 1991), Bajan contemporary pop music singer/songwriter
