= Guerén dialect =

Extinct Botocudoan language of Brazil

Gueren
- Guêren
- Native to: Brazil
- Region: Minas Gerais
- Ethnicity: Guerén
- Extinct: after 1908
- Language family: Macro-Jê: Krenak (Botocudo); Gueren

Language codes
- ISO 639-3: None (mis)
- Glottolog: guer1242

Guerén (Guêren) is an extinct Botocudoan dialect of Brazil, related to Krenak. Today, several thousand Guerén people live in Olivença (now a district of Ilhéus), but they no longer speak the language. A single Borum individual was encountered in the winter of 1908 who knew the language.

== Vocabulary ==
=== Etienne (1909) ===
Borum vocabulary
gloss	Borum
woman	cunhan
girl	cunhan-taïm
man	comerin-assu
child	kuruk
boy	comerin
mother	chidi-ta
father	chidé-coroca
uncle	chidé-mirim
city	bourbousi
house	schevi
dwellings	kijiemme
animal	vacum
fish	pirà
bird	sombrera
sun	manoué
head	acanga
mouth	erù
nose	ti
eyes	sessa
body	chidé
hair	moufouïfi
ears	nabi
hand	chidé
foot	neaoua
finger	poussà
teeth	sereagna
nails	piricha-mirin
