= Malalí language =

Extinct Maxakalian language of Brazil

Malalí
- Native to: Brazil
- Region: Minas Gerais
- Ethnicity: 30 Malalí (1862)
- Extinct: late 19th century
- Language family: Macro-Jê: Maxakalían; Malalí

Language codes
- ISO 639-3: None (mis)
- Glottolog: mala1432

Malalí is an extinct Maxakalian language of Brazil, formerly spoken in the state of Minas Gerais. Little is known of Malalí other than a few wordlists recorded in the 19th century by European explorers; however, they reveal that Malalí was the most divergent member of the Maxakalían subgroup of the Macro-Jê languages.

== Geographical distribution ==
Malalí was historically spoken in an area between the Jequitinhonha River, Araçuaí River, and Suaçuí Grande River near Minas Novas, Minas Gerais.

== Documentation ==
Two wordlists of Malalí were recorded in the early 19th century by Prince Maximilian of Wied-Neuwied (1826) and Augustin Saint-Hilaire (1830). These form the only contemporary documentation of the language. Both wordlists are of extremely limited quality, however.

== Classification ==
Malalí has been shown to be the most divergent member of the Maxakalían language family. It is conservative compared to other members of the family, displaying certain phonological traits and sharing lexical retentions with Krenák, which have been lost in the other languages. Maxakalian, along with Krenák and possibly Kamakã, form the Trans–São Francisco branch of the Macro-Jê language family.

Historically, the classification of Malalí was disputed, with scholars such as Rivet and Loukotka correctly placing Malalí in the Maxakalían family, while others, such as Curt Nimuendajú, treated it as a distinct language family instead.

== Phonology ==
Reconstructed Malali phonemes are as follows.

=== Consonants ===
The European explorers described Malali as a language with many guttural and nasal sounds.

Malalí consonants
| | Labial | Dental/Alveolar | Palatal | Velar | Glottal |
|---|---|---|---|---|---|
| Voiceless obstruent | p | t | s [s~ʃ] | k | |
| Nasal | m | n | | ŋ | |
| Approximant | w | | j | | h |

[ɲ] occurs as an allophone of /j/ before nasal vowel nuclei. All consonants except /ŋ/ may occur in the onset of a syllable, although this may be simply due to a lack of attestation in the corpus. /m, j, t, k, ŋ/ are attested in the coda position.

=== Vowels ===
| | Front | | Central | | Back | |
| | plain | nasal | plain | nasal | plain | nasal |
|---|---|---|---|---|---|---|
| Non-low | i [i ~ ɪ ~ e] | ẽ [ẽ ~ ĩ] | ə | ə̃ | o | õ |
| Low | ɛ | ẽ [ẽ ~ ĩ] | a | ã | ɒ | ɒ̃ |

== Vocabulary ==
Malalí vocabulary
| Gloss | Malalí |
|---|---|
| God | tupán |
| church | tupánhué |
| fire | coiá |
| water | cheché |
| shirt | camisán |
| axe | pí |
| father | manaiamcá |
| mother | itá |
