= YCN =

YCN or ycn may refer to:

- Cochrane Aerodrome, Ontario, Canada, IATA code YCN
- Yucuna language, spoken in Colombia, ISO 639-3 language code ycn
