= Nakrehé dialect =

Dialect of Krenak

Nakrehé
- Native to: Brazil
- Region: Minas Gerais
- Native speakers: (few cited 1999)
- Language family: Macro-Gê: Krenak (Botocudo); Nakrehé

Language codes
- ISO 639-3: None (mis)
- Glottolog: nakr1234

Nakrehé is a Botocudoan dialect of Brazil, related to Krenak.
