= Sapara language =

Sapara language may refer to the following languages of the Amazon:

- Sapará language, an extinct Cariban language
- Sápara language, or Zaparo, a Zaparoan language
