= Yabutian languages =

Group of two related languages of Brazil

Yabutian
- Jabutian
- Geographic distribution: Rondônia, Brazil
- Linguistic classification: Macro-Jê: Yabutian
- Subdivisions: Arikapú (Maxubí); Djeoromitxi (Yabutí/Jabotí)

Language codes
- Glottolog: jabu1249
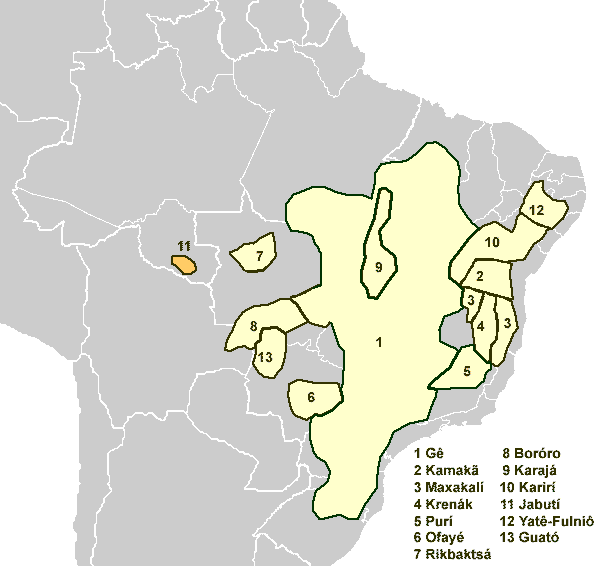

The Yabutian or Jabutian languages are two similar moribund languages of southern Rondônia, Brazil, namely Arikapú (Maxubí) and Djeoromitxi (Yabutí/Jabotí). They are members of the Macro-Jê language family. Maxubí was sometimes seen as a distinct language, but is now evaluated as representing Arikapú.

== Proto-language ==
Proto-Jabutí
- Reconstruction of: Yabutian languages
- Reconstructed ancestor: Proto-Macro-Jê

=== Phonology ===
The following phonemes are reconstructed:

Vowels
	Front		Central		Back	
	oral	nasal	oral	nasal	oral	nasal
Close	*i	*ĩ	*ɨ	*ɨ̃	*u	*ũ
Near-close	*ɪ					
Mid			*ə	*ə̃		
Open-mid		*ɛ̃			*ɔ	*ɔ̃
Open			*a	*ã		

Consonants
		Bilabial	Alveolar	Palatal	Velar	Glottal
Occlusive	voiceless	*p	*t	*tʃ	*k	
Occlusive	voiced	*m	*n	*dʒ		
Continuant			*ɾ	*j	*w	*h

- *m, *n are thought to have had oral allophones [b, d] as in modern Arikapú and Djeoromitxi.

=== Lexicon ===
Proto-Jabutí reconstructions by van der Voort (2007):

Proto-Jabutí reconstructions by van der Voort (2007

gloss	Proto-Jabutí
'kind of yam'	*mu(rε)
'sun'	*tõhã
'moon'	(*kupa)
'water (n); liquid'	*miru
'LOC'	*(-)tʃε
'NOM'	*h.
'BENEFICIARY'	(*εnɨ̃)
'classifier (skin)'	*-kakə
'AUG'	*-tʃitʃi
'ABL'	*kunĩ
'DAT'	*ri
'to remove'	*kokɨ
'water, liquid'	(*ɨ)
'to squeeze liquid'	*ɨmĩ
'needle'	*pudʒi
'to hang (up), to tie (up)'	*tətʃəj
'clay for making pots and dishes'	*mr(.)
'INTENS.'	*(-)wεhε
'container, large leaf, bag'	*təkə
'bench, mat'	*nĩpraj
'belly'	*prika
'shell, nutshell, bug/beetle'	*kakə
'tooth'	*tʃo
'mouth'	*tʃa-, *tʃako
'arm, branch'	*tʃapa
'to play'	*hãtõj
'earring'	*nĩpɨkuj
'monkey species (Callithrix jacchus)' (macaco sauim)	*mihi
'robust capuchin monkey' (macaco prego)	*mirə
'hair on backside (?)'	*kaw
'way, path'	*wɪ
'field'	*rɛhi
'meat; flesh'	*nĩ
'classifier (meat)'	*-nĩ
'tick'	*tʃitʃika
'hole; classifier (hole)'	*-ko
'small basket'	*pupuka
'to cry/weep/sing/shout'	*mõ
'to suck'	*u
'to rain'	*rõko
'cicada'	*piti
'clear; light (n)'	*praj
'snake'	*mrãj
'calango (kind of lizard)'	*mrãjdʒi
'lizard genus (Tupinambis)'	*tʃaurə
'to cover'	*hεtʃəj(to)
'to give'	*ũ
'to take away, to get, to catch'	*hɨ̃j
'to eat; to bite'	*ku
'to eat'	*pu
'pamonha (traditional food), food; classifier (pamonha, food)'	*nũ
'COM'	*pakəj
'to add; COM'	*pakə
'to give orders, to command'	*mətɨ̃
'to tell, to teach'	*pamo
'heart'	*mə(tutu)ka
'haircut, lap/flap'	*kuro
'to boil'	*toto
'termite'	*irε
'to heal/cure, to pray'	*wi
'agouti'	*təri
'finger'	*nĩku
'to keep/have, to put, to stash/hide'	*dʒi
'to lie (down)'	(*...rãj)
'son, daughter, cub, offspring'	*kraj
'son'	*wikoko
'niece'	*prõ
'to hurt; ill, sour/harsh, strong'	*tʃomi
'to sleep'	*nũtõ
'leaf, thorn; classifier (thorn)'	*-nĩ
'to stretch/pull/arrange'	*tə(j)təj
'liver'	*mə
'cord, rope'	*tʃoko
'string, cord'	*tʃukə
'song/singing (?)'	*tʃua
'breechcloth string'	*unĩ
'tucuma palm; rope made from tucuma palm'	*nũrõ
'arrow shaft'	*məku
'arrow splinter'	*itʃopu
'flower'	*tʃawa
'tree, log, stick'	*ku
'fire'	*pitʃə
'ashes'	*pitʃə(mrə)
'eye'	*hãka(rε)
'fat, grease'	*tũ(ka)
'aunt'	*dʒikũ(ro)
'to put/insert; to change clothes'	*tɨ̃
'INSTR'	*nə
'to go, to walk'	(*kərεj)
'tayra (weasel species)' (irara, papa-mel)	*mεjmia
'older sister'	*tʃuhε
'new, young'	*kamu
'blackbird genera (Psarocolius)' (japu, rubixá)	*(a)rimu
'jug'	*məro
'pot, pan, jug'	*wa
'walking palm leaf'	*kumɛ̃
'peach palm'	*onɨ̃
'kind of indigenous frame for grilling meat or fish'	*kamεkə
'to grill on a jirau'	*rĩ
'knee'	*mε̃pε
'tongue'	*nu(ku)tə(rε)
'female, mother'	*dʒi
'wife'	*krajdʒi
'grandmother'	*kurε
'manioc'	*murε
'hand'	*nĩ.u
'to chew'	*pa
'to kill (by blow)'	*t.mr.
'worm, larva; classifier (worm)'	*-rε
'young girl'	*nũnɨka
'to grind'	*kũ
'mosquito'	*patʃĩ
'woman'	*paku
'to bathe'	*tʃo
'NEG; no'	*tõ
'no'	*mãj
'bone'	*dʒi, *i
'night'	*patʃitʃu
'name'	*tõhĩ
'cloud'	*mε̃(ko)
'ear'	*nĩpɨ
'other; companion'	*tʃanãj
'to hear; to know'	*mə
'egg'	*(.)ε̃
'male; father'	*tʃu, *tʃutʃi
'husband'	*krajtʃu
'grandfather'	*tʃuta
'foot'	*praj
'stone'	*kra
'breasts, chest'	*nunɨ
'skin, leather, bark; classifier (leather, skin)'	*kə
'body hair, down, hair'	*kəmõ
'little'	*kokə
'to throw, to lose, to drop, to spill'	(*k...aj)
'to get lost'	*atõ
'to weigh; heavy'	*kumɨ
'neck'	*poko
'peanut'	*kumrε̃j
'aricuri kernel'	*mətaj
'cluster of aricuri coconuts'	*mətajtʃu
'Brazil nut tree'	*urə
'aricuri; straw; green coconut'	*urõ
'well (spring)'	*kawiru
'bridge'	*mirukurõ
'door'	*mitʃakə
'tired'	*tʃamə
'we (1PL)'	*hi..., *hi-
'you (2SG/PL)'	*a
'lung'	*mə(ki)rɪ
'pus'	*tʃu
'to burn (tr. v)'	*tʃə(...)
'hot'	*tʃə
'round'	*ka
'classifier (round)'	*-ka
'lips; spit/saliva'	*tʃokə
'toad'	(*.ka)
'dry'	*karo
'seed, kernel'	*hã
'classifier (seed, kernel)'	*-hã
'to go away'	*kũ
'on (top)'	*tʃutʃε
'snuff, tobacco, cigarette'	*padʒi
'tamanduá'	(*patʃuri)
'tortoise'	*mi.ku
'armadillo'	*tõw
'to fear'	*pɨ
'land, earth'	*mĩ(ka)
'yard, square'	*miku
'testicles'	*nũ(.)ε̃ka
'all ('finished')'	(*...tã)
'claw, nail'	*nĩkətaj
'vulture'	*tõtõtʃi
'deer'	*kurɨj
'old'	*rõjtʃi
'to see'	*arã
'green'	*kapɨ
'red'	*nũr(ə̃)o
'to come (arrive)'	*prəj
'to come back/return'	*m(.)rε̃hε̃
'to want'	*iro
'fish'	*minũ
'slowly'	*hãt.j
'reed'	*kunĩkurõ
'half'	*mə
'genipap fruit'	*mɪ
'"right?", "isn't it?"'	*nĩ
'hat'	*kanũ
'Brazilian tinamou bird' (inambu relógio)	*dʒui
'general term for the tinamou bird genus'	*mɨkraj
'cotton'	*tʃamuj
'place'	*kutʃiprajka
'big cará (kind of yam)'	*mutʃitʃi
'achiote'	*kutʃamrəj
'to salt'	*nɨ
'nettle'	*nõ
'tree species (Vochysia haenkeana)' (escorrega-macaco)	*hawajtε
'sticky'	*kanə
'arrowleaf elephant's ear (plant)' (taioba)	*m(.)rε̃
'lamp, candle, torch; tar/pitch'	*hãtjə
'sugar, cane'	*mεkɨ
'to pour, to flow/run, to throw'	*kuhi
'yellow'	*numuj
'to stir, to row; mixture'	*kotʃu
'point'	*nĩnũ
'hawk'	*pɨ̃jkuri
'plug for the nose'	*nĩkoku
'small larva'	*urɨ
'aricuri larva'	*tʃanõ
'hog plum (tree)' (cajá)	*urənĩ
'fish poison plant' (timbó)	*tanãj
'to beat (fish poison); to knock/bring down'	*prõ
'stump'	*prajka
'tree species (Cecropia)' (umbaúba)	*tõwkuri
'to form/shape, to weave, to draw up'	*pətʃa
'ingá (tree genus)'	*tʃumɨ̃
'to bring/bear'	*tə
'ripe, to ripen'	*tʃu
'necklace'	*m(.)rɨ̃(to)

For a list of Proto-Jabutí reconstructions by Nikulin (2020), see the corresponding Portuguese article.
