= Arikapú language =

Yabutian language of Brazil

Arikapú
- Maxubí
- Arikapú
- Native to: Brazil
- Region: Rondônia, at the headwaters of the Rio Branco
- Ethnicity: Arikapú
- Native speakers: 1 (2018)
- Language family: Macro-Jê: Yabutian; Arikapú
- Writing system: Latin

Language codes
- ISO 639-3: ark
- Glottolog: arik1265
- ELP: Arikapú
- Arikapú is classified as Critically Endangered by the UNESCO Atlas of the World's Languages in Danger.

Arikapú (also historically called Mashubi) is an endangered Yabutian language, historically spoken by the Arikapú people in the upper reaches of the Amazon basin. The language is moribund, with only two living speakers, and no one actively learning the language. A bilingual Arikapú-Portuguese dictionary with approximately 1350 words has been compiled, along with a Latin script writing system for the language.

== Speakers ==
As of 2018, only two people still speak Arikapú. The language was more widely spoken by the Arikapú people, who lived in the Brazilian state of Rondônia, along the upper reaches of the Rio Branco, a tributary of the Guaporé River. Beginning in the early 20th century, Brazilian colonization displaced the Arikapú people, with many of them moving downstream to work in rubber plantations.

The number of Arikapú speakers has been dropping over time. Prior to colonization, there were likely thousands of speakers. A 2007 study estimated less than 50 people still spoke Arikapú, and by 2015, the number of speakers was down to two. By 2018, the two known speakers were living in different Indigenous Territories, with no one in the younger generations learning the language. Ethnic Arikapú people living in the Indigenous Territories now speak Tuparí, Makuráp, or Portuguese, and share aspects of their culture with the other peoples of the local Marico cultural complex.

== Classification ==
Arikapú is closely related to the nearby Djeoromitxí language, and the two languages are grouped together as the Yabutian (or Jabutí) languages. Though originally thought to be unrelated to other indigenous languages, they are likely a branch of the Macro-Jê language family. The linguistic differences between Arikapú and Djeoromitxí suggest that their speakers separated around 2,000 years ago, after moving from the east (where the other Macro-Jê languages are spoken). The Yabutian languages are the westernmost members of the Macro-Jê family.

Historically, there have been some reports of a third language related to Arikapú, called Mashubi or Maxubí. These include a 1914 wordlist by explorer Percy Fawcett, the earliest known documentation of any Jabutían language, and Čestmír Loukotka's 1968 classification of South American languages. However, follow-up research suggests that this was an erroneous label; indigenous groups had never heard of Mashubi and the wordlist largely overlapped with Arikapú. As a result, it is now believed that Mashubi is not a separate language but an alternative name for Arikapú.

== Phonology ==
=== Consonants ===
Arikapú has eleven consonantal phonemes:

		Bilabial	Alveolar	Palatal	Velar	Glottal
Occlusive	voiceless	p ⟨p⟩	t ⟨t⟩	tʃ ⟨tx⟩	k ⟨k⟩	(ʔ) ⟨'⟩
Occlusive	voiced	m ⟨m, b⟩	n ⟨n, d, dj⟩			
Continuant			ɾ ⟨r⟩	j ⟨y⟩	w ⟨w⟩	h ⟨h⟩

- The nasals /m, n/ have prenasalized [ᵐb, ⁿd, ⁿdʒ] and oral [b, d, dʒ] plosive and affricate allophones, which are reflected in the orthography.
- The glottal stop is likely not a phoneme of its own but a phonological insertion between vowels to give a consonantal onset to an otherwise onsetless syllable.}}

=== Vowels ===
Arikapú has fourteen vowels, with distinctions in vowel quality (height, backness) and nasality. Eight are oral vowels, and six of them are nasalized versions of the oral vowels:

	Front		Central		Back	
	oral	nasal	oral	nasal	oral	nasal
Close	i ⟨i⟩	ĩ ⟨ĩ⟩	ɨ ⟨ü⟩		u ⟨u⟩	ũ ⟨ũ⟩
Near-close	ɪ ⟨ï⟩					
Mid			ə ⟨ä⟩	ə̃ ⟨ä̃⟩		
Open-mid	ɛ ⟨e⟩	ɛ̃ ⟨ẽ⟩			ɔ ⟨o⟩	ɔ̃ ⟨õ⟩
Open			a ⟨a⟩	ã ⟨ã⟩		

Minimal pairs exist between oral and nasal vowels. For instance, [nĩkrã] means 'wrist', while [nĩkra] means 'chair'. However, there is some variation in nasalization, and nasalization may spread to the left. Diphthongs also exist in Arikapú, and may contrast with two consecutive monophthongs, as in [kaj] 'head' versus [ka.i] 'hair'. Vowels may also become diphthongized in stressed syllables, with a [j] off-glide.

== Writing system ==
The Arikapú language is written using the same orthography as its sister language, Djeoromitxí. It is based on applying the International Phonetic Alphabet to Arikapú's phonological system, with a few changes. The vowels /ə, ɛ, ɪ, ɔ, ɨ/ are written as ⟨ä, e, ï, o, ü⟩, respectively. Nasalisation is indicated by a tilde on the vowel: ⟨ã ä̃ ẽ ĩ õ ũ⟩. The consonants /ʔ/ and /t͡ʃ/ are written as ⟨'⟩ and ⟨tx⟩. The writing system also writes out the predictable allophones as separate letters to reflect their actual pronunciation: underlying /m/ is written as ⟨m⟩ or ⟨b⟩, and underlying /n/ is written as ⟨n⟩, ⟨nd⟩, or ⟨ndj⟩ depending on context.

For alphabetization, the nasal marker ⟨˜⟩ is ignored, so ⟨a⟩ and ⟨ã⟩ are grouped together. The vowels with the ⟨¨⟩ diacritic are treated as separate letters, and are alphabetized immediately after their bare equivalents. The resulting alphabet has the following characters, in this order:

Arikapú alphabet
a/ã	ä/ä̃	b	d	dj	e/ẽ	h	i/ĩ	ï	k	'	m	n	o/õ	p	r	t	tx	u/ũ	ü	y	w

== Morphosyntax ==
Arikapú is an isolating language, with a small set of obligatory personal prefixes. The functions of case marking are handled by postpositional modifiers/clitics that mark the semantic role of the arguments, with an ergative marking structure. It has mostly free word order, with a tendency toward postnominal modifiers (Noun-Modifier order) and objects preceding the verb (SOV or OVS orders).
