= Guarú language =

Extinct Arawakan language

Guarú
- Garú
- Native to: Colombia
- Region: Miritiparaná River
- Ethnicity: Guarú
- Extinct: after 1937, with the death of Amanumá
- Language family: Arawakan: Northern; Upper Amazon; Western Nawiki; Yucuna; Guarú

Language codes
- ISO 639-3: –
- Glottolog: guar1294
- Linguasphere: 82-AFG-ba

Guarú (Garú) is an extinct Arawakan language, considered a dialect of Yucuna, formerly spoken on the Miritiparaná River in Colombia.

== History ==
=== Documentation ===
The only known vocabulary of Guaru was collected by Father Bartolomé de Igualada in 1937 and received by French linguist Paul Rivet. Igualada had collected the wordlist from a 68-year-old man named Amanumá, whose father was Guaru and mother was Yucuna, and who was the last of the Guaru to speak their language. Amanumá could not speak Spanish and so Igualada had to make use of a Yucuna and a Matapí interpreter. The Yucuna reported that the group of Guaru numbered 15 men, five women, and an unknown number of children. Čestmír Loukotka (1968) reported that the language was still spoken in 1964. Henri Ramirez (2001) suggested that the Guaru were the same group as the Hurumi or Imíkee, as they were called by the Yucuna.

== Geographical distribution ==
Amanumá was encountered during a voyage on the Miritiparaná River by Igualada. He reported that the Guaru had originally lived between the Yari and Cahuinari Rivers, at the sources of the Mamurá and Cuana tributaries of the Netá River, which in turn empties into the Caquetá River. In this region, the Guaru then went to the upper Miriti River. Loukotka (1968) further reports that the language was also spoken on the Meta River.

== Classification ==
Guaru is classified as a dialect of Yucuna by Rivet, Ramirez (2001), and the online language database Glottolog. Yucuna is, in turn, classified within the Japurá-Colômbia subgroup of Arawakan by Ramirez.

== Vocabulary ==
Guarú vocabulary
gloss	Guarú
banana	xaːarú
many	makeixe-neča
good(ness)	puːpoača
path	ñieñiepu
hair	xiči
stars	ibiri
woman	nulakeyeguay
good woman	puːpñana-čima
man	ačiña
good man	puːpoačiña
bad man	imayaua-čima
he	iča-leé
they	mape-čima
I	nu-ča
hand	yatela-čima
hands	yamačela
to eat	peña-kape-eno
we two eat	xiyama guag-neča-pena ma-ama
of mine	nuu-dexe
ours	na-lexe ačačina
we	ne-ča
foot	numa
feet	vaːmagñuma
his, yours	pi-lexe ača
sun	kaamu
you (sg.)	pi-te-ča
you (pl.)	iča-maneba
one	paglua-čima
two	xeyama
three	uzíkele
four	pako-keit

The personal pronouns evidently contain errors.
