= Jaicós =

Coordinates: 7°21′S 41°08′W

- Municipality
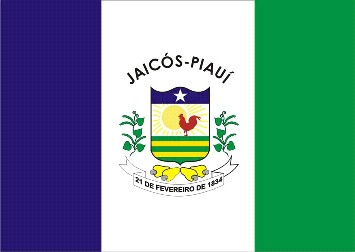
- Flag

- Country: Brazil
- Region: Nordeste
- State: Piauí
- Mesoregion: Sudeste Piauiense

Population (2020)
  - Total: 19,170
- Time zone: UTC−3 (BRT)

Jaicós is a municipality in the state of Piauí in the Northeast region of Brazil.

It was named after the Jaikó people who used to occupy the area.

== See also ==
- List of municipalities in Piauí
