= Yucuna language =

Arawakan language of Colombia

Yucuna
- Jukuna
- Native to: Colombia
- Region: Miritiparaná River
- Native speakers: (1,800 cited 2001)
- Language family: Arawakan: Northern; Upper Amazon; Western Nawiki; Yucuna
- Dialects: Guarú † ?

Language codes
- ISO 639-3: ycn
- Glottolog: yucu1253 Yucuna
- ELP: Yucuna
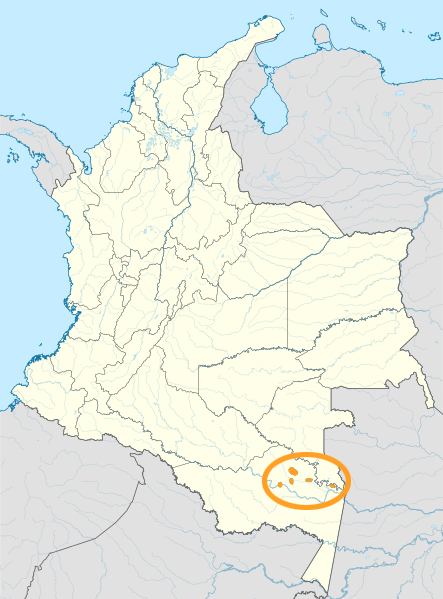

Yucuna (Jukuna), also known as Matapi, Yucuna-Matapi, and Yukunais, is an Arawakan language spoken in several communities along the Mirití-Paraná River in Colombia. Extinct Guarú (Garú) was either a dialect or a closely related language. Yucuna is a polysynthetic language, and it uses SVO word order.

The Matapi, a Tucanoan people, lived at the headwaters of the Popeyacá and Yapiyá, tributaries to the Miriti River and Apaporis River but most may have been sold as slaves or moved to Brazil. The remainder joined the Yucuna.

== Phonology ==
The Yucuna phoneme inventory consists of 16 consonants and 5 vowels.

Vowels
	Front	Central	Back
Close	i		u
Mid	e		o
Open		a	

Consonants
		Bilabial	Alveolar	Palatal	Velar	Glottal
Nasal		m	n	ɲ ⟨ñ⟩	(ŋ) (Note: /ŋ/ occurs as an allophone of /n/ before /k/.)	
Plosive	unaspirated	p	t	t͡ʃ ⟨ch⟩	k ⟨c/qu⟩ (Note: /k/ can be written ⟨qu⟩ before front vowels, and ⟨c⟩ otherwise.)	ʔ ⟨'⟩
Plosive	aspirated	pʰ ⟨ph⟩	tʰ ⟨th⟩			
Fricative			s			h ⟨j⟩
Approximant		w ⟨hu⟩	l	j ⟨y⟩		
Tap			ɾ ⟨r⟩			

== See also ==
- Cariban languages

== Notes and references ==
=== Bibliography ===
- Arias, Leonardo; Emlen, Nicholas Q.; Norder, Sietze; Julmi, Nora; Lemus Serrano, Magdalena; Chacon, Thiago; Wiegertjes, Jurriaan; Howard, Austin; Azevedo, Matheus C. B. C.; Caine, Allison; Dunn, Saskia; Stoneking, Mark; Van Gijn, Rik (2022). "Interpreting mismatches between linguistic and genetic patterns among speakers of Tanimuka (Eastern Tukanoan) and Yukuna (Arawakan)" (PDF). Interface Focus. 13 (20220056). doi:10.1098/rsfs.2022.0056. PMC 9732642. PMID 36655193. S2CID 254409212.
- Lemus Serrano, Magdalena (2020). Pervasive nominalization in Yukuna, an Arawak language of Colombian Amazonia (PDF) (PhD thesis). Université Lumière Lyon 2.
