= Kamakã language =

Extinct Macro-Je language of Brazil

Kamakã
- Ezeshio
- Native to: Brazil
- Region: Bahia
- Ethnicity: Kamakã people
- Extinct: by 1950s
- Language family: Macro-Jê: Kamakã; Kamakã
- Dialects: Kamakã; Kotoxó; Mongoyó

Language codes
- ISO 639-3: vkm
- Glottolog: kama1372
- Linguasphere: 89-GAA-aa

The Kamakã language (Kamakan), or Ezeshio, is an extinct language of a small family, belonging to the Macro-Jê languages of Brazil. Kotoxó and Mongoyó/Mangaló are sometimes included as dialects.

== Classification ==
Kamakã is a Macro-Jê language. It was spoken by several groups of indigenous peoples who lived in Bahia, including the Kamakã, Mongoyó, Menién, Kotoxó and Masakará.

== History ==
The Kamakã people are now completely integrated into the Pataxó-hã-hã-hãe people.

== Phonology ==
Grahl (2009) proposes the following phonology for Kamakã. Nikulin (2020) believes that he "does not exercise due caution", thereby "incurring evident errors".

Vowels
	Oral			Nasal		
	Front	Central	Back	Front	Central	Back
High	i	ɨ	u	ĩ	(ɨ̃)	(ũ)
Mid	e	ə	o	(ẽ)		(õ)
Low	ɛ	a	ɔ		ã	

- /ə/ can also be realized as [ʌ].
- Nasal vowels in parentheses are taken from the Krenak vowel system for symmetry.

Consonants
	Labial	Alveolar	Palatal	Velar	Glottal
Stop	p	t	tʃ	k	
Fricative	f	s	ʃ	x	h
Nasal	m	n	ɲ		
Flap		ɾ			
Glide			j	w	

- /ɾ/ can be in free variation with a fricative [ʒ] and a lateral [l].
- /n/ is heard as [ŋ] when preceding /k/.
