= Paravilhana language =

Extinct Cariban language

Paravilhana
- Paravilyana
- Native to: Brazil
- Region: Roraima
- Extinct: 1914
- Language family: Cariban: Venezuelan; Mapoyo–Tamanaku; Paravilhana–Pauxiana; Paravilhana

Language codes
- ISO 639-3: None (mis)
- Glottolog: para1309
- Linguasphere: 80-AFB-bb

Paravilhana (Paravilyana) is an extinct and poorly attested Cariban language. The last Paravilhana died in 1914.

== History ==
The last of the Paravilhana people died in 1914.

== Classification ==
Kaufman (1994, 2007) placed it in his Pawishiana branch, but his classification is outdated. More modern classifications group it in the Venezuelan Cariban branch and Mapoyo-Tamanaku subgroup, with closely related Pauxiána and Sapará.
