= Sapará language =

Extinct Cariban language

Sapará
- Zapara
- Native to: Brazil
- Region: Roraima
- Ethnicity: Sapará
- Extinct: 1965
- Language family: Cariban: Paravilyana; Sapará

Language codes
- ISO 639-3: None (mis)
- Glottolog: sapa1254
- Linguasphere: 80-AFB-aa

Sapará (Zapara) is an extinct and poorly attested Cariban language, last spoken on the Uraricoera River. Its closest relative is the extinct Paravilhana and Pauxiána languages. The last two speakers died in 1965. The Sapará were held to arise from the Arekuna and Macushi peoples. William Curtis Farabee (1924) found their language to be closely related to the Macushi language.

Robert Hermann Schomburgk described the Sapara and their language as follows:

The Zaparas have arisen from the intermarriages of Macusis and Arecunas. They inhabit principally the mountains Toupae'eng and Waikamang (latitude 3° 45′ north, longitude 61° 45′ west); but there are likewise a few settlements along the banks of the Parima. Their whole number probably amounts to only 300, and their language is the Macusi idiom with very slight and dialectic variations.
