= Jeikó language =

Extinct language of Brazil

Jaikó
- Jeicó, Geicó
- Native to: Brazil
- Region: Jaicós, southeastern Piauí
- Ethnicity: Jaikó
- Extinct: 19th century
- Language family: Macro-Jê: Jaikó

Language codes
- ISO 639-3: None (mis)
- Glottolog: geic1236

Jeikó (Jeicó, Jeikó, Yeico, Geico, Eyco, Zyeikó) is an extinct language of southeastern Piauí, Brazil, known only from a 19th-century wordlist with interference from neighboring languages. It is considered a Macro-Jê language, but not always in the Jê language branch.

== Classification ==
Based on a 67-word list from the early 19th century in von Martius (1867), it appears to be a Jê language.

Davis (1968) found a number of lexical similarities with the Jê language family. He noted, however, that "[m]ost comparable Jeikó items, however, show no similarity to reconstructed Proto Jê [sic] forms".

However, Ramirez et al. (2015) doubts the accuracy of von Martius' list, and notes that the word list may actually consist of a wide mixture of languages spoken in Piauí, including from Pimenteira (Cariban) and Masakará (Kamakã). Nevertheless, Nikulin (2020) still finds convincing evidence that Jaikó was a Macro-Jê language, but does not consider it to be within the Jê branch. At least 13 words from Martius' wordlist belong to a Macro-Jê language.

== Geographical distribution ==
Jaikó was spoken around the aldeia (village) of Cajueiro, located in what is now southeastern Piauí state. The name is derived from the town of Jaicós, which was located in the Jaikó people's territory around the Canindé River and Gurgueia River.

== Vocabulary ==
The full Geicó word list from von Martius (1867), with both the original Latin glosses and translated English glosses, is reproduced below.

Latin gloss (original)	English gloss (translated)	Geicó
aethiopissa	black woman	tacayo
asso, are	roast	tiloschung
audio, ire	hear	uschiegkó
auris	ear	aischeroh
avunculus	uncle	iquaté
brachium	arm	aepang
brevis, e	short	nohtutudäng
calidus, a, um	hot	ijahú
capillus	hair	grangsché
caput	head	grangblá
coelum	sky	maecó
collum	neck	aepurgó
costa	rib	aemantaelä
dens	tooth	ayanté
diabolus	devil	pocklaeschü aqälé
dies	day	tipiaco
digitus	finger	aenaenongklang
domus	house	y(l)rouró
dormio, ire	sleep	uhliong
edo, ere	eat	tiqua
femur	thigh	aecroh
filia	daughter	scharrepiú
filius	son	scharrété
foedus, a, um	treaty	nohmĕlĕniheh
folium	leaf	arandische
frigidus a, um	cold	ohntü(hl)
homo albus	white man	tipiaeung
homo niger	black man	tickah
ignis	fire	ping
juvenis	young	oopáung
lavo, are	wash	namblú
lingua	tongue	aenettá
longus, a, um	long	nohriähniheng
luna	moon	paang
macer, a, um	thin (person)	nohnpütü(hl)
mamma	breast	aejussi
manus	hand	aenaenong
mater	mother	ná
membr. vir.	man, male	aereng
membr. mul.	woman, female	aeoaénū
morior	die	nong(e)roh
nasus	nose	aenecopiöh
nox	night	coco
occido	fall	tiuing
oculus	eye	alepuh
os, oris	mouth	aingko
paler	stick	já
patera cucurbitina	gourd bowl	ae(e)rû
pectus	breast	aejussi
pes	foot	aepähno
pinguis, e	fat (adj.)	nohtŏnĭheh
puella	girl	juckqué
pulcher, a, um	beautiful	nohr(l)äniheh
ramus	branch	arandische
semiaethiops (mulatto)	mulatto	mandattú
sol	sun	chügkrá
soror	sister	nempiaepiú
stella	star	bräcklüh
sylva	forest	oütü
tabacum	tobacco	pâeih
terra	earth	chgkü
trulla	ladle	cărá
venter	belly	aepu
ventus	wind	ongkthü
video, ere	see	u(l)epú
umbilicus	navel	aequakrüng
unguis	fingernail	aenaenongsiaé
