= Kamakã languages =

Small family of extinct Macro-Jê languages of Bahía near Brazil's Atlantic coast

Kamakã
- Kamakanan
- Geographic distribution: Bahía, Brazil
- Linguistic classification: Macro-Jê: Kamakã
- Subdivisions: Masakará †; Kamakã–Kotoxó–Manyã †

Language codes
- Glottolog: kama1371
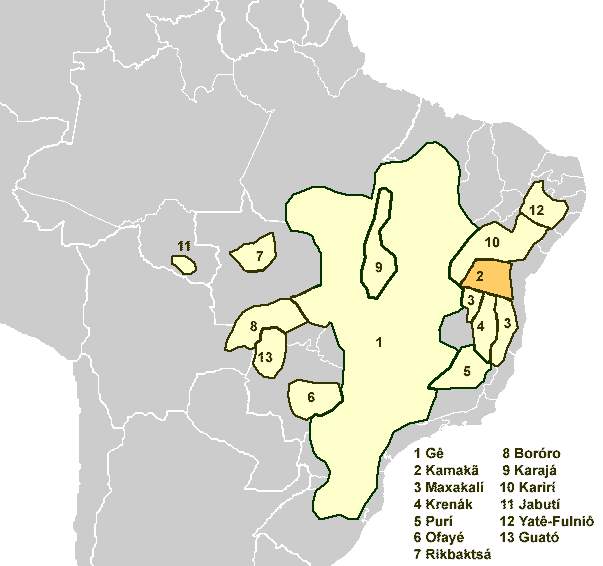
- Map of Kamakã languages

The Kamakã languages are a small family of extinct Macro-Jê languages of Bahía, northeastern Brazil, composed of Kamakã, Kotoxó-Mongoyó, Menién, and Masakará.

== Classification ==
Internal classification of the Kamakã languages:

Kamakã

- Masakará
- (core branch)
  - Kamakã
  - Menien
  - Kotoxó, Mongoyó

Masakará is the most divergent language.

=== Mason (1950) ===
Camacán (Kamakán) varieties listed by Mason (1950):

- Camacán (Kamakán)
  - Mongoyó
  - Monshocó (Ezeshio)
- Cutashó (Kotoxó)
  - Catethoy (Katathoy)
- Menián (Manyá)
- Masacará

== Proto-language ==
Proto-Kamakã
- Reconstruction of: Kamakã languages
- Reconstructed ancestors: Proto-Macro-Jê: Proto-Trans–São Francisco

Proto-Kamakã reconstructions by Martins (2007):

Portuguese gloss (original)	English gloss (translated)	Proto-Kamakã
água	water	*tsã
andar	to walk	*mã
anta	tapir	*here
arara	macaw	*tʃoke
arco	bow	*kwã
árvore	tree	*hi
banana	banana	*tako
beber	to drink	*ka
beber (água)	to drink (water)	*tsã-ka
belo	beautiful	*tʃoho
boca	mouth	*eriko
branco	white	*kVhVro
cabeça	head	*hero
cabelo	hair	*ke
carne	meat	*kohoaja
casa	house	*toa
chuva	rain	*tsã
comer	to eat	*jukwa
dente	tooth	*tʃo
dormir	to sleep	*hondõ
esp. de banana	banana sp.	*tako
estrela	star	*pio
faca	knife	*ketʃa, *ketja
feijão	bean	*kinja
filha	daughter	*kiaxrará
filha, filho	daughter, son	*krani
filho	son	*ketje
flecha	arrow	*hwaj, *waj
fogo	fire	*tʃakɨ, *tjakɨ
irmã	sister	*tʃakarata, *jak(a)ratã
lua	moon	*hetʃe, *hedje
macaco	monkey	*kaũ
machado	axe	*kedo
madeira	wood	*hi)-ta
mandioca	manioc	*kajɨ
mão	hand	*ker
menino	boy	*kwanĩ
milho	maize	*ketʃo
milho	maize	*ketjo
muito	very	*hie-hie
nariz	nose	*niniko
olho	eye	*keto
onça (Felis onça)	jaguar (Felis)	*jake
orelha	ear	*nikoka
pai	father	*kehentã
papagaio	parrot	*karaj
pássaro	bird	*tʃano
pequeno	small	*(V)ta
preto, negro	black	*kwahda, *kwaxda
quati	coati	*pitako
