= Djeoromitxí language =

Endangered Yabutian language of Brazil

Djeoromitxi
- Jabuti
- Djeoromitxi
- Native to: Brazil
- Region: Rondônia, at the headwaters of the Rio Branco
- Ethnicity: 170 Djeoromitxí (2012)
- Native speakers: 40 (2007)
- Language family: Macro-Gê: Yabutian; Djeoromitxi

Language codes
- ISO 639-3: jbt
- Glottolog: djeo1235
- ELP: Jabutí
- Djeoromitxi is classified as Severely Endangered by the UNESCO Atlas of the World's Languages in Danger.

Djeoromitxi or Jabutí (Yabuti) is an endangered Yabutian language that is spoken by only about fifty people (though including some children) in Rondônia, Brazil, at the headwaters of the Rio Branco.

== Phonology ==
There is no tonal system in Djeoromitxí and accent is not contrastive. Morphophonological processes are rare. Syllable structure follows a (C)V pattern.

=== Consonants ===
The table below shows the consonant phonemes of Djeoromitxí.

		Labial	Coronal	Velar	Glottal
Nasal		m	n		
Plosive	voiceless	p	t	k	
Plosive	voiced	(b)	(d)		
Affricate	voiceless	ps	tʃ		
Affricate	voiced	bz	dʒ		
Continuant		w	ɾ		h

- /ps bz/ are cross-linguistically rare heterorganic affricates; they only occur before /i/, but are not in complementary distribution with other labial phonemes.
- Although Pires (1992) considers /b d/ to be distinct phonemes, Ribeiro and van der Voort (2010) consider them to be allophones of /m n/ before oral vowels.
- /n/ is realized as [ɲ] after /ĩ/.
- /p/ is realized as [ɸ] or [pɸ] before rounded vowels /ʉ u ɔ/.
- /k/ is realized as [q] before /ʉ/ and is often aspirated [kʰ] before /ə u/.
- /h/ is subject to morphophonological alternation: after a personal prefix, or as the second element of a compound, word-initial /h/ is replaced by /r/. A similar alternation is observed from /h/ to /n/ in certain roots.

=== Vowels ===
The table below shows the vowel phonemes of Djeoromitxí.

	Front		Central		Back	
	oral	nasal	oral	nasal	oral	nasal
Close	i	ĩ	ʉ		u	
Mid	ɛ	ɛ̃	ə		ɔ	ɔ̃
Open			a	ã		

- /ɛ ɔ/ are open-mid while /ə/ is close-mid.
- /ʉ/ is often realized as [ø].
- /ɔ̃/ is realized as [ɔ̃ ~ ũ] in free variation after /h/.

== Grammar ==
Djeoromitxí has nouns, verbs, adverbs and particles, with adjectives treated as intransitive verbs. Its syntax is noun-modifier and SOV or OVS in order.

The following examples demonstrate noun-modifier and SOV word order.

paku nõtʃi Ø- hukʉkʉ
woman old 3- leave
'The old woman left'

adʒɛ na ri kuka õ
you 3 DAT fruit give
'You give the fruit to him'

=== Pronouns and person markers ===
The following table shows Djeoromitxí pronominal forms.

	Pronoun	Possessive/Preposition	Intransitive subject	Transitive subject	Transitive object
1st person singular	hʉ	—	—	hʉ	—
2nd person	adʒɛ	a-	a-	adʒɛ	a-/adʒɛ
3rd person	na	i-/N	i-/na/N	na/N	i-/N
1st person plural	hirʉ	hi-	hi-	hirʉ	hi-
Impersonal	—	hi-	—	—	i-/ɛ-

The use of the forms is illustrated in the following examples:

hʉ hamə
I tired
'I'm tired'

adʒɛ a- ramə
you 2- tired
'You're tired'

nikʉ
field
'my planted field (with maize)'

i- rawa
3- flower
'(its) flower'

hʉ a- tʉmi adʒɛ
I 2- beat you
'I'm going to beat you'

hʉ i- tɛ a- ri i- ũ adʒɛ
I 3- bring 2- DAT 3- give you
'I brought it to give to you'

== Bibliography ==
- Pires, Nádia N. (1992). Estudo da gramática da língua Jeoromitxi (Jabuti) (PDF) (MA thesis). Universidade Estadual de Campinas.
- Ribeiro, Eduardo Rivail; van der Voort, Hein (October 2010). "Nimuendajú was right: The inclusion of the jabutí language family in the Macro-Jê stock". International Journal of American Linguistics. 76 (4): 517–570. doi:10.1086/658056. hdl:2066/86080. ISSN 0020-7071.
