= Pauxiána language =

Possibly extinct Cariban language

Pauxiána
- Pawishiana
- Native to: Brazil
- Region: Roraima
- Extinct: after 1944?
- Language family: Cariban: Venezuelan; Mapoyo–Tamanaku; Paravilhana–Pauixiána; Pauxiána

Language codes
- ISO 639-3: None (mis)
- Glottolog: paux1236
- Linguasphere: 80-AFB-ba

Pauixiana (Pawishiana) is a possibly extinct Cariban language formerly spoken on the Catrimani River in the Brazilian state of Roraima, closely related to Paravilhana.

== Vocabulary ==
The following vocabulary is taken from a 1932 article on the Ỹaroamë people with an accompanying wordlist for Pauxiána.

Pauxiána vocabulary
Gloss	Pauxiána
water	tuná
fire	uató
earth	oró
sun	uai
moon	núna
star	tauā́nă
man	yungvei
people	ukomó
woman	uēli
child	urémungú
