= Menién language =

Extinct language of Brazil

Menién
- Native to: Brazil
- Region: Bahia
- Extinct: after 1816
- Language family: Macro-Jê: Kamakã languages; Menién

Language codes
- ISO 639-3: None (mis)
- Glottolog: meni1247

Menién is an extinct language related to Kamakã. It is one of the Macro-Jê languages of Brazil.

== Distribution ==
It was spoken at the sources of the Jequitinhonha River.
