= Kotoxó language =

Extinct Macro-Jê language of Brazil

Kotoxó
- Kutasho
- Native to: Brazil
- Region: Bahia
- Ethnicity: Kotoxó
- Era: attested c. 1810s
- Language family: Macro-Jê: Kamakã languages; Kotoxó

Language codes
- ISO 639-3: None (mis)
- Glottolog: coto1237

Kotoxó (Cotoxo, Kotosho; also Kutasho) is an extinct language closely related to Kamakã. It was one of the Macro-Jê languages spoken in Bahia, Brazil.

== Geographical distribution ==
It was once spoken in an area roughly between the Pardo River and De Contas River.
