= Krenak language =

Endangered Macro-Gê language of the Botocudo people of Brazil

Krenak
- Botocudo
- Borum
- Native to: Brazil
- Region: Minas Gerais
- Ethnicity: 150 Krenak (2012)
- Native speakers: 10? (2006)
- Language family: Macro-Gê: Trans–São Francisco; Krenak
- Dialects: Nakrehé; Uti Krag (Nakpie)

Language codes
- ISO 639-3: kqq
- Glottolog: kren1239
- ELP: Krenak
- Linguasphere: 89-JAA-aa
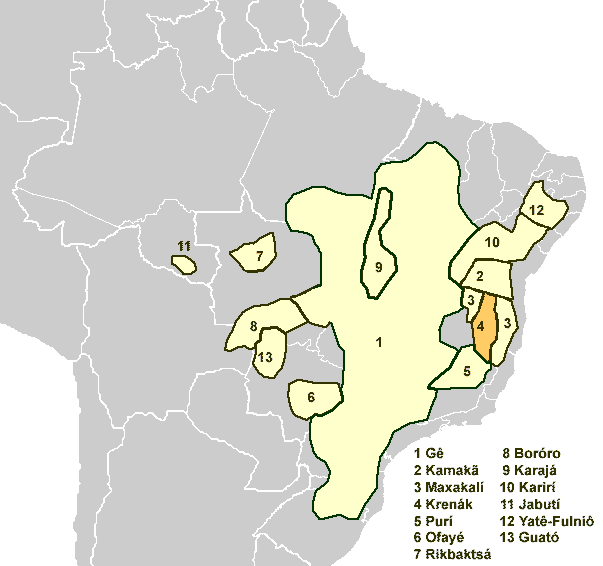

- Krenak is classified as Critically Endangered by the UNESCO Atlas of the World's Languages in Danger.

The Krenak language, also Borum or Botocudo, is an Indigenous language of Brazil classified as an independent branch of the Macro-Gê languages. It was once spoken by the Krenak people in Minas Gerais, but is known primarily by older women today.

== History ==
=== Documentation ===
A significant source of documentation on Krenak is a 3,000-word dictionary published in 1909 by Bruno Rudolph. No complete grammar exists for Krenak; it is one of the most poorly documented Indigenous languages of Brazil.

== Status ==
Presently, Portuguese is the native language for almost all Krenak, and the language is spoken exclusively by elders. However, the Krenak are very active in language revitalization.

== Geographical distribution ==
The Krenak originate from the Doce River valley, although they have had a significant presence in the Vanuíre Indigenous Territory in the municipality of Arco-Íris in São Paulo since the mid-1940s. According to the Ethnologue, Krenak is spoken between Conselheiro Pena and Resplendor in the state of Minas Gerais, as well as in a small enclave along the east bank of the Doce in São Paulo.

== Phonology ==
The following data is sourced from Pessoa (2012).

=== Vowels ===
Krenak has 12 vowel phonemes:

	Front		Central		Back	
	oral	nasal	oral	nasal	oral	nasal
Close	i	ĩ	ɨ		u	ũ
Mid	ɛ	ɛ̃	ə		ɔ	ɔ̃
Open			a	ɜ̃		

- /ə/ is close-mid while /ɛ ɛ̃ ɔ ɔ̃/ are open-mid.
- /ɜ̃/ is phonetically open-mid, but phonologically it is equivalent to /ã/ in Krenak.

=== Consonants ===
Krenak has 22 consonant phonemes:

		Bilabial	Alveolar	Palatal (-alveolar)	Velar	Glottal
Nasal	voiceless	m̥	n̥	ɲ̊	ŋ̊	
Nasal	voiced	m	n	ɲ	ŋ	
Plosive/ Affricate	voiceless	p	t	t͡ʃ	k	ʔ
Plosive/ Affricate	voiced	b	d	d͡ʒ	g	
Fricative				ʒ		h
Liquid		w	ɾ	j		

- /h/ may be realized as [x] in onset position, e.g. [ˌxataˈɾaᵈn ~ ˌhataˈɾaᵈn] 'macaw'.

Contour segments are frequently observed in Krenak:

- post-oralized nasals [mᵇ nᵈ ɲ𐞊 ŋᶢ] occur in onset position next to oral vowels. The complex onsets [mᵇɾ ŋᶢɾ] are observed.
- pre-oralized nasals [ᵇm ᵈn ᶢŋ] occur in coda position and alternate with [m n ŋ]; the latter realization results in allophonic vowel nasalization, e.g. [ˌxataˈɾaᵈn ~ ˌxataˈɾãn].

== Vocabulary ==
Several lexical loans from one of the Língua Geral varieties have been found identified. Examples include tuŋ ‘flea’ and krai ‘non-Indigenous person, foreigner’.

== Bibliography ==
- Crevels, Mily (2012-01-13). "Language endangerment in South America: The clock is ticking". In Campbell, Lyle; Grondona, Verónica (eds.). The Indigenous Languages of South America. DE GRUYTER. pp. 167–234. doi:10.1515/9783110258035.167. ISBN 978-3-11-025513-3.
- Eberhard, David M.; Simons, Gary F.; Fennig, Charles D., eds. (2026). "Krenak". Ethnologue: Languages of the World (29th ed.). Dallas: SIL International.
- Frassetto, Pedro Ternes (2018). Recuperação lexical Krenak (PDF) (Thesis) (in Brazilian Portuguese).
- Moore, D. (2006). "Brazil: Language Situation" (PDF). Encyclopedia of Language & Linguistics. Elsevier. pp. 117–128. doi:10.1016/B0-08-044854-2/01855-1. ISBN 978-0-08-044854-1.
- Pessoa, Katia Nepomuceno (2012-01-06). Análise fonética e fonológica da língua Krenak e abordagem preliminar de contos Botocudo (Doutor em Linguística thesis) (in Brazilian Portuguese). Campinas, SP: Universidade Estadual de Campinas. doi:10.47749/t/unicamp.2012.845777. hdl:20.500.12733/1617066.
- Nikulin, Andrey; da Silva, Mário André Coelho (2020). "As línguas Maxakalí e Krenák dentro do tronco Macro-Jê". Cadernos de Etnolingüística. 8 (1): 1–64.
- Rivet, Paul (1910). "Bruno -Rudolph. Wörterbuch der Botokudensprache (Vocabulaire de la langue botokudo)". Journal de la société des américanistes. 7 (1). Société des Américanistes: 316–316.
- Seki, Lucy (1987). "Apontamentos Para a Bibliografia Da Língua Botocudo/Borum". Revista de Antropologia. 30/32. Revista de Antropologia: 511–535. ISSN 0034-7701.
