= Masakará language =

Extinct Macro-Jê language of Brazil

Masakará
- Native to: Brazil
- Region: Bahia
- Extinct: (date missing)
- Language family: Macro-Jê: Kamakã; Masakará

Language codes
- ISO 639-3: None (mis)
- Glottolog: masa1311

Masakará is an extinct language related to Kamakã. It is one of the Macro-Jê languages of Brazil. It was once spoken south of the city of Juazeiro and at the old mission of Saco dos Morcegos (present-day Mirandela, Banzaê, near Ribeira do Pombal, Bahia State).

The district of Massacará in Euclides da Cunha, Bahia is named after the tribe.

Martins (2007) classifies Masakará as the most divergent of the Kamakã languages.
