= Macro-Jê languages =

Proposed language family in Brazil

Macro-Jê
- Macro-Gê
- Geographic distribution: Non-coastal parts of Brazil (except in Amazonas, Roraima, Amapá, Acre and Rio de Janeiro), Misiones (Argentina), parts of Paraguay and Bolivia
- Linguistic classification: One of the world's primary language families (Jê–Tupi–Carib?)
- Subdivisions: Jê; Trans–São Francisco; Maxakalían Borum (Krenák) Kamakã †: Jabutian–Rikbaktsa–Ofayé; Karajá; Jaikó †; ?Chiquitano

Language codes
- Glottolog: nucl1710 Nuclear–Macro–Je
- All languages and language families hypothesized to be a member of Macro-Jê

Macro-Jê (also spelled Macro-Gê) is a medium-sized language family in South America, mostly in Brazil but also in the Chiquitanía region in Santa Cruz, Bolivia. It is centered on the Jê language family, with most other branches currently being single languages due to extinctions.

== Families ==
The Macro-Jê family was first proposed in 1926, and has undergone moderate modifications since then.

Eduardo Ribeiro of the University of Chicago finds no evidence to classify Fulniô (Yatê) and Guató as Macro-Jê, pace Kaufman, nor Otí, pace Greenberg. Ribeiro does include Chiquitano, pace Rodrigues.

Glottolog accepts a 'Nuclear Macro-Je' consisting of Jean, Karaja, Krenak-Maxakalian, Ofaie, Rikbaktsa, and Yabutian (Jabuti), with extinct Jeicó unclassified within the family. Lexical parallels with Kamakanan and Purian have yet to be corroborated with reconstructions; the similarities with Purian disappear once Coropo is reclassified as Maxakalian. It notes suggestive grammatical similarities with Bororoan, Kariri, and Chiquitano, of the kind also shared with Tupian and Cariban, but little lexical evidence.

These languages share irregular morphology with the Tupi and Carib families, and Rodrigues (2000) and Ribeiro connect them all as a Je–Tupi–Carib family.

Pache (2018) suggests a distant genetic relationship between Macro-Jê and Chibchan.

=== Nikulin (2020) ===
Nikulin (2020) proposes the following internal classification of Macro-Jê:

- Macro-Jê
  - Karajá
  - Western
    - Mato Grosso
      - Ofayé
      - Rikbáktsa
    - Jabutí
      - Arikapú
      - Djeoromitxí
  - Eastern
    - ? Jaikó
    - Jê (see)
      - Akuwẽ; Northern Jê, Panará
      - Ingain; Southern Jê
    - Trans–São Francisco
      - Borum
        - Krenák
      - Maxakalí
        - Malalí
        - Nuclear Maxakalí
          - Maxakalí
          - Ritual Maxakalí; Makoní
          - Pataxó; Pataxó-Hãhãhãe
          - Koropó
      - ? Kamakã
        - Masakará
        - Southern Kamakã
          - Menien
          - Kamakã; Kotoxó/Mongoyó

Nikulin (2020) does not accept the following languages and language families as part of Macro-Jê.

- Boróro
- Yaathê (Fulniô)
- Purí
- Guató
- Karirí
- Otí

However, Nikulin (2023) considers Chiquitano to be a Macro-Jê language.

=== Jolkesky (2016) ===
Jolkesky (2016) proposes the following internal classification of Macro-Jê:

- Macro-Jê
  - Borum (Krenak) †
  - Ofaye
  - Rikbaktsa
  - Yate
  - Bororo
    - Bororo
    - Otuke †
    - Umutina †
  - Maxakali
    - Malali †
    - Maxakali-Pataxo
      - Maxakali
      - Pataxo †
  - Kamakã †
    - Masakara †
    - Kamakã-Menien †
      - Kamakã †
      - Menien †
  - Kariri †
    - Dzubukuá †
    - Kipeá †
    - Xoko †
  - Macro-Jê, Nuclear
    - Besiro (Chiquitano)
    - Jeoromitxi-Arikapu (Yabutian): Arikapu; Jeoromitxi
    - Karaja: Javae; Karaja; Xambioa
    - Jê
      - Jê, Central
        - Akroa †
        - Xakriaba †
        - Xavante
        - Xerente
        - Jeiko †
      - Jê, Southern
        - Ingain: Ingain †; Kimda †
        - Kaingang-Xokleng
          - Kaingang: Kaingang; Kaingang Paulista
          - Xokleng
      - Jê, Northern
        - Apinaje
        - Kayapo: Mẽbengokre; Xikrin
        - Panara
        - Suya-Tapayuna: Suya; Tapayuna
        - Timbira: Apãniekra; Kraho; Krẽje †; Krĩkati; Parkateje; Pykobje; Ramkokamekra

=== Kaufman (1990) ===
Kaufman (1990) finds the proposal "probable".

- Macro-Jê
  - Nuclear Macro-Je
    - Jê (45,000 speakers)
    - Maxakali-Borum
      - Borum (Krenák, Botocudo; < 10 speakers)
      - Maxakalían (2,000 speakers)
    - Karajá (2,700 speakers)
    - Ofayé (< 12 speakers)
    - Rikbaktsá (40 speakers)
    - Yabutian [moribund]
    - ? Jeikó †
  - Borôroan (3,000 speakers)
  - Kamakã †
  - Karirí †
  - Purían †

== Proto-language ==
Proto-Macro-Jê
- Reconstruction of: Macro-Jê languages
- Lower-order reconstructions: Proto-Jabutí; Proto-Jê; Proto-Trans–São Francisco

Proto-Macro-Jê is notable for having relatively few consonants and a large vocalic inventory. There are also complex onsets with rhotics, as well as contrastive nasalization for vowels.

Phonological inventory of Proto-Macro-Jê as reconstructed by Nikulin (2020):

Proto-Macro-Jê Consonants (Nikulin)
		Bilabial		Alveolar		Palatal		Velar	
Plosive	voiceless	*p		*t		*c (Note: Possibly [tʃ~tɕ~ts~c])		*k	
Plosive	voiced	[ᵐb~m]	*m	[ⁿd~n]	*n	[ᶮɟ]	*ñ (Note: Possibly [ⁿdʒ~ⁿdʑ~ⁿdz~ᶮɟ])	[ᵑɡ~ŋ]	*ŋ
Nasal		[ᵐb~m]	*m	[ⁿd~n]	*n	[ɲ~j]	*j	[ᵑɡ~ŋ]	*ŋ
Continuant		*w		*r		[ɲ~j]	*j		

The nasal consonants *m *n *ñ *ŋ are allophonically oralized before oral vowels and the consonant *j is fully nasalized before nasal vowels.

The consonant *ñ has been only reconstructed before oral vowels, therefore it has only the oral reflex, and instead the consonant *j is realized as a palatal nasal.

Proto-Macro-Jê Vowels (Nikulin)
	Front		Central		Back	
	oral	nasal	oral	nasal	oral	nasal
Close	*i	*ĩ	*y	*ỹ	*u	*ũ
Close-mid	*ê	*ẽ	*ə̂	*ə̃	*ô	
Open-mid	*e	*ẽ	*ə	*ə̃	*o	
Open			*a *â (Note: â has an unclear realization, it is reconstructed to reflect various different vowels (*a *o *ã) in descendent languages)			

=== Syllable structure ===
The maximal syllable structure is */CrVC°/, where /°/ is an echo vowel. The complex onset clusters are limited to *pr, *mr, *kr, *ŋr and they are subject to the same allophony found on nasals.

=== Vocabulary ===
For a list of Proto-Macro-Jê reconstructions by Nikulin (2020), see the corresponding Portuguese article.

== Language contact ==
Many Macro-Jê languages have been in contact with various languages of the Tupí-Guaraní family, which resulted in lexical borrowings. For instance, Ribeiro (2012) finds a number of Apyãwa loanwords in Karajá (such as bèhyra 'carrying basket', kòmỹdawyra 'andu beans', hãrara 'macaw (sp.)', tarawè 'parakeet (sp.)', txakohi 'Txakohi ceremonial mask', hyty 'garbage (Javaé dialect)') as well as several Karajá loans in Apyãwa (tãtã 'banana', tori 'White man', marara 'turtle stew', irãwore 'Irabure ceremonial mask'), Parakanã, and Asuriní of Trocará (sata 'banana', toria 'White man'). Loans from one of the Língua Geral varieties (Língua Geral Paulista or Língua Geral Amazônica) have been found in Karajá (jykyra 'salt', mỹkawa 'firearm', brùrè 'hoe', kòmỹta 'beans', mabèra 'paper (Xambioá dialect)', ĩtajuwa 'money (dated)'), Maxakalí (ãmãnex 'priest', tãyũmak 'money', kãmãnok 'horse', tapayõg 'Black man'), Ritual Maxakalí (kõnõmĩy 'boy', kõyãg 'woman', petup 'tobacco', pakõm 'banana', tapuux 'foreigner', xetukxeka 'potato'), and Krenak (tuŋ 'flea', krai 'non-Indigenous person, foreigner'). Chiquitano has borrowed extensively from an unidentified Tupí-Guaraní variety; one example is Chiquitano takones [takoˈnɛs] 'sugarcane', borrowed from a form close to Paraguayan Guaraní takuare'ẽ 'sugarcane'.

Some Macro-Jê languages from different branches have secondarily contacted with each other, also resulting in lexical loans. Ribeiro (2012), for instance, identifies several Karajá loans in Mẽbêngôkre, especially in the dialect spoken by the Xikrin group. These loans are thought to have entered Mẽbêngôkre from the variety spoken by the Xambioá group of the Karajá people. Examples include warikoko (Kayapó dialect) or watkoko (Xikrin dialect) 'tobacco pipe', rara 'kind of basket', wiwi 'song, chant', bikwa 'relative, friend', bero 'puba flour', borrowed from Karajá werikòkò, lala, wii, bikòwa, bèrò.

Loanwords from Brazilian Portuguese are found in many, if not all, Macro-Jê languages spoken in Brazil. Examples from Maxakalí include kapex 'coffee', komenok 'blanket', kapitõg 'captain', pẽyõg 'beans', mug 'bank', tenemiyam 'TV' (borrowed from Portuguese café, cobertor, capitão, feijão, banco, televisão); in Karajá, Ribeiro (2012) documents the Portuguese loans nieru 'money' and maritò 'suit, jacket' (from dinheiro, paletó), among others.

There is a significant number of loanwords from Chiquitano or from an extinct variety close to Chiquitano in Camba Spanish, including bi 'genipa', masi 'squirrel', peni 'lizard', peta 'turtle, tortoise', jachi 'chicha leftover', jichi 'worm; jichi spirit', among many others.

Jolkesky (2016) notes that there are lexical similarities with Arawakan languages due to contact.

== See also ==
- Je–Tupi–Carib languages
- Trans–São Francisco languages
