= Abente =

Abente is a surname. Notable people with the surname include:

- Carlos Federico Abente (1914–2018), Paraguayan lyricist, poet, and surgeon
- Victorino Abente y Lago (1846–1935), Paraguayan poet
