= Baniwa of Içana =

Arawakan language spoken in South America

- Native to: Colombia, Venezuela, Brazil
- Ethnicity: Baniwa people
- Native speakers: 18,000 (2007–2012)
- Language family: Arawakan: Northern; Upper Amazon; Eastern Nawiki; Baniwa of Içana
- Dialects: Carútana-Baniwa; Hohôdene (Katapolitana); Siusy-Tapuya (Seuci); Ipeka-Tapuia; Curripaco (Wakuénai); Unhun (Katapolitana, Enhen); Waliperi; Mapanai; Moriwene

Official status
- Official language in: Brazil (Amazonas)

Language codes
- ISO 639-3: bwi
- Glottolog: bani1255
- ELP: Baniwa; Curripaco
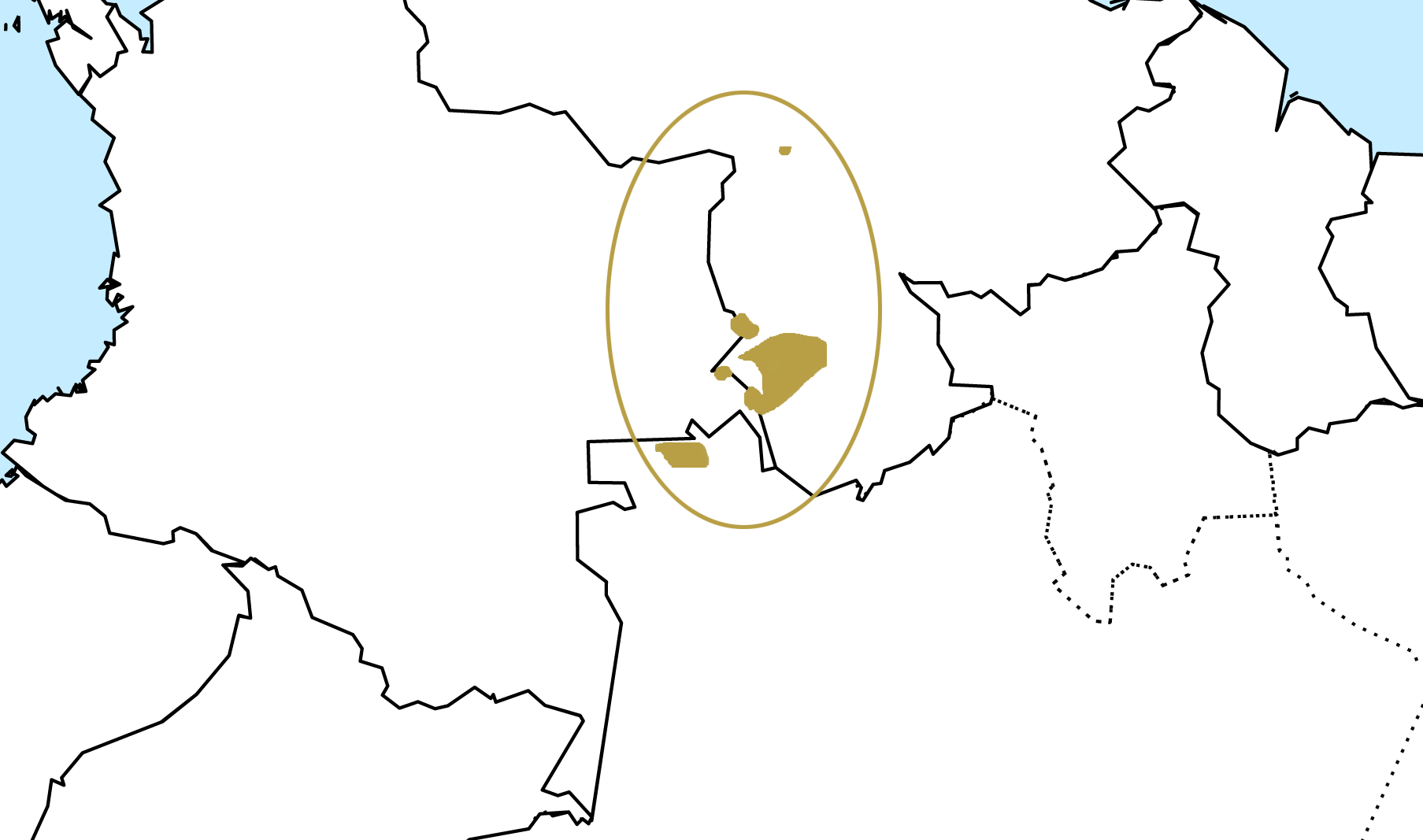

- Baníwa do Içana is classified as Vulnerable by the UNESCO Atlas of the World's Languages in Danger.

Baniwa (Baniva), or in older sources Itayaine (Iyaine), is an Arawakan language spoken in Guainía, Colombia, Venezuela, and Amazonas, Brazil. It forms a subgroup with the Tariana, Piapoco, Resígaro and Guarequena languages. There are 10,000 speakers.

== Varieties ==
Aikhenvald (1999) considers the three main varieties to be dialects; Kaufman (1994) considers them to be distinct languages, in a group he calls "Karu". They are:

- Baniwa of Içana (Baniua do Içana)
- Curripaco (Kurripako, Ipeka-Tapuia-Curripako)
- Katapolítani-Moriwene-Mapanai (Catapolitani, Kadaupuritana)

Various (sub)dialects of all three are called tapuya, a Brazilian Portuguese and Nheengatu word for non-Tupi/non-Guarani Indigenous peoples of Brazil (from a Tupi word meaning "enemy, barbarian"). All are spoken by the Baniwa people. Ruhlen lists all as "Izaneni"; Greenberg's Adzánani (= Izaneni) presumably belongs here.

Ramirez (2020) gives the following classification for three separate dialect chains:

- Southern (Karotana): lower Içana River, also a group living in Victorino on the Guainia River (Colombia-Venezuela border)
  - Mapatsi-Dákeenai (Yurupari-Tapuya)
  - Wadzoli-Dákeenai (Urubu-Tapuya)
  - Dzawi-Mínanai (Yauareté-Tapuya)
  - Adaro-Mínanai (Arara-Tapuya)
- Central (Baniwa): middle Içana River (from Assunção Mission to Siuci-Cachoeira) and its tributaries (Aiari River and lower Cuiari River); also around Tunuí
  - Hohódeeni
  - Walipere-Dákeenai (Siucí-Tapuya)
  - Máolieni (Cáuatapuya)
  - Mápanai (Ira-Tapuya)
  - Awádzoronai
  - Molíweni (Sucuriyú-Tapuya)
  - Kadáopoliri
  - etc.
- Northern (called "Koripako" in Brazil): upper Içana River (from Matapi upwards), Guainia River, headwaters of the Cuiari River. Has individual ISO 639 code.
  - Ayáneeni (Tatú-Tapuya)
  - Payoálieni (Pacútapuya)
  - Komada-Mínanai (Ipéca-Tapuya)
  - Kapitti-Mínanai (Coatí-Tapuya)
  - etc.

== Phonology ==
Vowels
	Front	Central	Back
High	ɪ iː		ʊ oː
Mid	ɛ eː		ʊ oː
Low		ə aː	

When short, the vowels /i e a o/ are realized as [ɪ ɛ ə ʊ]. Vowels are nasalized when adjacent to nasal consonants; nasal /aː/ is realized as [ɐ̃ː], while the other vowels show little change in their place of articulation when nasalized.

More precisely, stressed vowels are nasalized before simple nasal consonants, and vowels on either side of voiceless nasals are nasalized regardless of whether they are stressed.

Sequences of vowels may reduce to diphthongs and triphthongs, for example [nwajˈnidzonɪ] for /nu-aiˈnidzu-ni/. The resulting [j] behaves differently than the consonant /j/.

Consonants
		Bilabial	Dental	Alveolar	Retroflex	Palatal	Velar	Glottal
Nasal		m		n		ɲ		
Plosive	voiceless	p	t̪	t			k	
Plosive	voiced	b		d				
Affricate	voiceless			ts (Note: In Baniwa)		tʃ (Note: In Kuripako)		
Affricate	voiced			dz				
Sonorant		β		ɺ	ʐ	j	w	h

- Most sounds are found in both Baniwa and Kuripako. Kuripako apparently has both /β/ and /w/, though possibly the difference is allophonic, where Baniwa has only /w/ in those words; Baniwa has both /dz/ and /j/ where Kuripako has only /j/.
- [ŋ] occurs preceding a velar consonant.
- Lateral [ɺ] varies with median [ɾ], though the lateral allophones is preferred.

Palatalization
- Palatalization is more productive in Baniwa than in Karipako. In Baniwa, /ts/ and /dz/ are pronounced [tʃ] and [dʒ] before /i/. In Kuripako, they are pronounced [tʃ] and as the approximant [j] before all vowels.
- In both dialects, /h/ is pronounced [ç] before /i/. In Baniwa, when /h/ occurs after consonantal /j/ (but not the [j] allophone of the vowel /i/), the sequence is pronounced [ʃ]; this is [ç] in Kuripako.
Voiceless nasals
- A sequence /Nh/ (where 'N' is a nasal) may be realized as a voiceless nasal, [m̥ n̥ ɲ̥], or as a (glottal) fricative [ɸ h ç] with nasalization on adjacent vowels.
- The /h/ may be in the following syllable, as in [n̥õʷə] from /nuha/ 'I'. Other authors have analyzed these sounds differently, and there are similar processes in other Arawakan languages.
Aspirated consonants
- Similarly, a sequence /Ȼh/ (where 'Ȼ' is a plosive or affricate) is aspirated: [pʰ, t̪ʰ, tʰ, kʰ, tsʰ, tʃʰ]. The /h/ may be in the following syllable.
Other effects of /h/
- The other sonorants are similarly devoiced under the influence of /h/, for [ɺ̥ ʂ ʃ w̥] in Baniwa.
- Kuripako /β/ becomes [ɸ] and /j/ [ç].

== Grammar ==
=== Alignment system ===
Baniwa has active–stative alignment. This means that the subject of an intransitive clause is sometimes marked in the same way as the agent of a transitive clause, and sometimes marked in the same way as the patient of a transitive clause. In Baniwa alignment is realized through verbal agreement, namely prefixes and enclitics.

Prefixes are used to mark:

- Active intransitive subjects (S_{a})
- Agents of transitive clauses (A)
- Possessors
- Arguments of adpositions

Enclitics are used to mark:

- Stative intransitive subjects (S_{o})
- Patients of transitive clauses (O)

		Prefixes		Enclitics	
		singular	plural	singular	plural
1st person		nu-	wa-	-hnua	-hwa
2nd person		pi-	i-	-phia	-ihia
3rd person	Nonfeminine	ri-	na-	-ni/ -hria	-hna
3rd person	Feminine	ʒu-	na-	-ni/ -hria	-hna
Impersonal		pa-		-pha	

The differences between active and stative intransitive clauses can be illustrated below:

- Transitive: ri-kapa-ni 'He sees him/it'
- Active Intransitive: ri-emhani 'He walks'
- Stative Intransitive: hape-ka-ni 'He is cold'

=== Noun classification system ===
Baniwa has an interesting system of noun classification that combines a gender system with a noun classifier system. Baniwa has two genders: feminine and nonfeminine. Feminine gender agreement is used to refer to female referents, whilst nonfeminine gender agreement is used for all other referents. The two genders are only distinguished in third person singular. Aihkenvald (2007) considers the bipartite gender system to be inherited from Proto-Arawak.

In addition to gender, Baniwa also has 46 classifiers. Classifiers are used in three main contexts:

- As a derivational suffix on nouns, e.g.

tʃipaɾa-api
metal.object-CL.hollow
'pan'

- With numerals, e.g.

apa-api mawapi
one-CL.hollow blowgun+CL.long.thin
'one blow gun'

- With adjectives, e.g.

tʃipaɾa-api maka-api
metal.object-CL.hollow big-CL.hollow
'big pan'

Aihkenvald (2007) divides Baniwa classifiers into four different classes. One set of classifiers is used for humans, animate beings and body parts. Another set of classifiers specify the shape, consistency, quantification or specificity of the noun. Two more classes can be distinguished. One is only used with numerals and the other is only used with adjectives.

Classifiers for Humans and animate beings:

Classifier	Usage	Example
-ita	for animate males and body parts	apa-ita pedaɾia 'one old man'
-hipa	for human males only	aphepa nawiki 'one man'
-ma	for female referents	apa-ma inaʒu 'one woman'

Classifiers according to shape, consistency, quantification and specificity:

Classifier	Usage	Example
-da	round objects, natural phenomena and generic classifier	hipada 'stone'
-apa	flying animate, semioval objects	kepiʒeni 'bird'
-kwa	flat, round, extended objects	kaida 'beach'
-kha	curvilinear objects	a:pi 'snake'
-na	vertical, standing objects	haiku 'tree'
-Ø	hollow, small objects	a:ta 'cup'
-maka	stretchable, extended objects	tsaia 'skirt'
-ahna	liquids	u:ni 'water'
-ima	sides	apema nu-kapi makemaɾi 'one big side of my hand'
-pa	boxes, parcels	apa-'pa itsa maka-paɾi one big box of fishing hooks'
-wana	thin slice	apa-wana kuphe maka-wane 'a big thin slice of fish'
-wata	bundle for carrying	apa-wata paɾana maka-wate 'a big bundle of bananas'
-Ø	canoes	i:ta 'canoe'
-pawa	rivers	u:ni 'river'
-ʃa	excrement	iʃa 'excrement'
-ya	skins	dzawiya 'jaguar skin'

=== Negation ===
There are two main strategies for negation in the Kurripako-Baniwa varieties:

- Independent negative markers
- The privative derivational prefix ma-

Different varieties have different negative markers. This is so prominent that speakers identify Kurripako dialects according to the words for 'yes' and 'no'.

Dialect	Spoken in	Yes	No
Aha-Khuri	Colombia, Venezuela & Brazil	Aha	Khuri
Ehe-Khenim	Venezuela	Ehe	Khenim
Oho-Karo	Colombia & Brazil	Oho	Karo
Oho-Ñame	Colombia & Brazil	Oho	Ñame

The independent negative markers come before the verb. They are used as clausal negators in declarative and interrogative sentences. They are also used to link clauses.

The privative suffix is attached to nouns to derive a verb which means 'lacking' the noun from which it was derived. The opposite of the privative prefix is the attributive prefix ka-. This derives a verb which means 'having' the noun from which it was derived. The difference can be illustrated below:

- Noun: iipe 'meat'
- Privative: ma-iipe > meepe 'be thin' (lit. lack meat)
- Attributive: ka-iipe > keepe 'be fat' (lit. have meat)

The prefix is used in combination with the restrictive suffix -tsa to form negative imperatives, e.g. ma-ihnia-tsa 'don't eat!'. A privative prefix is also reconstructed in Proto-Arawak privative as *ma-.

=== Word order ===
Granadillo (2014) considers Kurripako a VOS language.

== Bibliography ==
de Souza, Erick Marcelo Lima (2012). Estudo Fonológico da Língua Baniwa-Kuripako [Phonological Analysis of the Baniwa-Kuripako language] (PDF) (Master's thesis) (in Brazilian Portuguese). University of Campinas. Archived (PDF) from the original on 2016-03-11.
