= Tessio =

Tessio is a surname. Notable people with the surname include:

- Aldo Tessio (1909–2000), Argentine politician
- Griselda Tessio (born 1946), Argentine politician, Vice-Governor of Santa Fe province since 2007

Fictional characters:

- Salvatore Tessio, fictional character in Mario Puzo's novel The Godfather and the film based on it

== See also ==
- Tessio (Luomo), a single by techno musician Luomo
