= Colegio del Uruguay =

Coordinates: 32.4845°S 58.2334°W

College of Uruguay
- Colegio del Uruguay
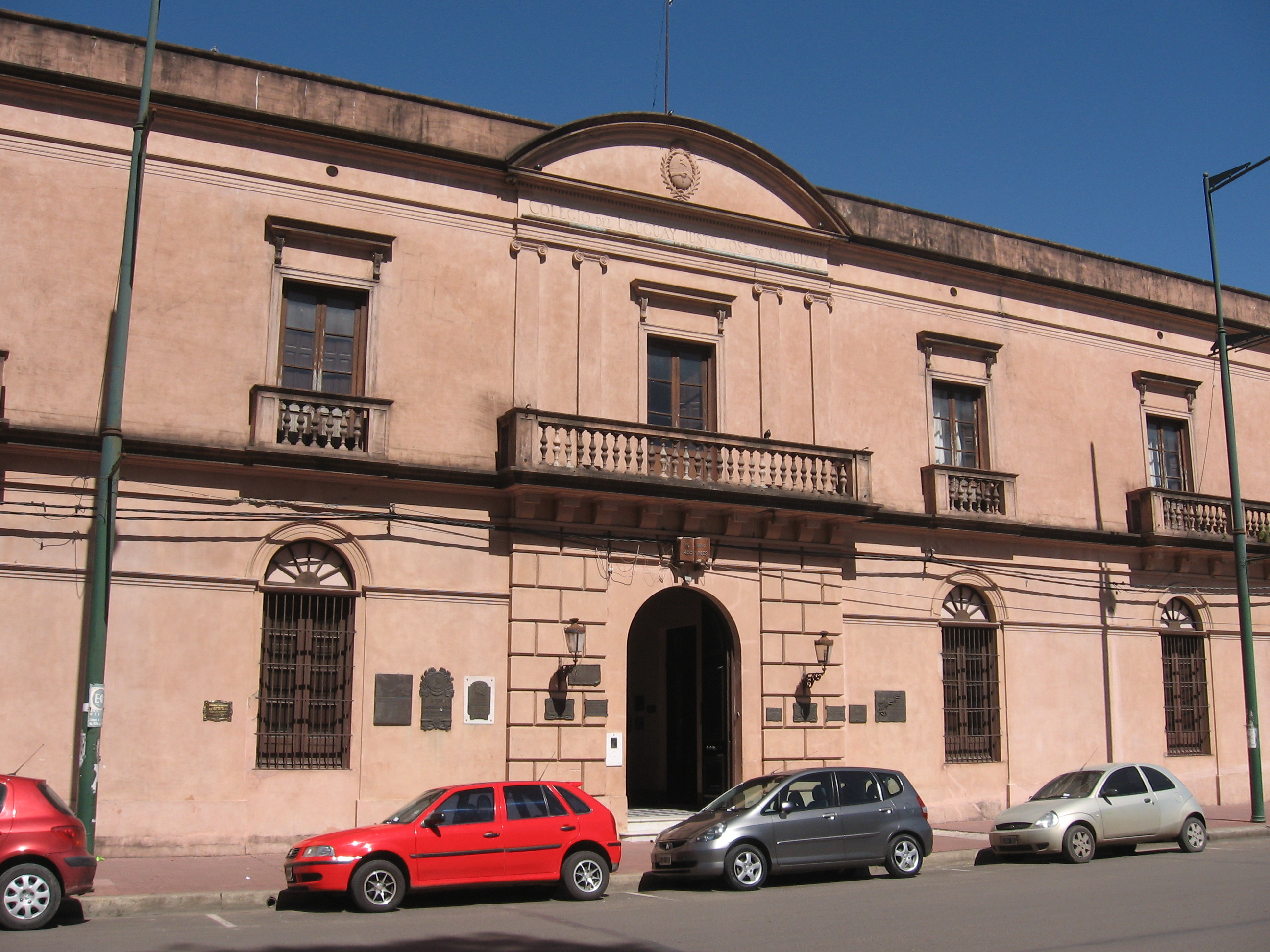

Location
- Gral. Justo José de Urquiza 25. Concepción del Uruguay, Entre Ríos

Information
- Founded: July 28, 1849; 177 years ago
- Rector: Ramon Cieri

The Colegio del Uruguay (nowadays the Colegio Superior del Uruguay "Justo José de Urquiza") is an Argentine educational institution, created by then Governor of Entre Ríos Justo José de Urquiza in the 28th of July 1849. It was the first in the country to be secular and free. Nowadays, it serves circa 1200 students.

It is located in the city of Concepción del Uruguay, in the Uruguay Department of the Entre Ríos Province. It possesses a historic building dating from 1851. The college was sacked in 1870 during Jordán's rebellion. In 1942, it was declared a national historical monument. In 1999, for its 150th anniversary, the building was rebuilt and made into a museum, the College Historical Museum. The college is set subordinate administratively to the Autonomous University of Entre Ríos.

The college was designated National Historic Monument of Argentina in 1975.

== Alumni ==
- Julio Argentino Roca, President of the Nation 1880–1886, 1898–1904;
- Victorino de la Plaza, President of the Nation 1914–1916;
- Arturo Frondizi, President of the Nation 1958–1962;
- Juan Bautista Egusquiza, President of Paraguay 1894–1898;
- Benigno Ferreira, President of Paraguay 1906–1908;
- Valentín Vergara, Governor of Buenos Aires 1926–1930;
- Santiago Baibiene, Governor of Corrientes 1869–1871;
- Felipe A. Texier, Governor of Entre Ríos 1952–1955;
- Miguel M. Nougués, Governor of Tucumán 1880–1882;
- Lucas Córdoba, Governor of Tucumán 1895–1898, 1901–1904;
- Tiburcio Benegas, Governor of Mendoza 1887–1889, 1895;
- José Benjamín de la Vega, Governor of La Rioja 1869–1871;
- Hortensio Quijano, Vice President of the Nation 1946–1952;
- Francisco Beiró, Vice President-elect of the Nation;
- Antonio Sagarna, Minister of the Supreme Court 1928–1947;
- Onésimo Leguizamón, Minister of the Supreme Court 1877–1882;
- Isaac Chavarría, Minister of Interior 1886;
- Wenceslao Pacheco, Minister of Interior 1889, Minister of the Treasury 1885–1890;
- Osvaldo Magnasco, Minister of Justice and Public Instruction 1898–1901;
- José Segundo Decoud, President of the Paraguayan Supreme Court of Justice, 1876–1878;
- Carlos Federico Abente, Paraguayan doctor and poet;
- Olegario Víctor Andrade, journalist, poet and writer;
- Eduardo Wilde, physician, politician and writer;
- Martín Coronado, journalist, poet and playwright;
- Fray Mocho, journalist and writer;
- Lucilo del Castillo, physician;
- Eleodoro Damianovich, physician and army general;
- Juan José Nágera, geologist;
- Arturo Sampay, constitutionalist for the Argentine Constitution of 1949;
- Teresa Ratto, second female doctor in Argentina;
- Domingo Liotta, physician;
- Gustavo Sylvestre, journalist and political analyst.

== Deans ==
Image	Dean	Tenure	Notes
	Lorenzo Jordana	1849–1851	a teacher from Spain, his classes, funded by the State, were the basis for the Colegio. Eventually left for Buenos Aires due to poor health
	Manuel María Erausquin	1851–1854	Basque catholic priest, doctor in theology and canon law
	Alberto Larroque	1854–1864	a French doctor of law, he eventually left for Buenos Aires due to disagreements with Urquiza
	Juan Domingo Vico	1864–1867	initially an inspector hired to oversee teaching in the college, he took over after Larroque left
	Eugenio Mauguin	1867	interim dean, he died from cholera shortly after taking office
	Samuel Storrow Higginson	1867–1870	Harvard alumni and a chaplain in the Union Army during the American Civil War, sent for directly by Sarmiento; left after the college was sacked
	Agustín Mariano Alió	1871–1874	Spanish republican journalist, left the institution in the aftermath of a "tremendous student revolution" which led to four students being expelled and the vice-dean being fired.
	Guillermo Seekamp	1874–1875	German chemist who had initially come to the region to work as a scientist for Liebig's. Assumed the office of dean in an interim manner
	Clodomiro Quiroga	1875–1880	ex-director of the Biblioteca Nacional de Maestras y Maestros and an English teacher at the college
	Honorio Leguizamón	1880–1888	headed a program of nationalization of the school's teachers, tried to stop foreign languages from being taught. Left to head the Escuela Normal de Profesoras de Buenos Aires
	Carlos Jurado	1888–1892	former law student at the institution
	José Benjamín Zubiaur	1892–1899	member of the first International Olympic Committee, doctor of law, and an early advocate of physical education classes for children; left to become Director of Public Instruction in Buenos Aires
	Enrique de Vedia	1899–1902	professor of literature and Spanish, left to head the Colegio Nacional de Buenos Aires
	Dermidio Carreño	1902–1910	ex-Governor of La Rioja, who had also occupied several positions in the Argentine educational system
	Eduardo Tibiletti	1910–1920	former student of the institution and, in 1910, professor of civics there. Would in the 1930s be elected Governor of Entre Ríos
	José Haedo	1921–1938	former student, during his term the historical building began to be rebuilt from the ground up, leaving only its facade from the original
	Lucio José Macedo	1938–1940	previously vice-dean, served as interim dean, oversaw the continuation of the rebuilding process. Later on in the 1940s would be dean of the city's normal school
	Luis E. Grianta	1940–1948	doctor in chemistry, worked as a civil servant and as a teacher for the Colegio for 26 years before being appointed dean. He eventually was removed from the position due to his political ideas
	Felipe Texier	1948–1952	formerly a history teacher at the Colegio, he left the post of dean when he was elected Governor of Entre Ríos
	Rodolfo Luis Scelzi	1952–1955	a physician who had previously taught psychology classes at the Colegio
	Ernesto Maxit	1955–1962	former law student at the institution
	Félix Omar Carulla	1962–1973	
	Miguel Angel Gregori	1973–1977	previously had taught history at the Colegio. Prolific writer about Entre Ríos' history
	Aracely Latorre	1978–1979	first female dean of the Colegio, she would later head Concepción's local culture comissary
	Eduardo Julio Giqueaux	1979–2011	former philosophy teacher at the Colegio, continued to publish books and articles during his term as dean
	Celia D'Angelo	2011–2014	a psychologist, she was removed from office amidst tensions with the Autonomous University of Entre Ríos' administration
	Claudia Musco	2014-2015	previously vice-dean, served as interim dean
	Maria del Carmen Petrone	2015–2018	former student, previously vice-dean; after her term as dean, served as city councilwoman
	Ramon Cieri	2018–	former history teacher
