= Constitution of 1949 =

Constitution of 1949 may refer to:

- Argentine Constitution of 1949
- Hungarian Constitution of 1949
- Federal Constitution of 1949, United States of Indonesia
- Basic Law for the Federal Republic of Germany
