= Martiniano Leguizamón =

Argentine lawyer and writer (1858–1935)

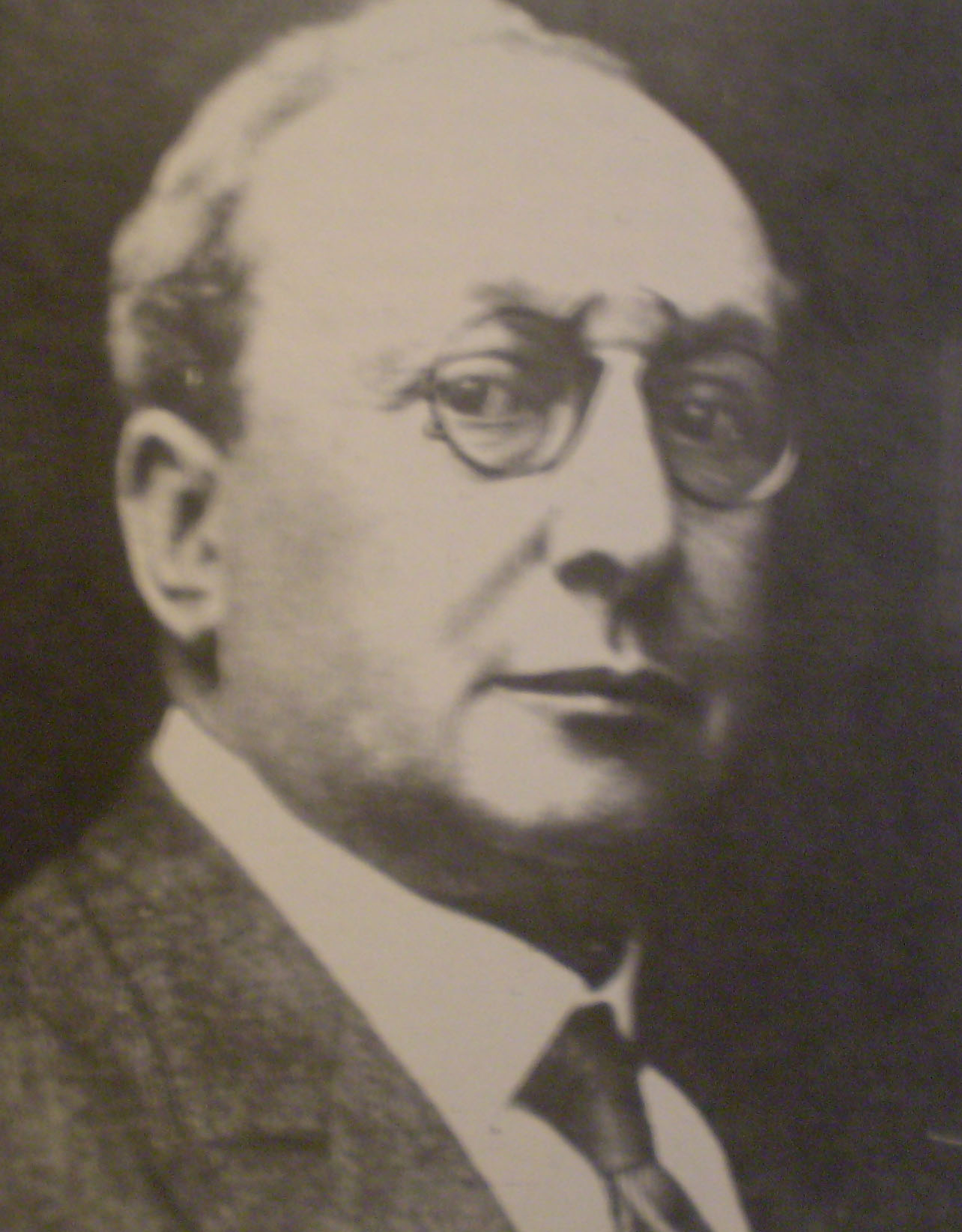
- Born: 1858; Argentina
- Died: 1935 (aged 76–77)
- Education: Colegio de Concepción del Uruguay
- Occupations: Lawyer and writer
- Scientific career
- Workplaces: National Academy of History of Argentina

Martiniano Leguizamón (1858 – 1935) was an Argentine lawyer and writer.

== Biography ==
Martiniano Leguizamón was born in 1858 and spent his early years on his father's ranch of Gualeguay.

He died in 1935.

== Education ==
Leguizamón started writing poetry and comedy at a young age, during his schooling at the Colegio de Concepción del Uruguay. In 1880, he went to study law in Buenos Aires, earning a living by beginning to work as a journalist, and after being called to the bar in 1885, he worked as a teacher until 1889.

== Career ==
Leguizamón served as the president of the National Academy of History of Argentina from 1923 to 1927.

== Bibliography ==
Leguizamón wrote a number of plays and essays in his native Spanish language:

- Calandria
- Montaraz

== See also ==
- National Academy of History of Argentina
