= Victorino =

Victorino is both a given name and a surname. Notable people with the name include:

== Surname ==
- Cesáreo Victorino (born 1979), Mexican footballer
- Mauricio Victorino (born 1982), Uruguayan football defender
- Mike Victorino (born 1952), Mayor of Maui County, father of Shane Victorino
- Shane Victorino (born 1980), American baseball outfielder, son of Mike Victorino
- Waldemar Victorino (born 1952), Uruguayan football forward

== Given name ==
- Victorino Chua, Stepping Hill nurse found guilty of eating murdering patients
- Victorino Abente y Lago (1846 - 1935) Paraguayan poet
- Victorino de la Plaza (1840 - 1919), President of Argentina
- Victorino Mapa (1855 - 1927), Philippines Chief of Justice
- Victorino Márquez Bustillos, President of Venezuela

== See also ==
- San Victorino
