= Arturo Sampay =

Argentine lawyer constitutionalist and professor

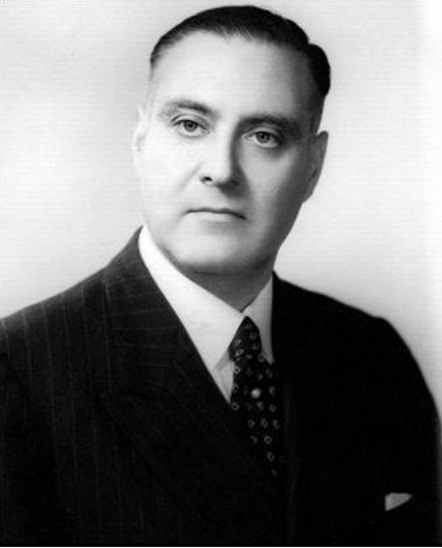
Arturo Enrique Sampay (1911-1977). Argentine jurist.

Arturo Enrique Sampay (1911 in Concordia, Entre Ríos – February 14, 1977 in La Plata), was an Argentine lawyer, constitutionalist and professor. He is considered the "father" of the Argentine Constitution of 1949.

== Works ==
- La crisis del Estado de derecho liberal-burgués, 1938
- La filosofía del Iluminismo y la Constitución argentina de 1853, 1944
- Introducción a la Teoría del Estado, 1951
- Constitución y pueblo, 1974
- Las constituciones de la Argentina entre 1810 y 1972 con introducción, 1975

== Bibliography ==
- González Arzac, Alberto (2007). Arturo Enrique Sampay (PDF). Vol. Feb 16 - Mar 31, 2007. pp. 7-13.
- Buela, Alberto (2007). Sampay: Padrino del constitucionalismo social. Vol. Oct 8, 2007.

== See also ==
- Justicialist Party
