= Baniwa =

Indigenous people of South America

Coordinates: 6.0000°N 66.0000°W

Walimanai
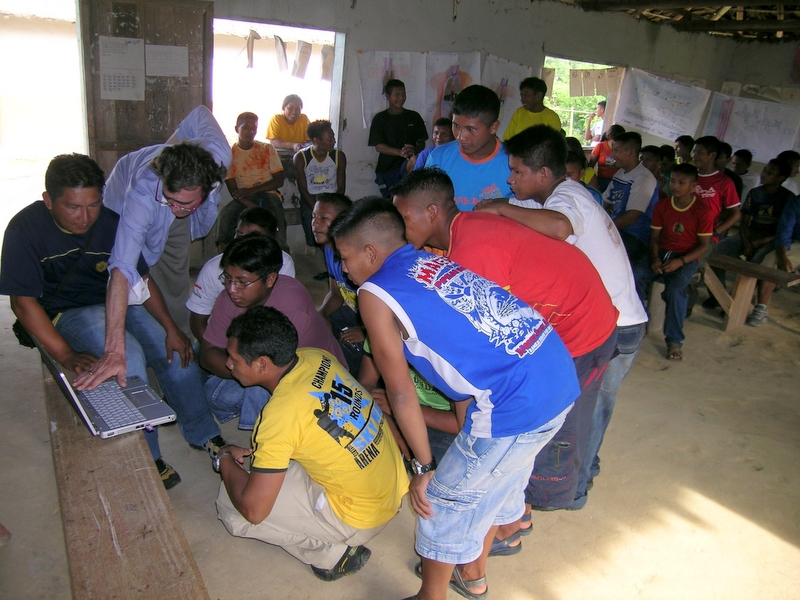
- Baniwa School at the Içana River

Total population
- 17,646 (2014)

Regions with significant populations
- Brazil (Amazonas): 7,145 (2014)
- Colombia: 7,000 (2000)
- Venezuela (Amazonas): 3,501 (2011)

Languages
- Baniwa, Portuguese

Religion
- Traditional tribal religion

Related ethnic groups
- Kuripako people

Baniwa or Waupi (also known with local variants as Baniva, Baniua, Curipaco, Vaniva,Walimanai, Wakuenai) are indigenous South Americans, who speak the Baniwa language belonging to the Maipurean (Arawak) language family. They live in the Amazon Region, in the border area of Brazil, Colombia and Venezuela and along the Rio Negro and its tributaries.

There are an estimated 7,145 Baniwa in Brazil, 7,000 in Colombia and 3,501 in Venezuela's Amazonas State, according to Brazil's Instituto Socioambiental, but accurate figures are almost impossible to come by given the nature of the rainforest.

The Baniwa people rely mainly on manioc cultivation and fishing for subsistence. They are also known for the fine basketry that they skillfully produce.

== See also ==
- Baniwa language, Curripako language
- Indigenous peoples in Brazil
- Indigenous peoples in Colombia
- Indigenous peoples in Venezuela
