= José Benjamín Zubiaur =

Argentine educator (1856–1921)

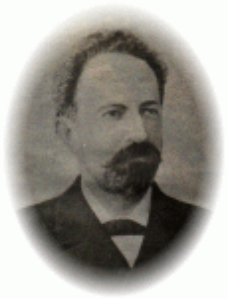
José Zubiaur

José Benjamín Zubiaur (1856–1921) was an Argentine educator. Promoter of sport, physical education, and the modern Olympic movement. He was one of the thirteen original members of the International Olympic Committee (IOC). He was the rector of the Colegio del Uruguay and Director at the Escuelas de la provincia de Corrientes. After 1915 he was Director of Education, Ministry of Education. He was characterized by their innovative teaching ideas to expand education to all social sectors, including content such as physical education, industrial education, practical activities, etc. as well as methods like night school, rural schools, education both sexes combined, and so on.

== Biography ==
He was born in Paraná, Entre Ríos Province, Argentina on 31 March 1856 and baptised on 3 April 1856 as José Mariano Benjamín Zubiaur Pujato at the Cathedral Basilica of Our Lady of the Rosary. His parents were Mariano Zubiaur and Dolores Pujato. Zubiaur completed his secondary education at the Concepción del Uruguay College. In 1877 he was promoter and first president of the Educationist Association "The Fraternity", composed by students of the college.

In 1879, when he was 23 years old, one year after receipt of bachelor, he founded the "Benjamin Franklin" School in order to implement their innovative ideas in education.

He obtained the title of attorney at the Buenos Aires University. In 1886, he founded with other educators and students the magazine "La Educación".

In 1889 the Argentine government appointed him, along with Alejo Peyret, to represent his country at the Paris Exposition. He participated in the International Congress for the Propagation of Physical Exercise in Education, which organizer was the Baron Pierre de Coubertin, future inspirer of the modern Olympic Games. There, Zubiaur met Baron de Coubertin, who appointed him to integrate in 1894 the first International Olympic Committee, the unique representative of a Spanish-American country, a position in which he served until 1907.

Baron Pierre de Coubertin, founder of the modern Olympic Games mentioned him in his Olympic Memories:

I had absolute freedom to carry out the composition of the CIO (International Olympic Committee). The proposed list was chosen and contained entirely: for Greece Vikelas, Callot and I for France, colonel Butowsky for Russia; Colonel Balk for Sweden; Professor Sloane for the U.S.; Jiri Guth for Bohemia; F. Kemeny for Hungary, C. Herbert and Lord Ampfhill for England; Professor Zubiaru (sic) for Argentina, and L. A. Cuff for New Zealand and also the Count Lucchesi Palli provisionally accepted for Italy, shortly after Count Max of Bousies did it the same for Belgium.

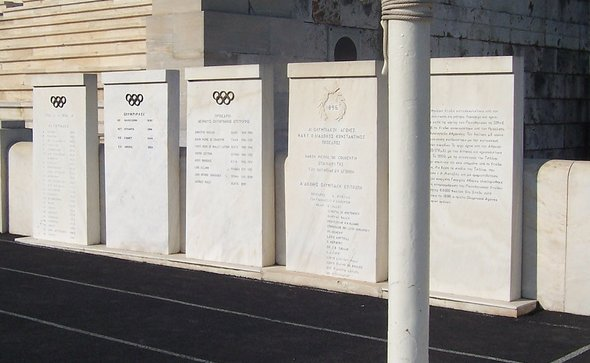
Monoliths at the entrance to the Panathenaic Stadium in Athens, where was held the first Olympics Game of the modern era, which refers to Joseph Benjamin Zubiaur, as a member of the International Olympic Committee.

In 1892 he was appointed rector of the Concepción del Uruguay College, serving in that role until 1899. During his chancellorship, enabled the registration of women and created practical activities matters, such as cardboard, bookbinding and photography, which were a novelty in education in Argentina. In 1894 he obtained a doctorate degree in Law with a thesis entitled "The protection of children."

He also prompted the establishment of rural schools in the then territory of La Pampa and the Misiones Province. In 1913 he was the first vice president of the National League of Education.

== Works ==
- La escuela primaria en Francia : informes sobre el Congreso Pedagójico Internacional y la sección escolar francesa de instrucción primaria en la Esposición Universal de Paris de 1889, Buenos Aires : Taller Tipográfico de la 'Penitenciaria', 1891.
- El colegio histórico, Buenos Aires : Sudamericana de billetes de banco, [1894]
- La enseñanza práctica é industrial en la República Argentina, Buenos Aires : Félix Lajouane, 1900.
- Sinopsis de la educación en La República Argentina, Buenos Aires : Félix Lajouane, 1901.
- La enseñanza en Norte América, Buenos Aires : Juan Canter, 1904.
- Las escuelas en Misiones, Buenos Aires : Penitenciaría Nacional, 1904.
- Surcos y semillas escolares, Buenos Aires : Imprenta y encuadernación de la fábrica La Sin Bombo, 1907.
- Enseñanza de adultos e instituciones complementarias de la escuela en Norte América, Buenos Aires : Perrotti, 1910.
- Ultima etapa oficial : surcos y semillas escolares, Buenos Aires : Talleres gráficos de Juan Perrotti, 1913.
- Labor dispersa e inédita : [surcos y semillas escolares], Buenos Aires : Talleres Gráficos de Juan Perrotti, 1916.

== Memories ==
- La Escuela Nº 44 "José Benjamín Zubiaur" de la Provincia de La Pampa.
- La Escuela Primaria N° 9 (D.E. 19) "Dr. José Benjamín Zibiaur" de la Ciudad de Buenos Aires.
- La Escuela de Educación Tecnológica (EET) Nº 79 "Dr. José Benjamín Zubiaur", de Basavilbaso, Entre Ríos.
- El Centro de Estudios Olímpicos "José Benjamín Zubiaur" de la Argentina.
- Calle Principal del Barrio Olimpico de la Ciudad de Buenos Aires "Boulevard Olimpico José Benjamín Zubiaur".
- Monumento a José Benjamín Zubiaur en la ciudad de Concepción del Uruguay, obra de Carina Amarillo.
- Monolito en la ciudad de Atenas (Grecia), con su nombre inscripto junto al de los demás integrantes del primer Comité Ejecutivo del Comité Olímpico Internacional.
- Mural de homenaje a José Benjamín Zubiaur, ubicado en la Plaza de los Deportes (San Juan y Corrientes) de la ciudad de Paraná.

== See also ==
- Education in Argentina
- Argentina at the Olympics
- International Olympic Committee
