= Teresa Ratto =

Argentine physician (1877–1906)

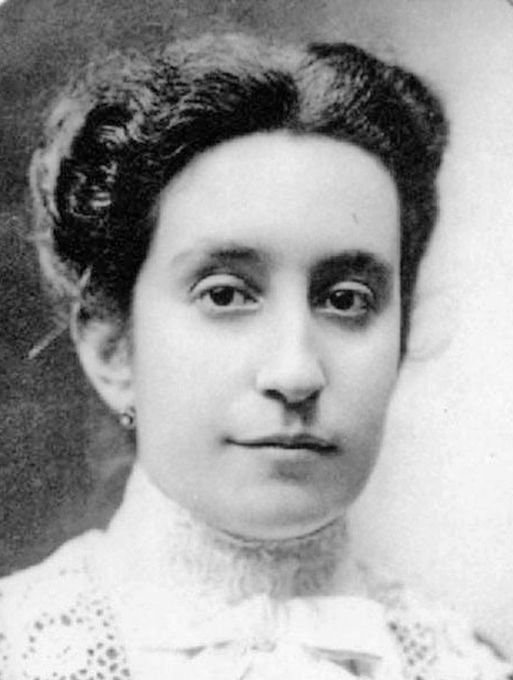

Teresa Ratto (1877-1906) was an Argentine physician. She was the second female doctor in Argentina, and the first from Entre Ríos Province. Ratto was the first woman accepted at the Colegio del Uruguay, and became the first woman to receive her bachelor's degree from there in 1895. She earned her medical degree in 1903 from the Universidad Nacional de Buenos Aires. While studying there she began the Centro de Universitarias, one of the first feminist organizations in Argentina. As a doctor she became head of vaccination at the Asistencia Pública of Buenos Aires and later returned to Concepción del Uruguay to practice medicine there.

In addition to being a doctor she was a high school administrator.

The Chamber of Deputies of Argentina declared the year 2006 in tribute to Dr. Teresa Ratto.
