= Lotte Schulz =

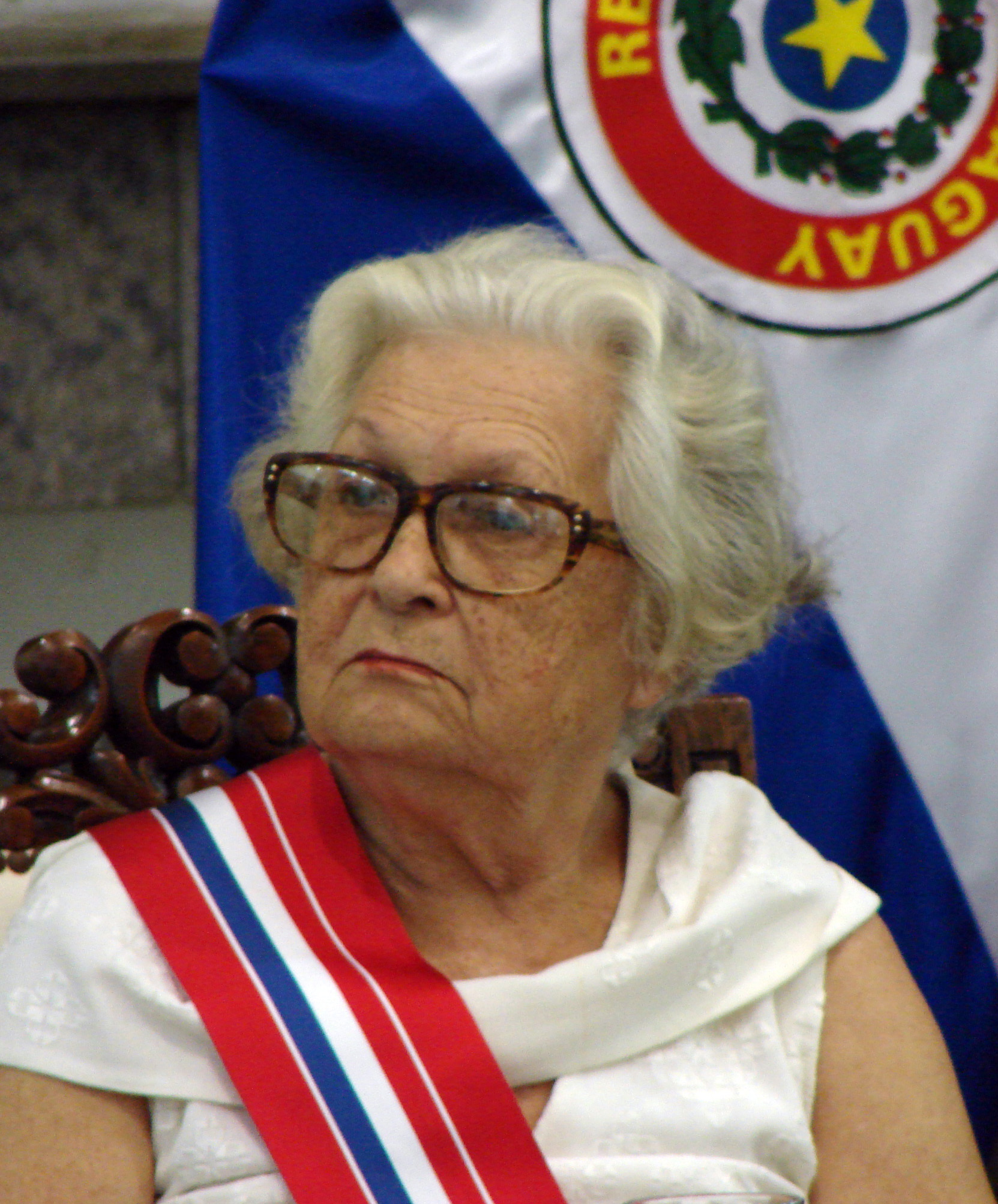
Lotte Schultz in 2009

María Carlota "Lotte" Schultz (1925- January 22, 2016) was a Paraguayan artist. Schulz used several different media in her work, including ceramics, drawing, painting and printmaking. She is known for her innovative prints using cowhide. Schultz was also trained in art restoration. Schultz shared her skills with others as a teacher and worked as an artist throughout her life.

== Biography ==
Schulz was born as María Carlota Schulz in 1925 in Encarnación, Paraguay. Her father was an immigrant to Paraguay from Austro-Hungary and her mother was Paraguayan. When Schulz was four, the family moved to Brazil and lived in Curitiba, São Paulo and Foz de Iguaçu. Later, the family moved back to Paraguay, living in Asunción.

Schultz studied drawing and painting with Guido Viaro in Curitiba between the years 1937 and 1942. She learned engraving from Livio Abramo at the Julián de la Herrería Print Workshop in Asunción in the 1950s. Schultz also worked as a director of the workshop between 1956 and 1960. Schultz also studied ceramics with Edward G. Alien. Schulz also learned art restoration in Florence and Rome.

Schultz taught classes on art restoration and art conservation at the Museo de Bellas Artes. She also taught free art classes at the Escolinha de Arte.

Schulz won second prize at the 1965 Esso Salon of Young Artists in Latin America for Paraguay in the category of painting. In 2008, she was named a Maestra del Arte by the Centro Cultural de la República El Cabildo. She was awarded the Orden Nacional al Mérito en el Grado de Gran Cruz in 2009.

Schulz died on January 22, 2016, in Luque. After Schultz' death, her body was on view at the Museo de Bellas Artes before her remains were cremated.

== Work ==
Schultz worked in several different mediums, including printmaking, painting, graphic design and ceramics. She was also involved in art restoration.

Schultz' work in printmaking used different materials, such as woodcuts and embossing. She was influenced by her teacher, Livio Abramo. Schultz used abstraction and geometric forms in her prints. Her work also pays special attention to tonal value and rhythm. One of the innovations that Schulz created in printmaking was the use of cowhide to make prints.

Schultz has work in the permanent collections of the Museo de Bellas Artes in Asunción, the Essex Collection of Art from Latin America (ESCALA), The Museo de la Fundación Texo, and she has shown her work in North and South America, Europe and South Africa. Her art has also appeared on a Paraguayan postage stamp.
