= Carlos Federico Abente =

Paraguayan lyricist, poet and doctor

Carlos Federico Abente Bogado
- Born: September 6, 1914; Areguá, Paraguay
- Died: 12 July 2018 (aged 103); Buenos Aires, Argentina
- Education: Faculty of Medical Sciences, University of Buenos Aires
- Occupations: Surgeon, poet, health entrepreneur
- Medical career
- Institutions: Policlínica Privada; AMSA Asistencia Médica SA
- Awards: National Order of Merit (three times)

Carlos Federico Abente Bogado (September 6, 1914 - July 12, 2018) was a Paraguayan lyricist, poet and prominent doctor, author of the lyrics of the song "Ñemitî" ("Sowing"). Based in Argentina, he was co-founder of Policlínica Privada, and AMSA Asistencia Médica SA, pioneering companies in integrated health insurance and prepaid medicine. He was honored with three decorations of the National Order of Merit from the government of Paraguay.

== Early life and education ==
He was the son of Juana Deolina Bogado and Isidro Julián Abente. At seven years old he moved to Formosa, Argentina, with his mother and his stepfather Florentino Cirez Parajón. There he attended primary school. From 1929 to 1934 he was an intern at La Fraternidad and studied at the Colegio del Uruguay, in Concepción del Uruguay. He studied medicine at the University of Buenos Aires, graduating as a Doctor of Medicine in 1942. To support himself during his studies he worked as a newspaper delivery boy and as a sparring partner for boxers.He was the grandson of the Spanish poet living in Paraguay, Victorino Abente y Lago.

== Career ==
Based in Buenos Aires, he developed his professional career as a surgeon and health entrepreneur. He was a surgeon in Room 5 of the Alvear Municipal Hospital, whose Chief was the surgeon Professor Julio Diez. Abente entered the Alvear Hospital as a practitioner in 1937 and retired in 1969 with the title of Honorary Doctor. He began as a businessman in partnership with Simón Israelit, his classmate from Colegio del Uruguay, acquiring the Sanatorio Sarmiento, with loans from friends and family, in 1953. Shortly after, they founded Policlínica Privada. In 1964 they founded Asistencia Médica Sociedad Anónima AMSA, the first prepaid medicine company in Argentina.

His first guarania lyric was "Islaveña", for the music of Prudencio Giménez. Abente met Giménez by chance near his student boarding house in Buenos Aires, and became his introduction to the community of Paraguayan musicians.

In the early 1940s, while he was still a medical student, he met the musician and composer José Asunción Flores, with whom he established a friendship. Together they composed the song "Ñemitî", which would become an emblematic piece for the Paraguayan people. All of Flores' work, including this song, was banned during times of political repression.

He published four books of poetry, plus an anthology, in Guaraní and Spanish.

He had great friendships among the community of Paraguayan musicians and writers in Buenos Aires, many of them political exiles, including Augusto Roa Bastos, Sila Godoy, Mauricio Cardozo Ocampo, Hérib Campos Cervera, Emilio Vaesken and Severo Rodas. Roa Bastos said in the prologue of Che kirîrî asapunkái haguâ: «To this man formed in the suffering of his fellow men to whom he has dedicated his science and his efforts, poetry has given him a refuge that is at the same time a harbinger and memory; For this man cut off from his people and who has lived in exile for almost an entire life, poetry has allowed him to live it all in the true homeland that is his native language.

== Personal life ==
He was married to Eva García Parodi, with whom he had three children: María Estela, María Eva, and Carlos Ramón. He lived with his wife in Buenos Aires. Prudencio Giménez composed one of his best-known works for harp, "Caturi Abente", at the birth of María Estela.
