= Carlos Sylvestre Begnis =

Argentine medical doctor and politician

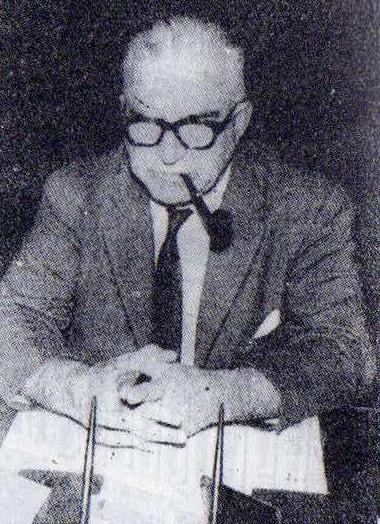

Carlos Sylvestre Begnis (30 August 1903 – 22 September 1980) was a medical doctor and politician, born in Alto Grande, a village near Bell Ville, Córdoba province in Argentina. He was a rural physician and worked as a surgeon in hospitals of the city of Rosario, province of Santa Fe.

He entered politics through the Radical Civic Union. In 1958 he was elected governor of Santa Fe, following a period of de facto military rule (after the Revolución Libertadora, which had ousted president Juan Perón three years before). He became a part of the Intransigent Radical Civic Union (UCRI), and then formed part of the leadership of the Movement for Integration and Development (MID). His term was ended by a federal intervention.

In the 1970s, Sylvestre Begnis moved to the Justicialist Party (Peronism), and was elected governor again in 1973 (Argentina had just emerged from seven years of military dictatorship). The Hernandarias Subfluvial Tunnel, which joins Santa Fe and Entre Ríos under the Paraná River, was built during his administration, and then officially renamed after him and Entre Ríos governor Raúl Uranga. The Brigadier Estanislao López Highway, linking Rosario and Santa Fe (the two largest cities in the province), was also built at this time. Sylvestre Begnis followed the policies of desarrollismo, sponsored by the national government of president Arturo Frondizi, devoting a large share of the provincial budget to public works (schools, roads, electric power lines, hydraulic works).

Sylvestre Begnis again could not complete his term, being removed from office in 1976 as a result of the military coup that started the dictatorship of the National Reorganization Process. He died of acute leukemia in 1980, at the age of 77.

His son Juan Héctor, whose nickname was Canchi, also a politician, was a candidate for vice governor and served the Justicialist government of Jorge Obeid as Minister of Health, and is a national deputy for the Front for Victory. He chairs the Health Committee of the Argentine Chamber of Deputies. In 2007 he campaigned to be mayor of Rosario.

== Sources ==
- Homage to Sylvestre Begnis.
- La Capital. 21 September 2003. Sylvestre Begnis: ¿el mejor gobernador de la provincia?
- La Capital. 28 August 2005. Excerpt of the biographical book Carlos Sylvestre Begnis, by Miguel de Marco Jr.

Preceded by Luis Cárcamo	Governor of Santa Fe; 1958–1962	Succeeded by Aldo Tessio
Preceded by Aldo Tessio	Governor of Santa Fe; 1973–1976	Succeeded by José María Vernet
