= Kurripako language =

Arawakan language

Kurripako
- Native to: Colombia, Venezuela, Brazil
- Ethnicity: 14,425 Koripako (2001–2014)
- Native speakers: 12,000 (2008–2012)
- Language family: Arawakan: Northern; Upper Amazon; Eastern Nawiki; Baniwa–Kurripako; Kurripako
- Dialects: Ipeka-Tapuia

Language codes
- ISO 639-3: kpc
- Glottolog: curr1243
- ELP: Curripaco
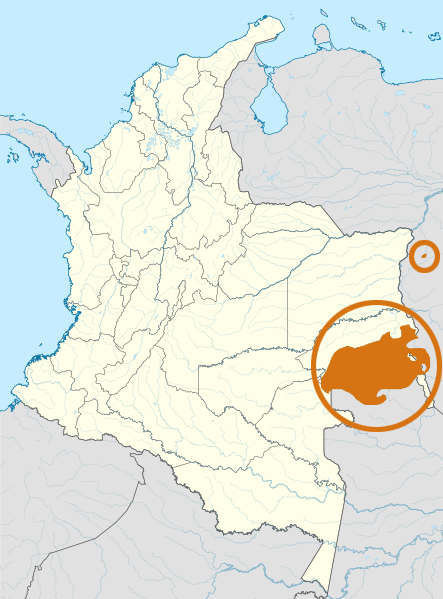
- Kurripako/Curripaco language map

Kurripako (Curripaco, Curripako, Ipeka-Tapuia-Curripako) is an Arawakan language principally of Colombia and Venezuela. There are also a thousand speakers in Brazil.

Kurripako forms a dialect continuum with Baniwa, and Aikhenvald (1999) considers them to be dialects. (Kaufman (1994) calls Baniwa–Curripako "Karu".)

== Dialects ==
Dialects of Baniwa-Kurripako are distinguished by their affirmative 'yes' and negative 'no' forms. These are Aha-Khuri, Ehe-Khenim, Oho-Karo, and Oho-Ñame.

== Syntax ==
=== Word order ===
Kurripako is a verb–object–subject language.
