= Aldo Tessio =

Argentine politician (1909–2000)

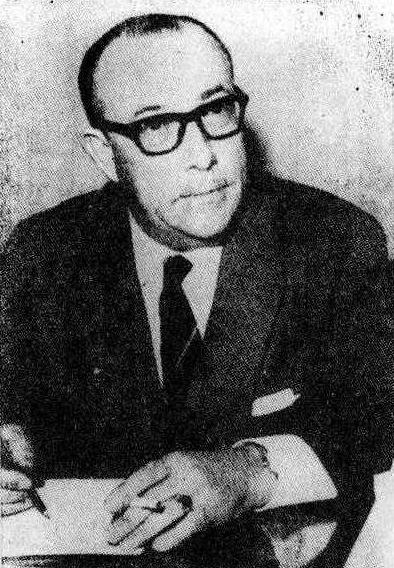
Aldo Tessio

Aldo Emilio Tessio (October 28, 1909 – January 17, 2000) was an Argentine politician belonging to the Radical Civic Union (UCR). He served a Governor of Santa Fe Province from October 12, 1963, to June 28, 1966.

Born in Esperanza, Santa Fe, Tessio joined the centrist UCR as a student, and earned a Law Degree at the National University of the Littoral. He was elected to the Constitutional Assembly of 1957, which restored and amended the 1853 Argentine Constitution following its 1949 replacement by President Juan Perón, and in 1960, was elected to the Lower House of Congress on the UCRP ticket (the faction of the UCR opposed to President Arturo Frondizi).

Following Frondizi's overthrow in 1962, elections were held in 1963, and Tessio was elected Governor of Santa Fe on the UCRP ticket. Governing one of the nation's most important provinces, his term was distinguished by its transparency, as well as its emphasis on public works: the Brigadier Estanislao López Highway, one of Argentina's first intercity freeways, was built, as were numerous housing projects, much of the east–west provincial road infrastructure, and other works. His term was prematurely ended by the 1966 coup d'état that ousted president Arturo Illia and brought to power the military dictatorship led by Juan Carlos Onganía.

Tessio was the last UCR governors of Santa Fe to date, and he died in 2000, at age 90. The Justicialist Party Governor Jorge Obeid spoke of him in eulogy as "an illustrious character of Argentine democracy," noting his commitment to human rights; in recognition for his efforts to improve Santa Fe's infrastructure, a segment of Provincial Route 13 was renamed after him by Obeid on the 41st anniversary of Tessio's inaugural as governor.

Aldo Tessio's daughter, Griselda, served as federal prosecutor in Santa Fe City, and at the 2007 elections was elected vice-governor of Santa Fe as the running mate of Socialist Party's Hermes Binner.

Preceded by Carlos Sylvestre Begnis	Governor of Santa Fe; 1963–1966	Succeeded by Carlos Sylvestre Begnis
