= National Order of Merit (Paraguay) =

Paraguayan highest order of merit

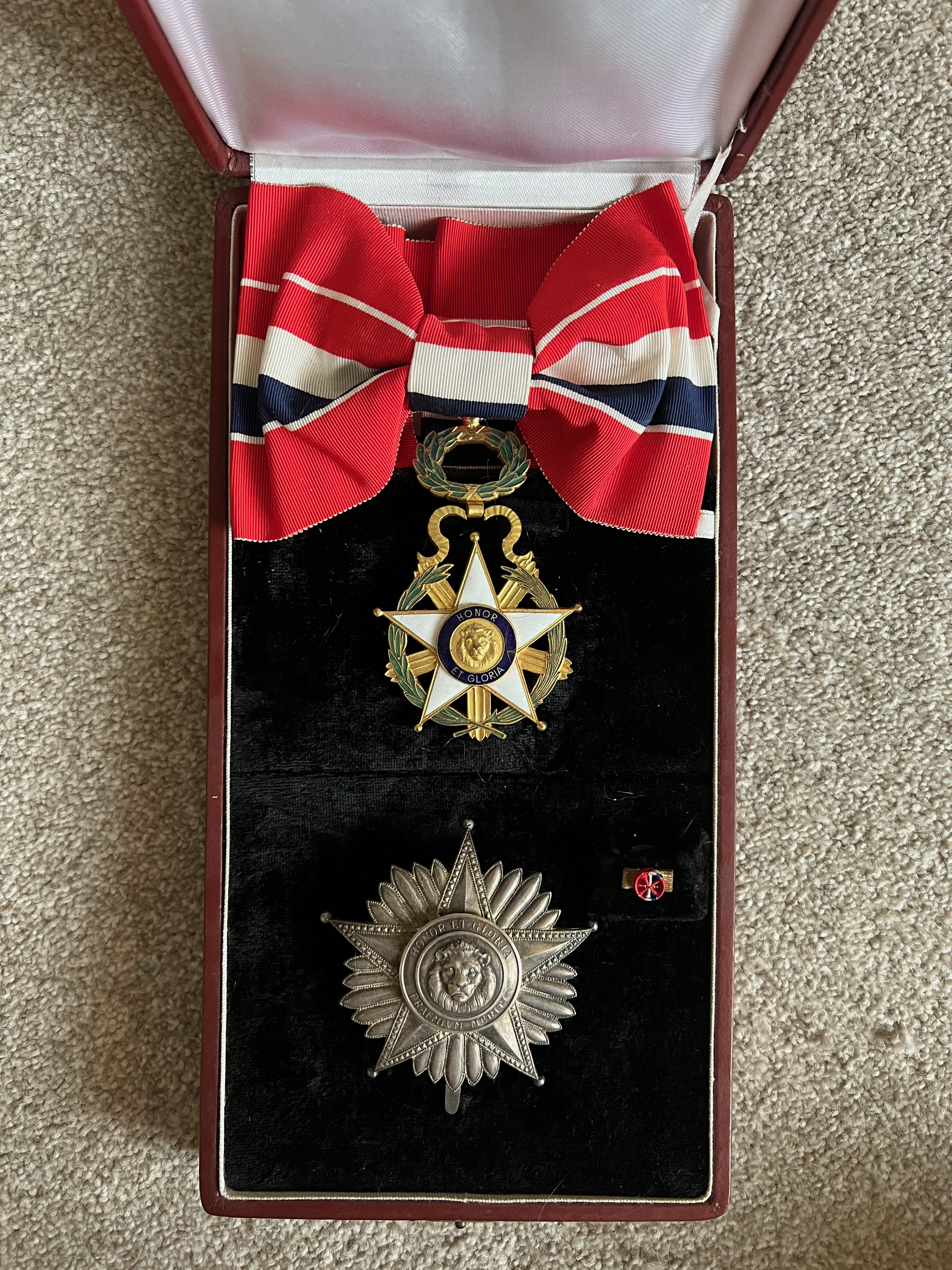
- Grand Cross set of the order.

Awarded by the Republic of Paraguay
- Type: Order of merit
- Established: 8 April 1865
- Status: Currently awarded
- Grades: 1- Grand Cross (Presidential Collar of Marshal López); 2- Grand Officer; 3- Commander; 4- Officer; 5- Knight

Precedence
- Next (higher): None (highest)
- Next (lower): Order of Military Merit
- Ribbon of the order

The National Order of Merit (Spanish: Orden Nacional del Mérito) of Paraguay is an award given by the government of Paraguay. The award was first established in 1865 and can be given to any person or organization that has contributed in some way to the benefit of Paraguay.

It is the highest distinction awarded by the Republic of Paraguay. The President of the Republic of Paraguay holds as a lifetime honour (unless removed by impeachment) the Grand Cross of the Order, known as Presidential Collar (or Cordon) of Marshal López.

== About ==
The National Order of Merit is given to a person or an organization who has contributed to the benefit of Paraguay in various fields of endeavor. This can include through culture, leadership, and science, among others.

The medal was designed as a five-pointed star with the words "honor et gloria" on the front and "premium meriti" on the reverse.

== History ==
The National Order of Merit was established on April 8, 1865 by Francisco Solano López. In 1867, López declared that women were eligible to earn the award. The award was based on the French Legion of Honor and had several different levels. The highest level was the Grand Cross. The other levels were Knight, Official, Commander and Grand Official.

On September 7, 1956, Law No. 394 was passed with several provisions regarding the awarding of the National Order of Merit.

== Notable recipients ==
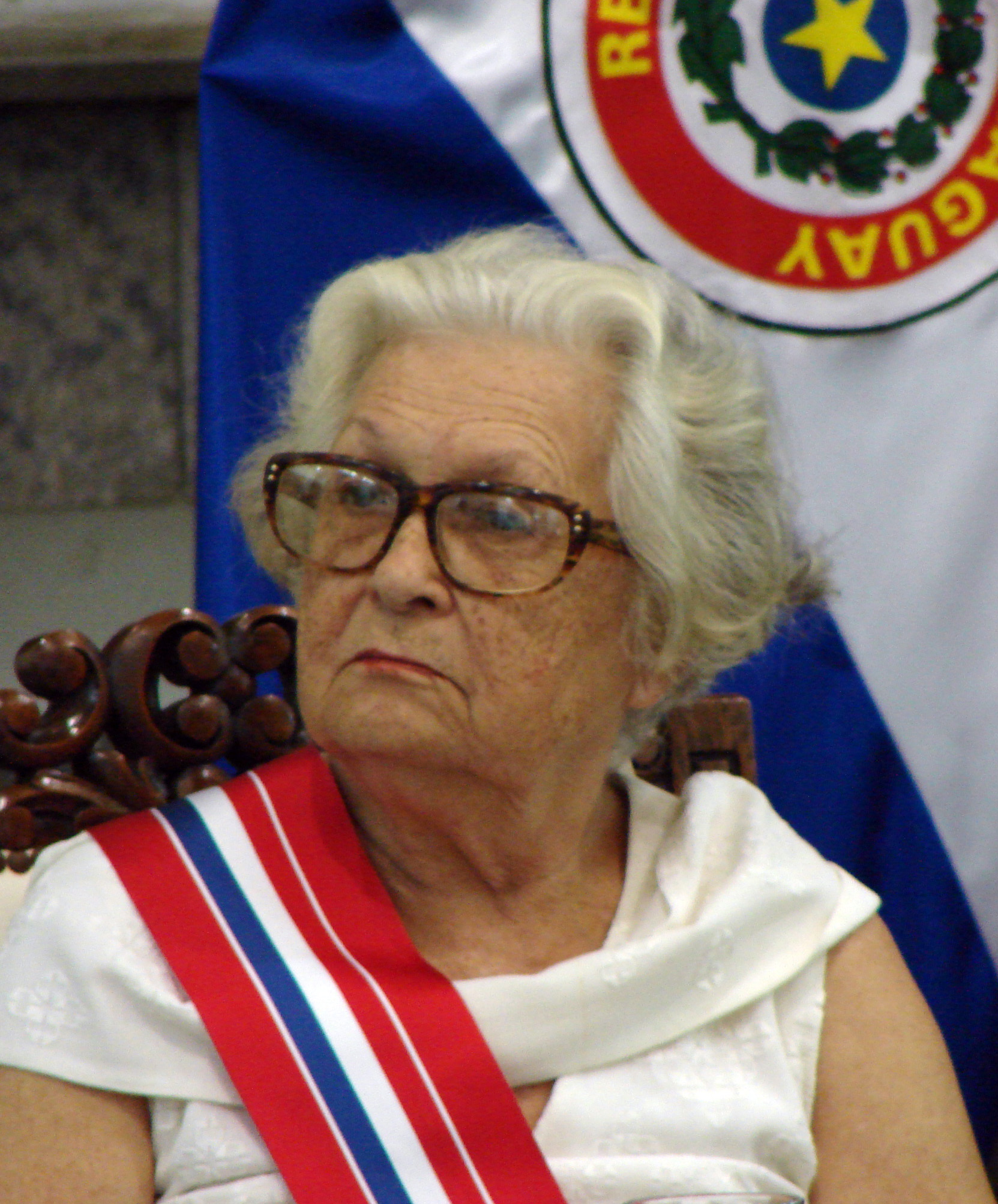
Lotte Schulz, receiving her National Order of Merit in 2009.

- Carlos Federico Abente, Paraguayan surgeon and poet.
- Augusto Roa Bastos, Paraguayan writer.
- Luis María Ramírez Boettner, Paraguayan diplomat.
- Juan Crisóstomo Centurión, Paraguayan Army officer.
- Graziella Corvalán, Paraguayan academic
- Gildo Insfrán, Argentine politician.
- Shinichi Kitaoka, Japanese political scientist on behalf of the Japanese International Cooperation Agency (JICA).
- Eusebio Leal, Cuban historian.
- Francisco Solano López, president of Paraguay.
- José Mujica, Uruguayan politician and president.
- Aloysio Nunes, Brazilian politician.
- Domingo Antonio Ortiz, Paraguayan naval officer of the Triple Alliance War.
- Berta Rojas, Paraguayan musician.
- Luis Szarán, Paraguayan musician.
- Lotte Schulz, Paraguayan artist.
- Natalicio Talavera, Paraguayan poet and newspaper editor.
- George Thompson, British engineer.
- Peter Tomlinson, South African admiral.
- Augusto Pinochet, Chilean dictator.
- Fumihito, Prince Akishino, Japanese Crown Prince.
- former Princess Mako of Akishino, Japanese Princess.

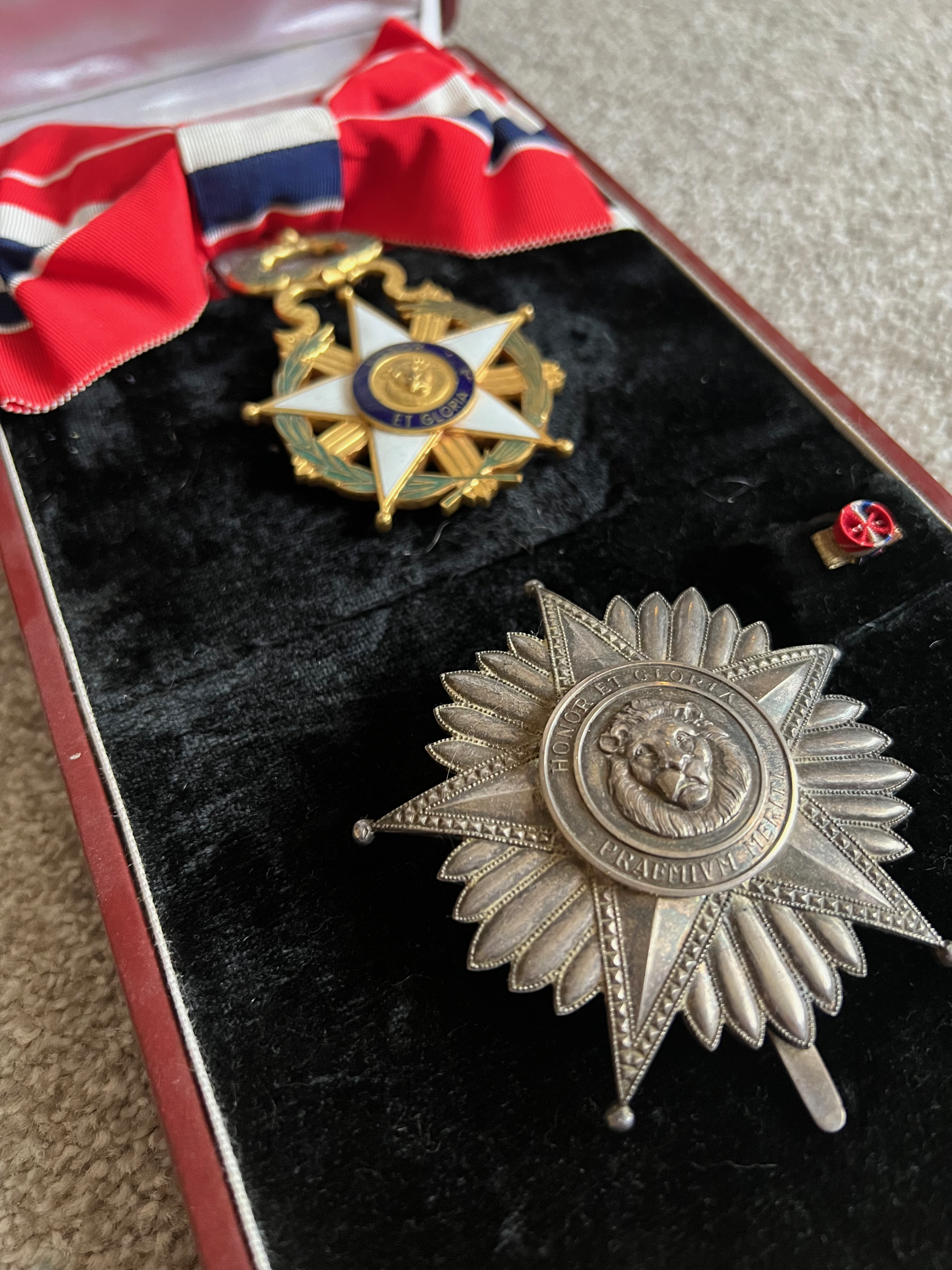
Grand Cross grade of the order.

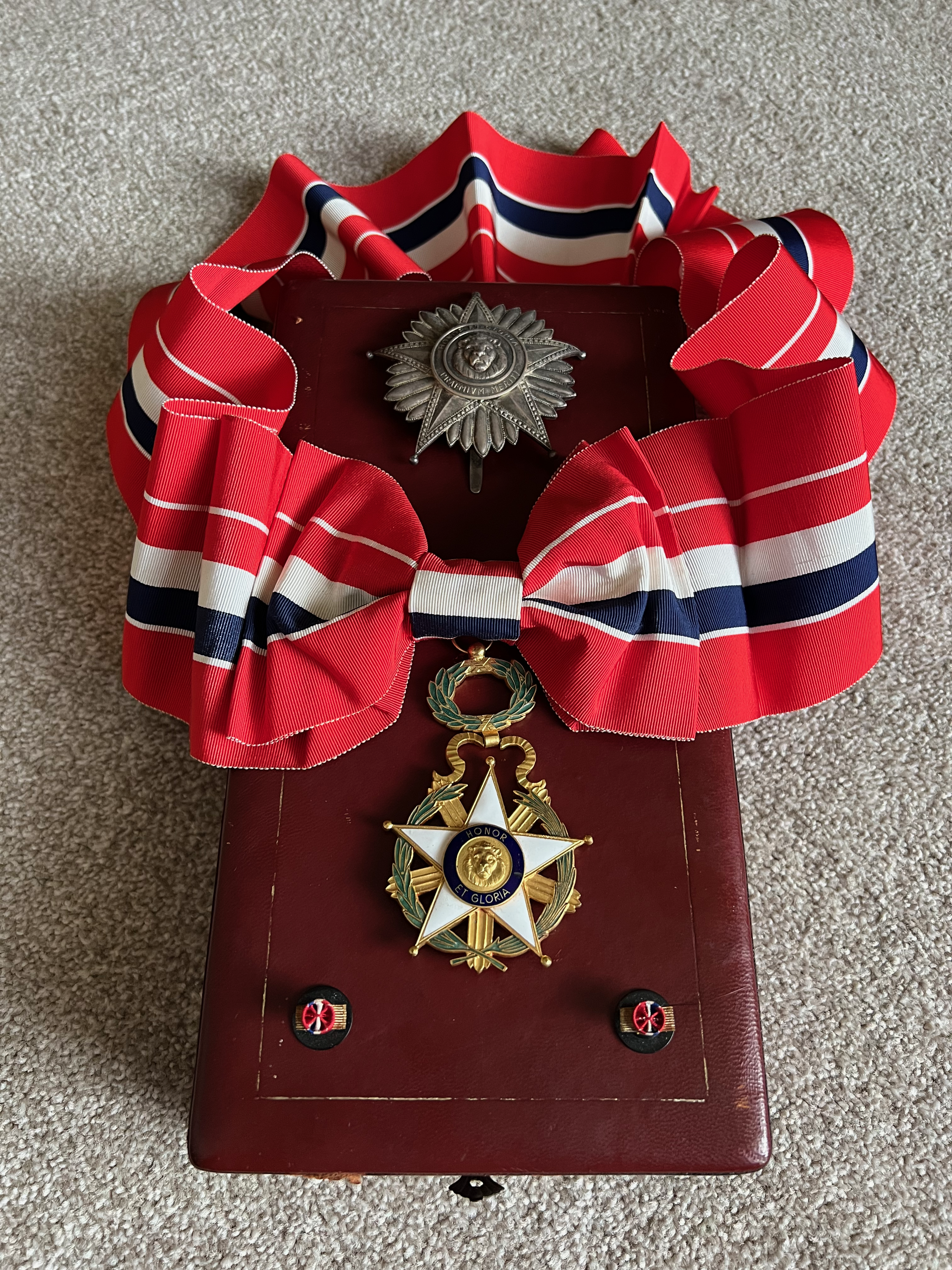
Set of insignia of the Grand Cross.

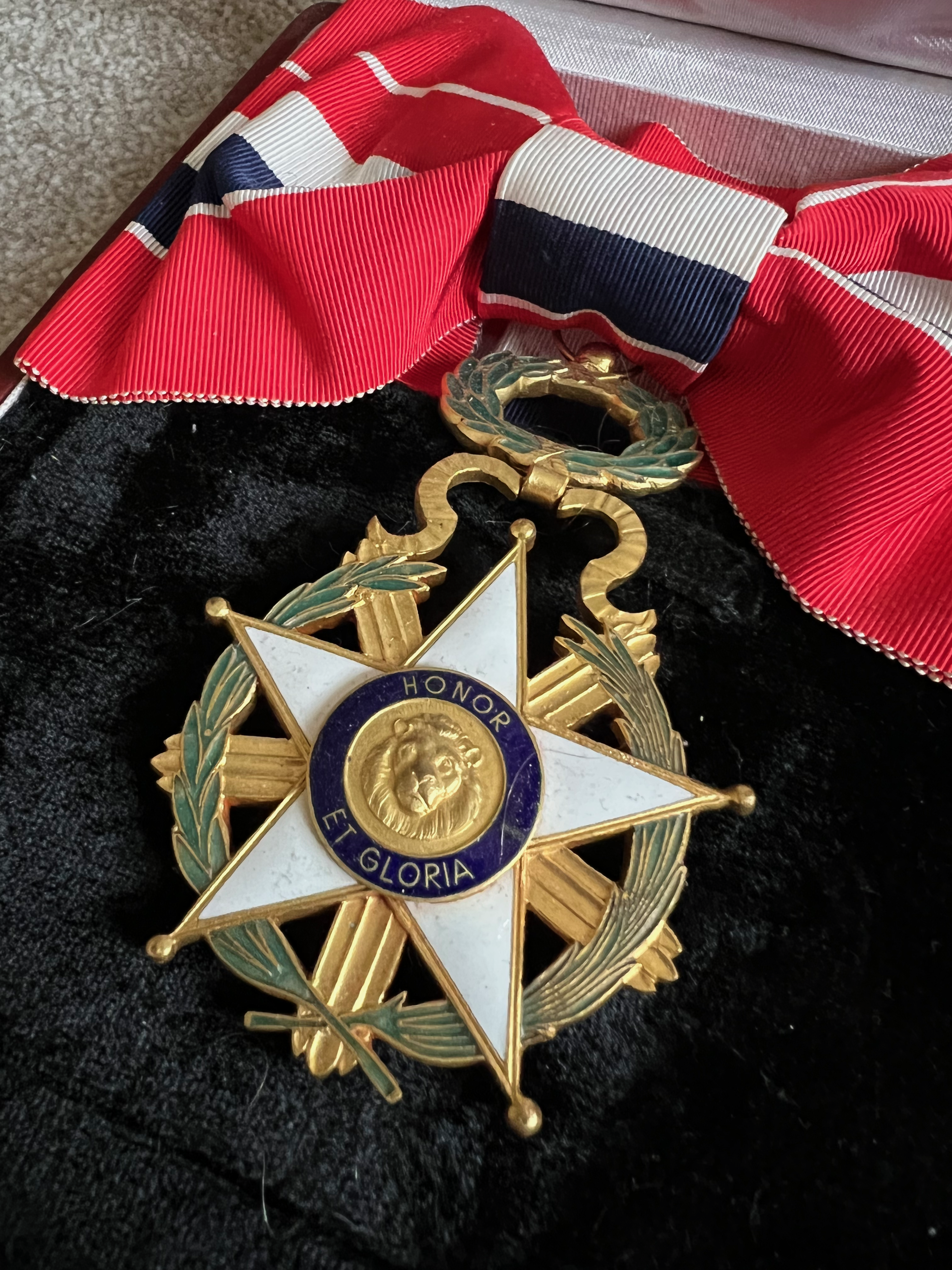
Grand Cross badge (obverse).

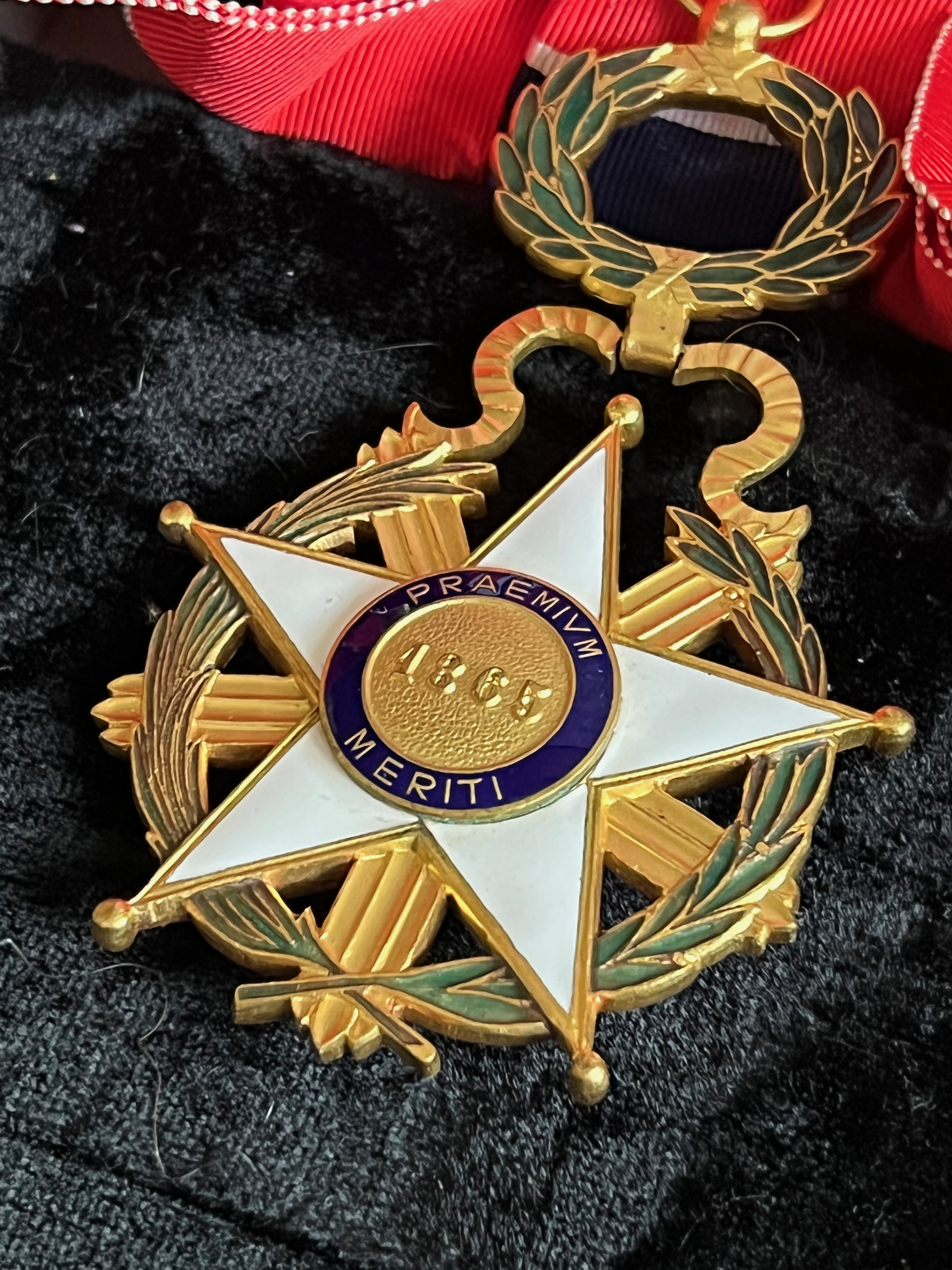
Grand Cross badge (reverse).

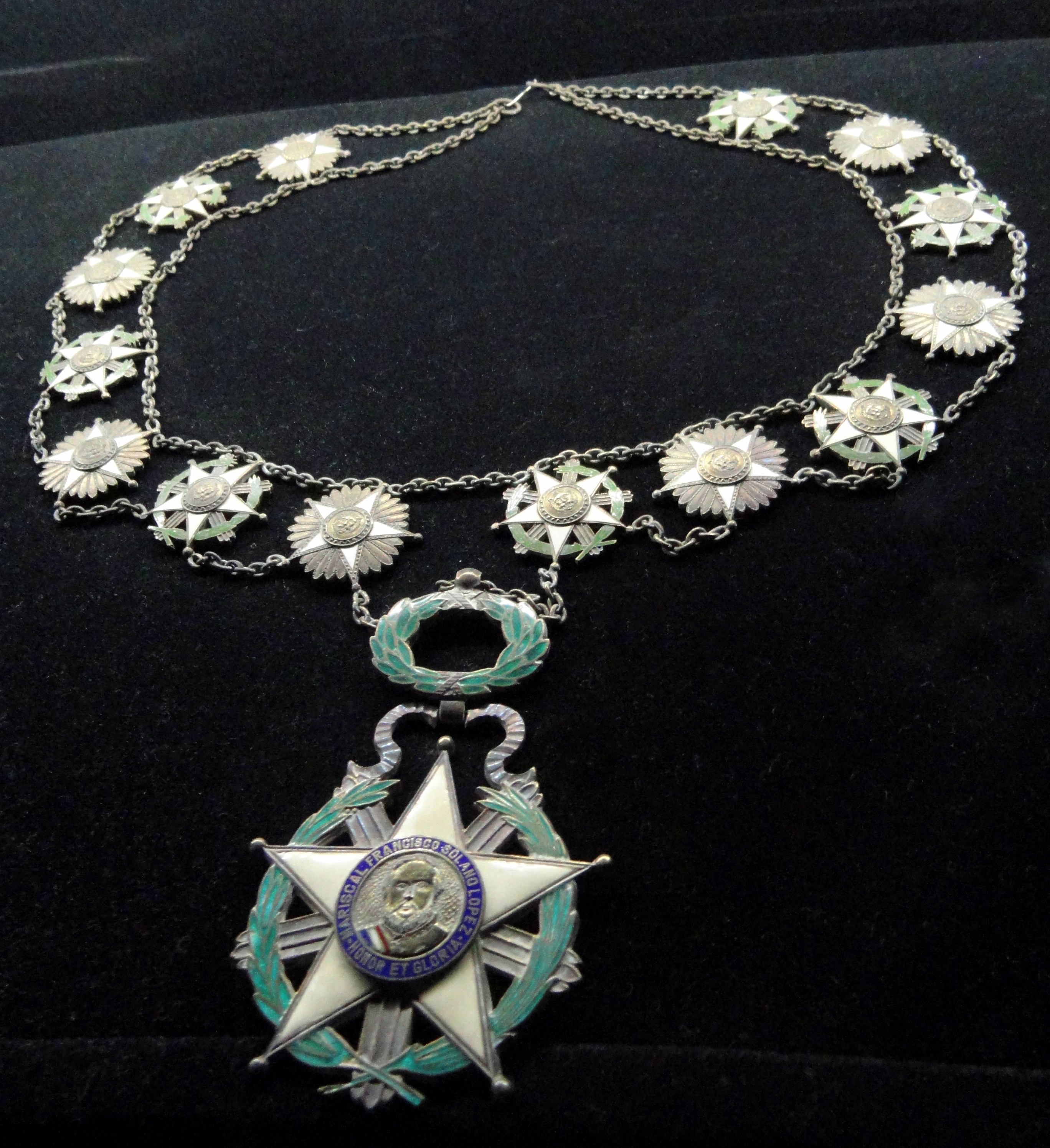
Collar of the order of Francisco Solano López.
