= Graziella Corvalán =

Paraguayan linguist and sociologist

- Born: Gilda Graciela Clementina Espínola Manzoni; 1 June 1931 (age 94); Asunción, Paraguay
- Other names: Graziella Espínola de Corvalán, Graziella Espínola Manzoni, Graziella Espínola Manzoni de Corvalán
- Occupations: Academic and women's rights activist

Graziella Corvalán (born 1931) is a Paraguayan sociologist and linguist most known for her efforts to preserve the Guarani language and for creation of one of the first women's studies programs in Paraguay. Her works stressed the need for public policies to eliminate discrimination on the basis of gender and language. She was recognized by the government of Paraguay in 2010 with the Grand Cross of the National Order of Merit. The following year, she was the recipient of the Serafina Dávalos Prize from the Municipal Board of Asunción and in 2022 was recognized by the United Nations Paraguay office.

== Early life and education ==
Gilda Graciela Clementina Espínola Manzoni was born on 1 June 1931, in Asunción, Paraguay to Estefana Consolación Manzoni and Pedro Ramón Cecilio Espínola. Her father was a lawyer, law professor, member of the Chamber of Deputies of Paraguay, and served on the board of directors of the Central Bank of Paraguay, until driven into exile in Buenos Aires in 1940. Espínola completed both her primary and secondary schooling in Argentina, before the family was able to return to Asunción in 1952. Upon her return to Paraguay, Espínola married and had six children: María Eugenia, Gustavo Vidal, Luis María, Silvana Casabianca, Javier, Male Oddone Corvalán Espínola. Professionally, from that point, she was known as Graziella Corvalán.

Corvalán taught English at local schools and the Centro Cultural Paraguayo Americano (Paraguayan-American Cultural Center), while attending the Universidad Nacional de Asunción, where she graduated with a degree in linguistics in 1970. During her studies, she attended the University of Texas at Austin, under a Fulbright Scholarship and earned a certificate to teach English as a second language in 1969. She went on to further her studies completing a post-graduate course in sociology at the Centro Paraguayo de Estudios Sociológicos (Paraguayan Center of Sociology Studies) of the Latin American Faculty of Social Sciences in 1972 and a post-graduate course in education at the Centro de Estudios Educativos (Center for Educational Studies) of the Universidad Iberoamericana in Mexico City in 1975.

== Career ==
From 1964, Corvalán taught at and served on the executive board of the Centro Paraguayo de Estudios Sociológicos (CPES, Paraguayan Center for Sociological Studies). That year, she also became the publisher of the Revista Paraguaya de Sociología (Paraguayan Journal of Sociology), a post she would hold until 2000. Corvalán became a professor and chair of the Sociology and Socio-linguistics at the Higher Institute of Languages, Universidad Nacional de Asunción (National University of Asunción) in 1977. She became a staunch ally of bilingual education and preservation of the Guarani language. She published works which demonstrated that although Guarani was an official language, along with Spanish, discrimination against Guarani-speakers prevailed in the country into the 21st century. She retained the chair until 2000 and through 2005 taught in the graduate program of gender development.

After attending the 1985 World Conference on Women in Nairobi, Kenya, Corvalán returned to Paraguay and founded with Mirtha Rivarola the Grupo de Estudios de la Mujer Paraguaya (GEMPA, Paraguayan Women's Studies Group) at the CEPS. The following year GEMPA founded Enfoques de Mujer (Women's Approaches), the first feminist journal in Paraguay, which published research regarding social movements and women's participation in society. Corvalán directed the journal until 1995. Along with Mabel Centurión, she published Bibliografía sobre estudios de la mujer en el Paraguay (Bibliography on Women's Studies in Paraguay) in 1987. It was the first such work in the country, and noted by Argentine sociologist María del Carmen Feijoó as a significant contribution to the field of women's studies.

Corvalán was the first Paraguayan women nominated to work with Convention on the Elimination of All Forms of Discrimination Against Women and participated in numerous women's conferences in Africa, Europe, and Canada, China, and the United States. Throughout 2008 and 2009, Corvalán served as the gender advisor to the Minister of the Secretariat for Women. She was honored with the Grand Cross of the National Order of Merit, presented by Héctor Lacognata, the Minister of Foreign Relations, and Gloria Rubin, the Minister for Women's Affairs in 2010. The following year, Corvalán was recognized by the Municipal Board of Asunción, which awarded her the Serafina Dávalos individual prize on International Women's Day, in recognition of her national and international work on improving laws and public policies regarding women in favor gender equality. In 2011, she became the director of the CPES. In 2022, she was recognized by the United Nations in Paraguay as one of the ten outstanding activists who had worked for women's rights in the country.

== Selected works ==
- Canese, Natalia; Corvalán, Graziella (1987). El español del Paraguay: en contacto con el guaraní [Paraguayan Spanish: In Contact with Guarani] (in Spanish). Asunción, Paraguay: Centro Paraguayo de Estudios Sociológicos. OCLC 948232913.
- Corvalán, Graziella; Rehnfeldt, Marilin (1989). Entre el silencio y la voz: mujeres—actoras y autoras de una sociedad en cambio [Between Silence and Voice: Women—Actors and Authors of a Changing Society] (in Spanish). Asunción, Paraguay: Centro Paraguayo de Estudios Sociológicos. OCLC 21764032.
- Guzmán, Virginia; Corvalán, Grazziella; Torres, Aída (2003). La institucionalidad de género en un contexto de cambio de gobierno : el caso de Paraguay [Gender Institutions in a Context of Government Change: The Case of Paraguay] (in Spanish). Santiago, Chile: Naciones Unidas, CEPAL, Unidad Mujer y Desarrollo. ISBN 978-92-1-322278-2.
- Corvalán, Graziella (January–July 2009). "El contexto sociocultural y la perspectiva de género en el bilinguismo paraguayo" [Socio-Cultural Context and Gender Perspective in Paraguayan Bilingualism]. Revista Paraguaya de Sociología (in Spanish). 46 (134). Asunción, Paraguay: Centro Paraguayo de Estudios Sociológicos. ISSN 0035-0354.
- Corvalán, Graziella (2013). Movimiento feminista paraguayo: su construcción social [Paraguayan Feminist Movement: Its Social Construction] (in Spanish). Asunción, Paraguay: Servilibro. ISBN 978-99953-0-512-3.
