= Brigadier Estanislao López Highway =

Highway in Argentina

Coordinates: 32°52′44″S 60°42′49″W

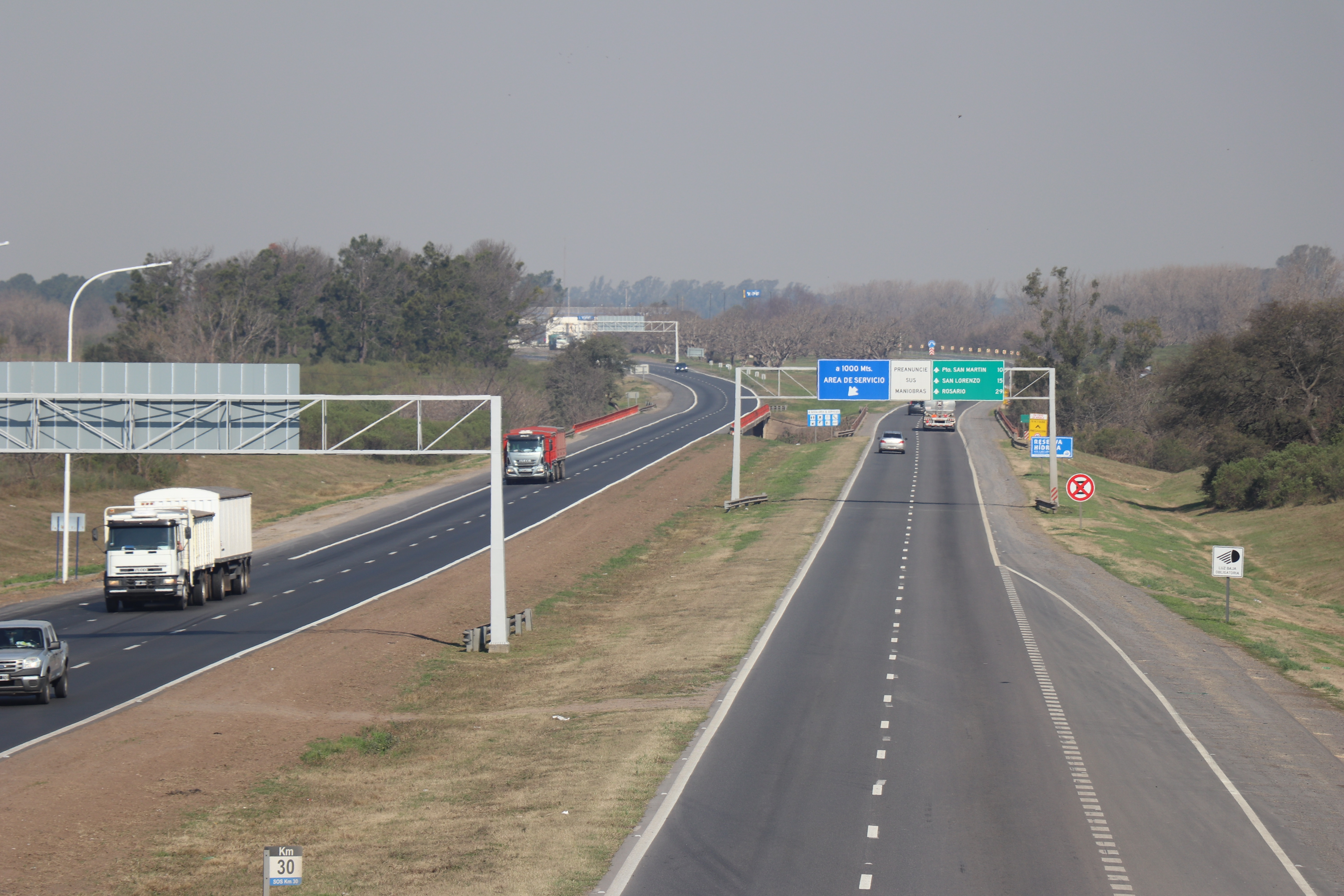
A 2018 view of the AP 01

The Brigadier Estanislao López Highway (AP 01) is a highway in the Argentine province of Santa Fe, linking the provincial capital Santa Fe and the city of Rosario. It runs north–south for 157 km (91 mi), roughly parallel to National Route 11.

Named in honor of the 19th century caudillo and governor, Estanislao López, the highway was initiated by the Provincial Highway Bureau office during the tenure of Governor Aldo Tessio, and was built between 1964 and 1972. Provincial Law Nº 10.798, signed by Governor Carlos Reutemann in 1993, privatized the highway's operations and maintenance, and redesignated it as a toll road under the management of AUFE.
