= Alberto Buela =

Argentine philosopher

- Born: 1946 (age 79–80); Buenos Aires, Argentina

Education
- Education: University of Buenos Aires (1972); Paris-Sorbonne University (MA, 1981; PhD, 1984)

Philosophical work
- Era: Contemporary philosophy
- Region: Western philosophy
- School: Continental philosophy
- Main interests: Ethics, history, metapolitics, nationalism, ontology, Peronism, philosophy of politics, philosophy of religion, theory
- Notable ideas: Metapolitics

Alberto Buela Lamas (born 1946) is an Argentine philosopher. Buela is professor at the National Technological University and the University of Barcelona and works as a researcher in the University of Barcelona. He is best known for his philosophical works on metapolitics, Aristotle and Peronism.

== Work ==
Alberto Buela was highly influenced by Latin American philosophers such as Gilberto Freyre, Saúl Taborda, and Julio Ycaza Tigerino. He also has listed as an influence the phenomenological work of Max Scheler, the existentialism of Martin Heidegger, Hegel, Aristotle (his main influence), and Carl Schmitt's practical theories.

His work has been based on phenomenology as a method and using the concepts exposed by Heidegger in his works.

Buela is an author of numerous books and articles about metapolitics, ontology, political philosophy, among other topics.

== Other media ==
Buela appeared as a special guest in a program by TLV1- Toda la verdad primero (a web series about conspiracy theories hosted by Juan Manuel Soaje Pinto) to debate history and politics.

== Bibliography ==
=== Books ===
- El sentido de América, Buenos Aires, Ed. Theoria, 1990
- Reto comunitario, Buenos Aires, 1995

=== Editor ===
- Honneth, Axel: El comunitarismo un debate sobre los fundamentos morales de las sociedades modernas, Ed.Campus Verlag, Frankfort, 1993
- Lipovetsky, Gilles: El crepúsculo del deber, Barcelona, Editorial Anagrama, 1994
- MacIntyre, Alasdair: Tras la virtud, Barcelona, Ed. Crítica, 1987
- Taylor, Charles: Ética de la autenticidad (English title: The Malaise of Modernity), Madrid-Bs. As., Ed. Paidós, 1994
- Walzer, Michael: Spheres of Justice, Oxford, Ed. Blackwell, 1983
