= Argentine Constitution of 1949 =

The Argentine Constitutional Reforms of 1949 were approved during Juan Domingo Perón's government. This new constitution was a major revision of the Constitution of Argentina. Its goal was to modernize and adapt the text to the twentieth century's concepts of democracy, with a bill of social rights, including better working conditions for the working class, right to education, etc. It also allowed for the indefinite reelection of the president.

It was suppressed by the military and civilian uprising known as Revolución Libertadora.

== Background ==
=== Social constitutionalism and second-generation rights ===
After 1930, several Argentine provinces reformed their constitutions to incorporate the new trends of social constitutionalism (San Juan, Entre Ríos, Buenos Aires, etc.), and calls to reform the Constitution of 1853 became increasingly frequent. In 1937, the Radical Civic Union resolved that it was necessary to reform the Constitution.

In 1931, a book by Rafael Emiliani appeared, titled Bases para la reforma de la Constitución Argentina. In 1936, Rómulo Amadeo published Hacia una nueva constitución nacional and in 1943 Roberto Podestá wrote Antecedentes y puntos de vista para una revisión constitucional.

Among the reform projects presented in the National Congress is that of convention delegate John William Cooke. He precisely explains the ideological foundations for state intervention in the economy that would inspire the 1949 reform:

The enormous financial concentrations—an inevitable result of the struggle for raw materials and markets—created conditions in which none of the assumptions on which liberal economic doctrine was based could be fulfilled. Faced with the growing power of large capitalist organizations with global reach, freedom became a myth, not only economically but also politically. This state of affairs—say the authors of the project—made state intervention in the economic life of nations necessary, both to prevent the exploitation of the weak and to facilitate the organic and balanced development of economic forces.

The creation of the International Labour Organization (ILO) in 1919, with a tripartite structure of governments, trade unions, and employers, and the statements in the preamble of its Constitution, of worldwide validity, were factors that strengthened workers' demands around the world to include social rights in national constitutions. Practically all constitutions in the world reorganized their texts to incorporate the rights and guarantees that characterized social constitutionalism and to reorganize the state to actively pursue those aims.

Social constitutionalism is a consequence of the Industrial Revolution, the emergence of the working class, and its organization into trade unions and workers' parties to demand specific labour rights. Social constitutionalism and the constitution of the welfare state that characterized the 20th century are inseparable processes. Labour law became the central axis of the welfare state. In the United States, the process was better known as the New Deal, a term that literally means "New Deal", but which is closer to the idea of a new social contract.

The core principle of social constitutionalism is social justice, understood as the need to go beyond purely formal declarations of human rights and to assign the state an active role to ensure that constitutional rights are effectively enjoyed by all citizens.

Social constitutionalism goes beyond the field of labour law to include economic, social, and cultural norms. Among the economic norms is the notion of the social function of property; among the social ones, specific guarantees concerning housing, health, social security, and old age; and among the cultural ones, the guarantee of free public education.

The Argentine Constitution of 1949 is part of a Latin American movement inspired by social justice. Some scholars have described these movements as "populism" because of their connection with the people, a term questioned by others for its pejorative meaning or for its Eurocentric generalization.

=== Debate over "total" or "present" members ===
One of the first debates was whether Congress should meet in joint assembly or whether each chamber should deliberate separately in declaring the need for reform, and whether the points to be reformed should be specified, even if the constitutional modification was total.

Regarding the interpretation of Article 30 of the Constitution of 1853–1860, particularly how the two-thirds majority should be calculated, since Article 30 did not clarify whether it referred to present or total members: one sector of the UCR argued that the constitutional requirement of two-thirds of Congress should be interpreted by adding the word "total" to the phrase "of its members" in the original article. Peronism and other opposition parties, however, maintained that Supreme Court rulings and constitutional precedents should be followed, since all reforms had been approved with two-thirds of the members present; the 1853 framers had not included the word "total", and therefore it was not the role of legislators to alter the meaning of the Constitution by adding requirements that did not exist in the original. This position held that the UCR argument lacked legal basis beyond attempting to obstruct legislative debate. On this issue, the UCR split between the Balbín faction, which supported the "total members" thesis, and the group of Moisés Lebensohn and Julio César Oyhanarte, which supported the "present members" thesis.

The interpretation of Article 30 had never been questioned: laws no. 234 of the Confederation (1860) and no. 171 (1866), declaring the need to reform the Constitution of 1860 and 1866 respectively, had been enacted with a two-thirds majority of "members present", not total members.

Peronism maintained that the constitutional requirement was two-thirds of the members present, as had been the case in the constitutional reforms of 1860 and 1866.

In the Radical Civic Union there were two opposing positions. On the one hand were the unionist radicals—José P. Tamborini, Enrique Mosca, Ernesto Sammartino, etc.—who maintained a strongly anti-Peronist stance and proposed an outright rejection both of the constitutional reform and of participation in elections. Another sector, including the intransigent radicals—Ricardo Balbín, Arturo Frondizi, Moisés Lebensohn, Crisólogo Larralde, Arturo Illia, Amadeo Sabattini, etc.—although opposed to Justicialism, expressed support for measures of social progress and economic nationalism, arguing that they should participate in elections and attend the sessions of the Constituent Convention. The radicals took part in elections and attended the first ordinary session. At the time the 1949 Constitution was enacted, the main opposition party, the Radical Civic Union, debated whether its representatives in Congress should swear allegiance to the 1949 Constitution or refuse to do so, as proposed by Miguel Ángel Zavala Ortiz. The head of the radical bloc, Ricardo Balbín, maintained that the UCR should swear to the 1949 Constitution; Balbín's position prevailed and the entire radical bloc took the oath to the 1949 Constitution.

The radicals argued that the phrase "two-thirds, at least, of its members" should be interpreted literally.

The debate between present and total members was never fully resolved. The approval of this rule by two-thirds of those present, according to Bidart Campos, fulfilled the requirement of a correct interpretation of Article 30 of the Fundamental Law, since it does not establish any special majority in its text, applying the Latin maxim "ubi lex non distinguit, nec nostrum est distinguere"—where the law does not distinguish, neither should we—so that approval by two-thirds of the quorum required by Article 56 was sufficient to meet the constitutional requirement. In 1994, the conservative deputy Francisco de Durañona y Vedia drafted a bill establishing that, to declare the need to amend the Constitution, two-thirds of the present members of the chambers of Congress would suffice; it obtained half approval in the Senate.

The Supreme Court accepted the legitimacy of the 1853 Constitution and, from 1949 onward, also the legitimacy of the 1949 reform, applying its provisions in various rulings.

== Constitutionalists ==
- Arturo Sampay, considered the "father of the Constitution of 1949"
- Domingo Mercante
- José Espejo
- Ítalo Luder
- Pablo A. Ramella
- Eduardo Colom
- Moisés Lebensohn
- A. Aráoz de Lamadrid
- Alfredo D. Calcagno
- R. Lascano

== The 1949 Constituent Convention ==
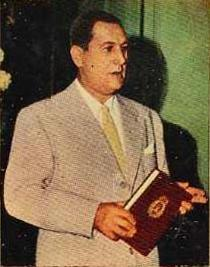
The president Juan Domingo Perón with the Constitution of Argentina of 1949.

=== Composition of the Convention ===
Among others, the following delegates participated:

Peronists:

- Arturo Sampay, jurist and constitutional scholar trained at the National University of La Plata, where he taught, with a social Christian background. Politically, he belonged to the group of Yrigoyenist radicals close to FORJA that in 1946 formed part of the Radical Civic Union Junta Renovadora, one of the parties that founded Peronism. A follower of the thought of Jacques Maritain, after the 1930 coup that overthrew the constitutional president Hipólito Yrigoyen, he became one of the main critics of the Constitution of 1853. In 1949 he himself presented the Justicialist Party with a draft that closely resembled the final reform. During the Constituent Convention he chaired the Constitutional Revision Commission and drafted the report read to the Convention on 8 March 1949. He is unanimously considered the ideologue or "father" of the 1949 Constitution. He authored works such as La crisis del Estado democrático liberal burgués (1942), Introducción a la Teoría del Estado (1951), and Constitución y Pueblo (1974).

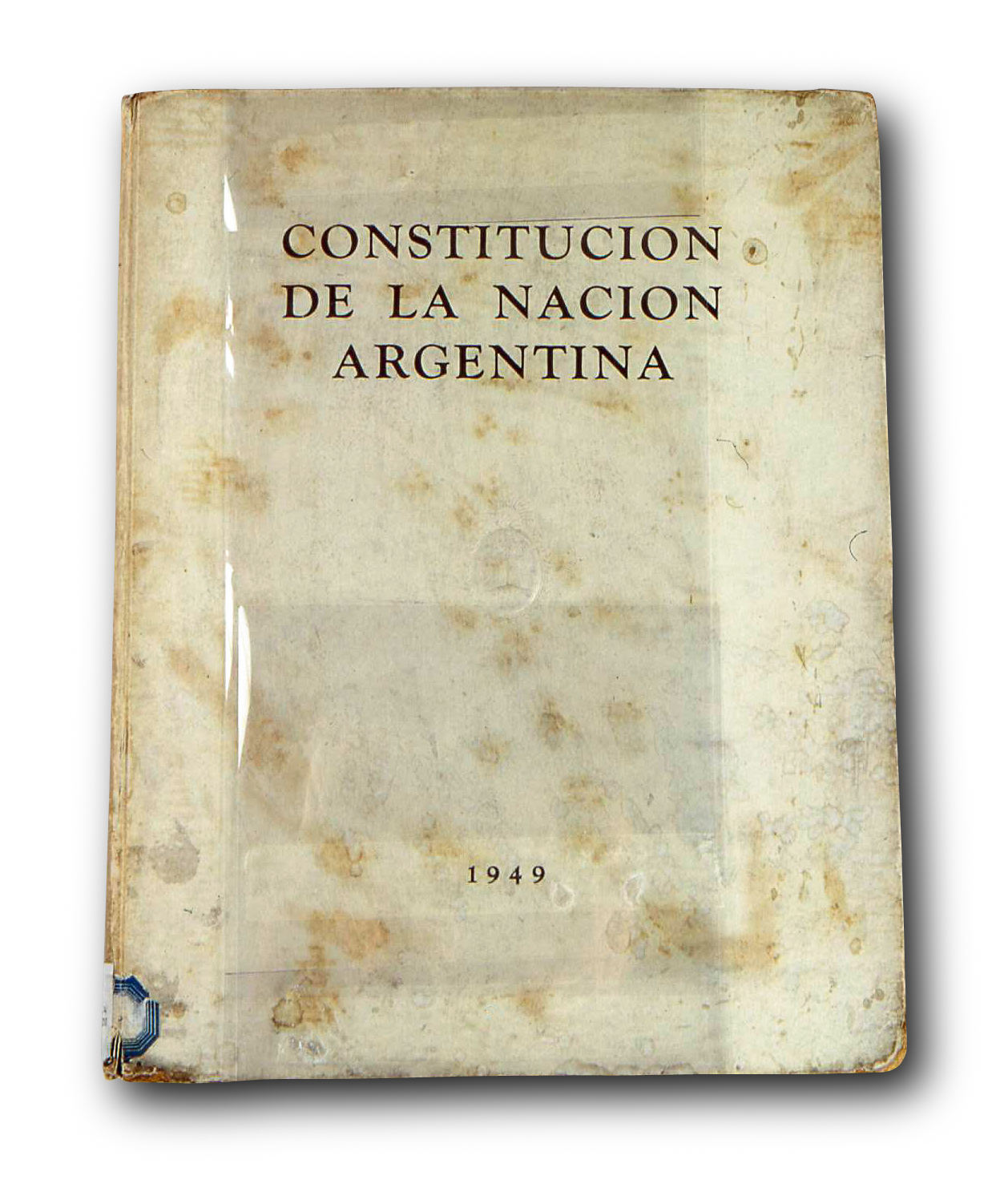
Copy of the Constitution of Argentina of 1949 exhibited at the Museo del Bicentenario.

- Domingo Mercante, a military officer and son of an important trade union railway leader of socialist background and former Secretary of Labor, who together with Perón designed the strategy of alliances with the labor movement in 1943.
- José Espejo, trade union leader, elected Secretary General of the CGT in 1947.
- Ítalo Luder, jurist, professor of constitutional law at the universities of Buenos Aires, Catholic, Litoral, and La Plata, later provisional President of the Nation in 1975. He wrote La Jurisprudencia (1951), El Sistema Jurídico de la Ejecución Penal (1959), La Argentina y sus Claves Geopolíticas (1974).
- Pablo A. Ramella (1906–1993), jurist and constitutionalist from San Juan, with a strong social Christian background. Rector of the Popular University of San Juan and dean of the Faculty of Law and Social Sciences of the Catholic University of Cuyo (1960–1969). Between 1955 and 1957 he was tried and convicted by the dictatorship known as the Revolución Libertadora, spending two years in prison. He was appointed a member of the Supreme Court of Argentina and removed by the dictatorship that took power in 1976. He authored one of the constitutional drafts considered by the Justicialist Party in preparing the party's proposal submitted to the convention. He wrote works such as Reformas a la Constitución de San Juan (1943), La Estructura del Estado (1946), Derecho Constitucional (1960), Introducción Elemental al Derecho (1967), El Desarrollo del Derecho Constitucional Argentino (1969), Los derechos humanos (1980), Atentados a la vida (1980), and La constitución al alcance de todos (1983).
- Eduardo Colom, director of the newspaper La Época.
- Francisco de Virgilio

Radicals:

- Moisés Lebensohn, politician and one of the renovators of the Radical Civic Union, part of the group that produced the Declaration of Avellaneda and founded the Movement of Intransigence and Renewal in 1945. He developed a nationalist thought inspired by Yrigoyen's government and adapted to industrialization and import substitution.
- Aristóbulo Aráoz de Lamadrid;
- Alfredo D. Calcagno;
- Ramón Lascano

==== List of members ====
The following is a full list of members of the 1949 Argentine constitutional convention:

National Constituent Convention (1949)
PRESIDENT:	Colonel (ret.) Domingo A. Mercante
1ST VICE PRESIDENT:	Héctor J. Cámpora
2ND VICE PRESIDENT:	José G. Espejo
SECRETARIES:	Mario M. Goizueta - Bernardino H. Garaguso
ASSISTANT SECRETARIES:	Leónidas Zavalla Carbó - Rafael V. González
DIRECTOR OF THE STENOGRAPHERS' CORPS:	Andrés J. Watson

DELEGATES	ELECTORAL DISTRICT
Albarracín, Ramón Héctor	San Juan
Albarracín Godoy, Jorge	Mendoza
Albisu, Juan Martín	Federal Capital
Alcorta, Víctor	Santiago del Estero
Aloé, Carlos Vicente	Buenos Aires
Alonso, Antonio	Córdoba
Álvarez Rodríguez, Justo Lucas	Buenos Aires
Aráoz de Lamadrid, Aristóbulo D.	Federal Capital
Arraya, Jorge F.	Córdoba
Ávalos Billinghurst, Román Amadeo	Corrientes
Avanza, Julio César	Buenos Aires
Bagnasco, Vicente	Buenos Aires
Bassó, Agustín M. A.	Santa Fe
Bayol, Augusto G.	Santa Fe
Beltrame, Felipe C.	Córdoba
Bernasconi, Mario	Federal Capital
Berraz Montyn, Carlos I.	Santa Fe
Bértora, José María	Entre Ríos
Borlenghi, Emilio	Federal Capital
Caesar, Juan Hugo	Santa Fe
Calcagno, Alfredo D.	Buenos Aires
Cámpora, Héctor J.	Buenos Aires
Candioti, Enrique A.	Santa Fe
Cané, Federico	Buenos Aires
Capdevilla, Pedro María	La Rioja
Carballido, Dorindo	Federal Capital
Carbó, Maximino	Corrientes
Carpio, Eliseo T.	Córdoba
Carvajal, Eduardo	Buenos Aires
Castro, Juan José	Jujuy
Castro, Rodolfo	Federal Capital
Celiz Díaz, César Octavio	Córdoba
Cobelli, Francisco T.	Santa Fe
Coloma, Julio	La Rioja
Conditi, Cecilio	Federal Capital
Correa, Carlos Heraclio	Catamarca
Cruz, Ireneo F.	Mendoza
Cuñarro, José E.	Buenos Aires
De la Vega, Juan Carlos	Santa Fe
Del Carril, Emilio Donato	Buenos Aires
Del Mazo, Gabriel	Buenos Aires
De Virgilio, Francisco	Córdoba
Díaz de Vivar, Joaquín	Corrientes
Doglioli, Ernesto A.	Santa Fe
Domeniconi, Julio J.	San Luis
Escobar Sáenz, Julio M.	Buenos Aires
Espeche, Leónidas	Santiago del Estero
Espejo, José Gregorio	Federal Capital
Esteves, Eduardo	Buenos Aires
Evans, Carlos Horacio	Mendoza
Fernández Jensen, Carlos A.	Santiago del Estero
Figueroa, Nerio Jorge	Federal Capital
Filippini, José A.	Buenos Aires
Forte, Clementino	Corrientes
Franceschini, Carlos Leonardo	Corrientes
Gallo, Luis M.	Santa Fe
Garaguso, Bernardino H.	Federal Capital
García, Alfredo	Tucumán
Gaulhiac, Eduardo	Federal Capital
Giardulli, Cayetano (h)	Buenos Aires
Giavarini, Alejandro B.	Santa Fe
Giménez, Rafael C.	Mendoza
Giménez, Teobaldo José	San Juan
Giovanelli, Agustín	Buenos Aires
Goizueta, Mario M.	Buenos Aires
González, Juan C.	Tucumán
Gordillo, Pedro N.	Córdoba
Grisolía, Gerónimo J.	Federal Capital
Iglesias, Roberto	Entre Ríos
Juárez, Carlos Arturo	Santiago del Estero
Laffitte, Julio M.	Buenos Aires
Lagos, César Mariano	Buenos Aires
Lescano, Carlos María	Federal Capital
Lescano, Ramón	Buenos Aires
Lasciar, Guillermo F.	Buenos Aires
Lavalle, Ricardo	Buenos Aires
Lebensohn, Moisés	Buenos Aires
Longhi, Luis Ricardo	Buenos Aires
López Carranza, Juan Luis	Tucumán
López Quintana, Antonio	Federal Capital
López Sansón, Ernesto	Federal Capital
Luco, Francisco R.	San Luis
Luder, Ítalo Argentino	Buenos Aires
Manubens Calvet, Reginaldo	Córdoba
Marianacci, Nicolás A.	Córdoba
Mariani, Anselmo A.	Buenos Aires
Márquez, Carlos A.	Tucumán
Martín, Antonio	Santa Fe
Martínez Casas, Mario	Córdoba
Martini, Oscar Salvador	Federal Capital
Maturo, Domingo	Santa Fe
Maxud, Alfredo D.	Tucumán
Maya, Carlos María	Entre Ríos
Medina, Ramón A.	Santiago del Estero
Mendé, Raúl Antonio	Santa Fe
Méndez San Martín, Armando	Federal Capital
Mendiolaza, Nicomedes	Salta
Mercader, Amílcar A.	Buenos Aires
Mercante, Domingo A.	Buenos Aires
Miel Asquía, Ángel J.	Federal Capital
Navarro, Eduardo José	Entre Ríos
Nazar, Félix Antonio	Catamarca
Nicolini, Oscar L. M.	Federal Capital
Otero, Leoncio V.	Entre Ríos
Otero, Manuel	Buenos Aires
Ottonello, Benito J.	Buenos Aires
Páez, Juan L.	San Luis
Palacios Hidalgo, Ignacio	Córdoba
Paladino, Miguel Ángel	Buenos Aires
Palero Infante, Rubén	Mendoza
Parente, Miguel A.	Entre Ríos
Parera, Francisco	Buenos Aires
Parodi Grimaux, Misael J.	Entre Ríos
Parry, Adolfo E.	Federal Capital
Passerini, José Luis	Buenos Aires
Peluffo, Domingo	Federal Capital
Perazzolo, Juan José	Federal Capital
Pérez, Felipe Santiago	Tucumán
Pérez Aznar, Ataulfo	Buenos Aires
Pessagno, Atilio	Federal Capital
Pinto Bazán, Julián A.	Santiago del Estero
Policicchio, Roque V. (h)	Federal Capital
Pontieri, Félix A.	Buenos Aires
Pueyrredón, Horacio Honorio	Buenos Aires
Quinteros Luques, José	Buenos Aires
Racedo, Lucio E.	Federal Capital
Ramella, Pablo A.	San Juan
Ramos, Eduardo	Salta
Rivarola, Lorenzo O.	Tucumán
Robledo, Ángel F.	Santa Fe
Rodríguez Jáuregui, Eugenio	Entre Ríos
Roibon, P. Valentín	Corrientes
Roulet, Enrique A.	Santa Fe
Salvo, Hilario F.	Federal Capital
Sampay, Arturo Enrique	Buenos Aires
Saponaro, José F.	Federal Capital
Seeber, Carlos M.	Buenos Aires
Simini, Jorge Alberto	Buenos Aires
Sobral, Antonio	Córdoba
Solveyra Casares, Guillermo	Buenos Aires
Spachessi, Modesto A. E.	Córdoba
Spota, Alberto Antonio	Federal Capital
Susán, José C.	Santa Fe
Sylvestre Begnis, Carlos	Santa Fe
Tanco, Miguel Aníbal	Jujuy
Teisaire, Alberto	Federal Capital
Torre, Eduardo	Santa Fe
Turano, Armando L.	Federal Capital
Valenzuela, Rodolfo Guillermo	Federal Capital
Vela, Alejandro Octavio	Entre Ríos
Vila Vidal, Eduardo Oscar	Mendoza
Villada, Julio César J.	Santa Fe
Villar, Justo Policarpo	Corrientes
Visca, José Emilio	Buenos Aires
Waite Figueroa, Manuel Alberto	Córdoba
Yáñez, Robustiano	Salta

ELECTED DELEGATE NOT SEATED	ELECTORAL DISTRICT
López, Pablo E. C.	Federal Capital

== The reforms ==
=== Summary ===
The Argentine Constitution of 1949 was part of the social constitutionalism current, incorporating workers' rights (the worker's decalogue), the rights of the family, of old age, of education and culture; state protection for science and art; and compulsory, free primary education. It also established equality between men and women in family relations, university autonomy, the social function of property, direct election of deputies, senators, and the president, and immediate presidential re-election.

A large number of rights and guarantees related to social and economic progress were incorporated, including:

The right of assembly (art. 26) The prohibition of racial discrimination (art. 28) Workers' rights (art. 37, I) Legal equality of men and women in marriage (art. 37, II) The family homestead (art. 37, II) Shared parental authority (art. 37, II) Rights of old age (art. 37, III) Compulsory and free primary education (art. 37, IV) University autonomy (art. 37, IV) The social function of property (art. 38) State control of foreign trade (art. 40) Nationalization of mineral and energy resources (art. 40) State ownership of public services (art. 40) Direct suffrage (arts. 42, 47, and 82)

=== Additions to the preamble ===
The Constitution of 1949 incorporated the following phrase into the preamble:

- "Economically free": this refers to the idea of economic independence and indirectly to the mechanisms of neocolonial dependency.

=== Form of government and political declarations ===
The Constitution of 1949 incorporated two provisions related to the country's political organization:

- Defense of democracy and the Constitution: Article 15 established the principle that there is no freedom to attack freedom, the prohibition of forming non-state militias, and the non-recognition of organizations that attacked democracy or the liberties of the Constitution. In addition, Article 21 ordered Congress to pass a law criminally punishing those who advocated or disseminated methods or systems by which, through the use of violence, they proposed to suppress or change the Constitution or any of its basic principles; and Articles 34 and 83, subsection 19, empowered the National Executive Power to decree a "state of prevention and alarm", during which it was authorized to detain people for up to 30 days. Ítalo Lúder justified these provisions on the need to reconcile order and freedom, calling it "militant democracy".
- Security on rivers: Article 18 limited freedom of navigation on the country's internal rivers in cases in which "national security or welfare" could be affected. Free navigation on internal rivers, established in the Constitution of 1853, was one of the key issues in the civil wars and military conflicts with Great Britain and France in the first half of the 19th century. The reform aimed to open the way to the repression of smuggling, which had spread, and ultimately to establish transit duties.

=== Organization of the administration of justice ===
It also established reforms in the administration of justice:

- Trial by jury: The constitutional reform eliminated the jury trial system established by Article 24 of the Constitution of 1853, which had not yet been applied; despite the constitutional prescription, until then there was broad consensus among specialists and political parties that it was not a suitable system for the country. In fact, when the Constitution of 1853 was restored in 1955, none of the successive governments complied with the mandate. The constitutional reform of 1994 confirmed the obligation to organize the Argentine judicial system through the jury system, and from 2004 onward it was established in the provinces of Buenos Aires, Córdoba, Chaco, Entre Ríos, Mendoza, San Juan, Río Negro, Chubut, and Neuquén, and in the city of Buenos Aires.
- Military jurisdiction: In Article 29 (formerly 18), the original text was supplemented by stating that "military personnel and persons assimilated to them shall be subject to military jurisdiction in the cases established by law" and subjecting "persons who commit offenses punishable under the Code of Military Justice and submitted by law itself to military courts".

=== Social rights ===
Women's rights
The declaration of legal equality between men and women in marriage and joint parental authority, established by Article 37 of the Constitution of 1949, was one of its most notable provisions, since until then it had not been legally established. When the Constitution of 1949 was repealed, married women in Argentina once again had an inferior status for several more decades. Until 1968, married women were considered relatively legally incapable, similar to minors, and only in 1985 was their legal equality with men regarding parental authority over their children established.

The convention discussed whether the right to strike should be included in the Constitution. Sampay opposed this, stating that the right to strike was a natural right that did not need to be incorporated into positive law, as did fellow Peronist delegate Hilario Salvo, who argued that its inclusion "brings anarchy and casts doubt on whether, from now on, our country will be socially just". The Justicialist delegate Pablo A. Ramella argued in favor of inclusion.

=== Economic rights ===
Article 40
Article 40 has been regarded by some observers as the core of the 1949 reform and the real cause of its repeal in 1956. Article 40 was imposed by the center-left and trade union wing of Peronism, resisting pressure from conservative sectors, the big business lobby, and probably from President Perón himself.

Chapter IV, added to the Constitution by the 1949 reform, was titled "The social function of property, capital, and economic activity". It had three articles: Article 40 generated a crucial conflict, both during and after the reform. Drafted by Sampay, Juan Sabato, and Jorge del Río, who had been key figures in the struggle against the private monopoly of electric service and the corruption of the companies providing the service, which triggered the so-called CHADE scandal.

Article 40 guaranteed decisive state control of the economy in the fields of energy, public services, and foreign trade, as well as in sectors in which private monopolies or oligopolies operated. It also established a mechanism for calculating the expropriation price of companies administering public services, counting against it "surpluses over a reasonable profit".

Explaining the rationale behind his constitutional theory on production goods and natural resources, Sampay stated in a lecture delivered in the early 1970s:

Faced with the reality of multinational companies and the imperialism they exercise by using the power of highly developed states, the principle of sovereignty promotes and conditions the essential progress of contemporary international law. Far from being archaic, therefore, the principle of sovereignty has decisive force for maintaining peace and promoting the progress of peoples.

— Arturo Sampay

Several historians maintain that foreign companies exerted pressure so that the proposed article would not be included in the Constitution, even obtaining an attempt by Perón himself to prevent the Constituent Convention from approving Article 40, but that Sampay prevented this. In some cases, that conflict is also attributed, at least partially, to the persecution that the Peronist government began three years later against Sampay and that led him into exile.

When the military dictatorship that overthrew the constitutional government in 1955 "proclaimed" the abolition of the Constitution of 1949, Raúl Scalabrini Ortiz, in an article titled "Article 40 Is the Bastion of the Republic", argued that the sole reason for abolishing the so-called Peronist Constitution was to repeal Article 40.

Sampay recounts in his book Constitución y pueblo that "political parties with popular roots" attempted to reinstate Article 40 during the 1957 Constituent Convention convened by the dictatorship, but when "the initiative gained the support of the majority of the drafting committee... the Convention dissolved in an instant".

Article 40 was used as a precedent by Uruguay in 1967 and by Chile in 1971 to establish rules on the expropriation of companies and the nationalization of public services.

== Repeal and historical consequences ==
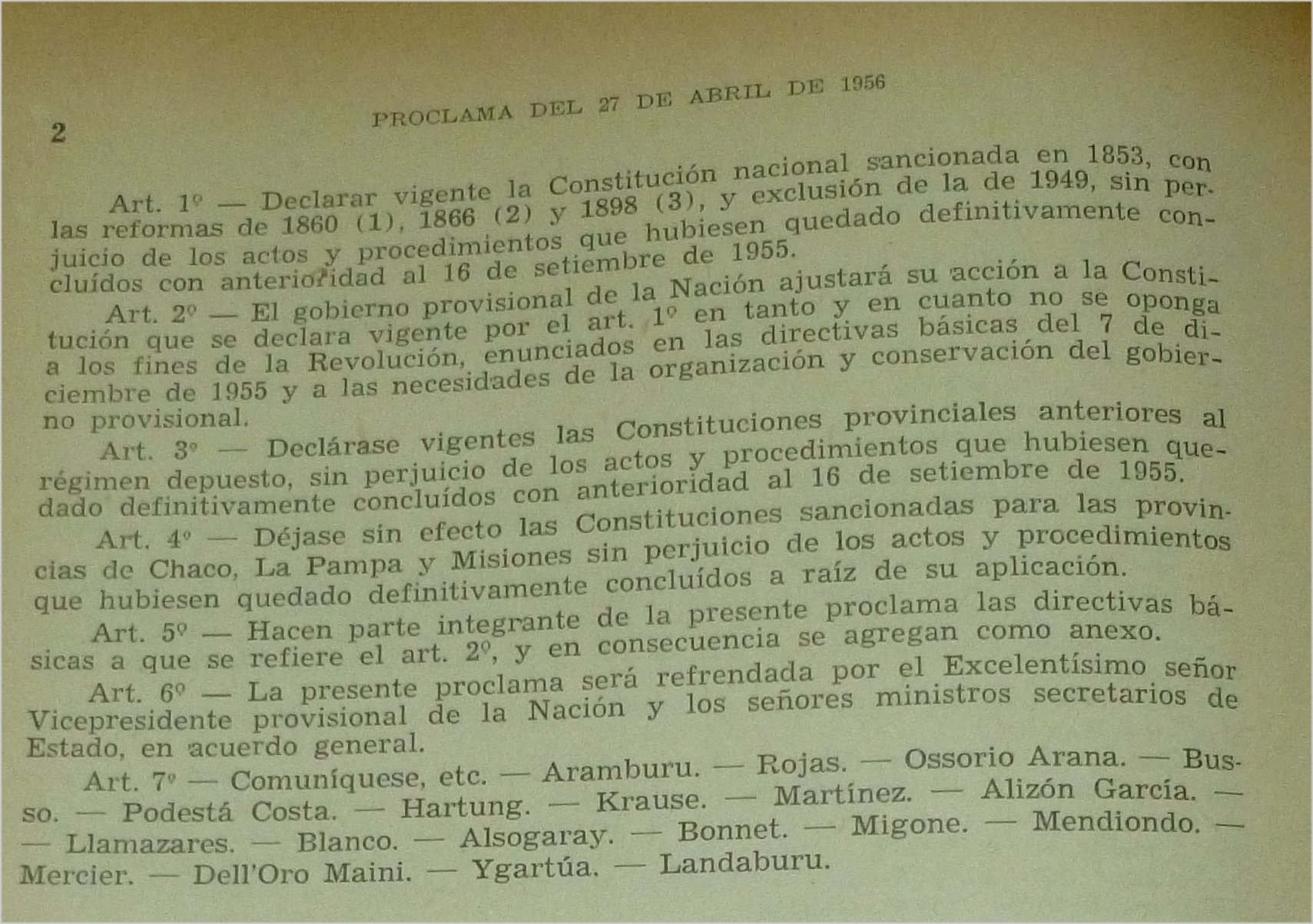
Proclamation of 27 April 1956 (operative part).

After the September 1955 coup d'état in Argentina (Revolución Libertadora), the military junta ordered the closure of the National Congress, the removal of the members of the Supreme Court and of provincial, municipal, and university authorities, and also placed the entire judiciary "in commission". The Constitution was repealed by a military proclamation dated 27 April 1956, invoking the "exercise of revolutionary powers", signed by dictator Pedro Eugenio Aramburu and other persons usurping positions of power.

At the end of the Constituent Convention of 1957, and already without a quorum, the socialist delegate Alfredo Palacios spoke the following words:

Those who have left will be responsible before the people and before history. For today, the repudiation of this Assembly and of their own colleagues is enough; a terrible repudiation, Mr. President.

== Assessments and characterizations ==
For Germán Bidart Campos, it "sought to restore the identity between practice and the written constitution, giving a statute consistent with the new doctrine defended by the head of state".

Within the current of negative assessment of the Argentine Constitution of 1949, Gabriel Negretto considers it an archetype of constitutional populism in Latin America.

Luis Oviedo of the Workers' Party, of Trotskyist ideology, also expressed a negative assessment, describing it as "the codification of bourgeois nationalism", clerical and historically ineffective. According to Oviedo, Article 32 also constituted an "ideological regimentation of state workers".

Conversely, jurist Eugenio Zaffaroni, former justice of the Supreme Court, carried out an extensive analysis praising the Constitution of 1949 as part of "a generous constitutionalism as a project for a better humanity" and harshly criticized the violence unleashed by the Revolución Libertadora for having wanted to "erase it from history. The sin did not consist in criticizing or objecting to it, but in seeking to erase it. For the first time in national history, a decree issued in the exercise of supposed revolutionary powers repealed a national Constitution and provincial constitutions, far exceeding its merely factual meaning to acquire the dimension of an attempt to break time. Other aberrations had been committed—and not few—but this one transcends its own immediate scope and casts its ominous shadow over the following decades".

The rector of the National University of Tres de Febrero and Peronist politician Eduardo Jozami analyzes in detail the social and economic advances of the Constitution of 1949, such as the social function of property, social justice, the prohibition of abuse of rights, the rights of workers, the family, old age, education, and culture, and questions its annulment "behind the people's back... by a 1956 decree-law of the government of the 'Revolución Libertadora' (which) annulled the constitution (which had received the massive approval of the people), restoring the validity of that of 1853" and "legalized Argentine dependency on international centers".

Confirming the progressive content of the Constitution of 1949, jurist and 1994 constituent convention delegate for the Socialist Party Guillermo Estévez Boero (1930–2000) emphasized the need for the Constitution and the law to be democratic and to express the interests of the people and not those of minorities represented by "specialists in constitutional law", calling on citizens to participate in constitutional reforms by presenting "projects, the unions, the neighborhood organizations, which can take as a basis the Constitution of 1949, the most advanced our homeland has known to date".

Raúl Scalabrini Ortiz wrote an article in 1956 titled "Article 40 Is the Bastion of the Republic", in which he denounced the dictatorship's intention to repeal the Constitution of 1949 and "leave the country in a state of horde". In that article, Scalabrini argued that the real reason for the dictatorship to repeal the Constitution was Article 40, even though none of its authorities mentioned that reason in their statements: "Article 40 is a true wall that defends us from foreign advances and is hindering and delaying the planned subjugation and indebtedness of the Argentine economy... The hidden issue lies in Article 40".

Constitutionalist Roberto Lopresti defined the Constitution of 1949 as "the highest legal institute produced by the representation of the people in Argentina", repealed by a "coup de force of the anti-homeland";

Jurist Francisco Pestanha considers that "the constitutional reform of 1949 came to promote a Copernican change";

Sociologist Aritz Recalde considers that the Constitution of 1949 "translated into the country's institutional order the aspirations of the free organizations of the people, which were silenced and persecuted for decades", also emphasizing the totalitarian decision of the military dictatorship to repeal it by proclamation, unleashing in the following decades a degree of violence that nearly reached "civil war" and generated a society with deep inequalities.

Constitutionalist Daniel M. Rudi emphasizes social justice in assessing that "the arsenal of historical rights of working men and women gathered by the constitutional code of 1949 is a corollary of the general principle of social justice".

== Bibliography ==
- CARNOTA, Walter (2001). Curso de Derecho Constitucional [Course of Constitutional Law]. Buenos Aires: La Ley.
- LÚDER, Ítalo A. (1949). El principio democrático en la Constitución [The Democratic Principle in the Constitution]. La Plata: Biblioteca Laboremus.
- PALACIOS, Alfredo (1958). El pensamiento socialista en la Convención Nacional de 1957 [Socialist Thought in the 1957 National Convention]. Buenos Aires.
- RAJLAND, Beatriz (1999). "Los valores del constitucionalismo social" [The Values of Social Constitutionalism]. Los valores en la Constitución Argentina [Values in the Argentine Constitution]. Buenos Aires: Ediar. ISBN 950-574-126-X.
- SAMPAY, Arturo E. (1974). Constitución y Pueblo [Constitution and People]. Buenos Aires: Cuenca.
- LOPRESTI, Roberto P. (1998). Constitución Argentina Comentada [Annotated Argentine Constitution]. Buenos Aires: Unilat. ISBN 987-96049-3-8.
- SANTOS MARTÍNEZ, Pedro (1976). "La Constitución "justicialista"" [The "Justicialist" Constitution]. La nueva argentina [The New Argentina]. Buenos Aires: La Bastilla.
- SEGOVIA, Juan Fernando (2005). El peronismo y la Constitución de 1949 en la crisis de legitimidad argentina [Peronism and the 1949 Constitution in the Argentine Legitimacy Crisis]. Vol. Anales. Academia Nacional de Ciencias Morales y Políticas. (Artículo completo) consultado 29-abr-2006.
- VANOSSI, Jorge Reinaldo (1994). El Estado de Derecho en el Constitucionalismo Social [The Rule of Law in Social Constitutionalism]. Buenos Aires: EUDEBA.
- VANOSSI, Jorge Reinaldo (2005). La Constitución Nacional de 1949 [The National Constitution of 1949]. Vol. Anales. Academia Nacional de Ciencias Morales y Políticas. (Artículo completo) consultado 29-abr-2006.
- TERROBA, Luis Alberto. La Constituciòn de 1949. Una Causa Nacional [The 1949 Constitution: A National Cause]. Ediciones del Pilar (2003-Sold out); Editorial Ross (2nd. Ed. 2010).
