= Victorino Abente y Lago =

Paraguayan poet

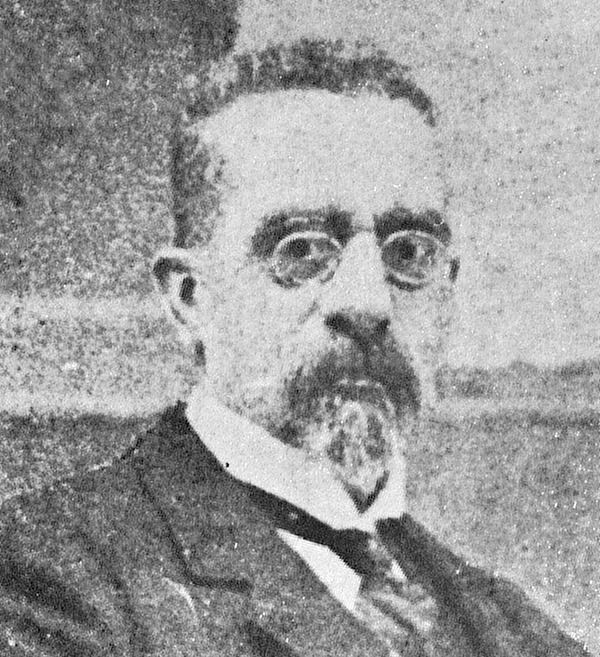
- Victorino Abente y Lago
- Born: Victorino Juan Ramón Abente y Lago; June 2, 1846; Muxía, Spain
- Died: December 22, 1935 (aged 89); Asunción, Paraguay
- Known for: Poet
- Notable work: La tejedora de Ñandutí, El Salto del Guairá

Victorino Abente y Lago (June 2, 1846 in Muxía, Spain – December 22, 1935 in Asunción, Paraguay) was a Paraguayan poet. He went to Paraguay when resentments of the Paraguayan War (1864–1870) were still fresh. In spite of being Galician, his life and work identifies the Paraguay since the very moment of his arrival in March 1869, when the Brazilian and Argentine troops occupied the country.

== First steps ==
He was related to the second stage of Paraguayan romanticism that began after the War Against the Triple Alliance, and even with post-romanticism. Also collaborated with many journals of the capital, where he published many of his own poems. His poems were dedicated to the renaissance of the nation, being properly known as the "poet of the national resurrection". A few months before his decease could watch his country victorious in the war against Bolivia between 1932 and 1935.

== Career ==
His poems, spread in many journals and magazines of his time, were recompiled and published after his decease in Asunción by his grandson Cándido Samaniego Abente in a book entitled Poetic Anthology: 1867-1926, in 1984.

About his work, Ignacio A. Pane wrote: "He sang the most beautiful, passionate, enthusiastic and poetic song in just one word that until now writers and teachers have been directing the Paraguay... Taken by the wings of his own inspiration he made that the 'Paraguayan Sibyl' stood firm and tended the pointer finger of the prophet to show him the Promised Land..."

== Last years ==
Married with Isabel Miskowsky, Victorino Juan Ramón Abente y Lago deceased in Asunción, December 22, 1935.
