= Otuke language =

Extinct language of Brazil

Otuke
- Otuque
- Native to: Brazil, Bolivia
- Region: Mato Grosso; Santa Cruz
- Ethnicity: Otuke
- Extinct: after 1831
- Language family: Macro-Jê ?: Bororoan; Otuke–Covareca–Kuruminaka; Otuke

Language codes
- ISO 639-3: otu
- Glottolog: otuk1240

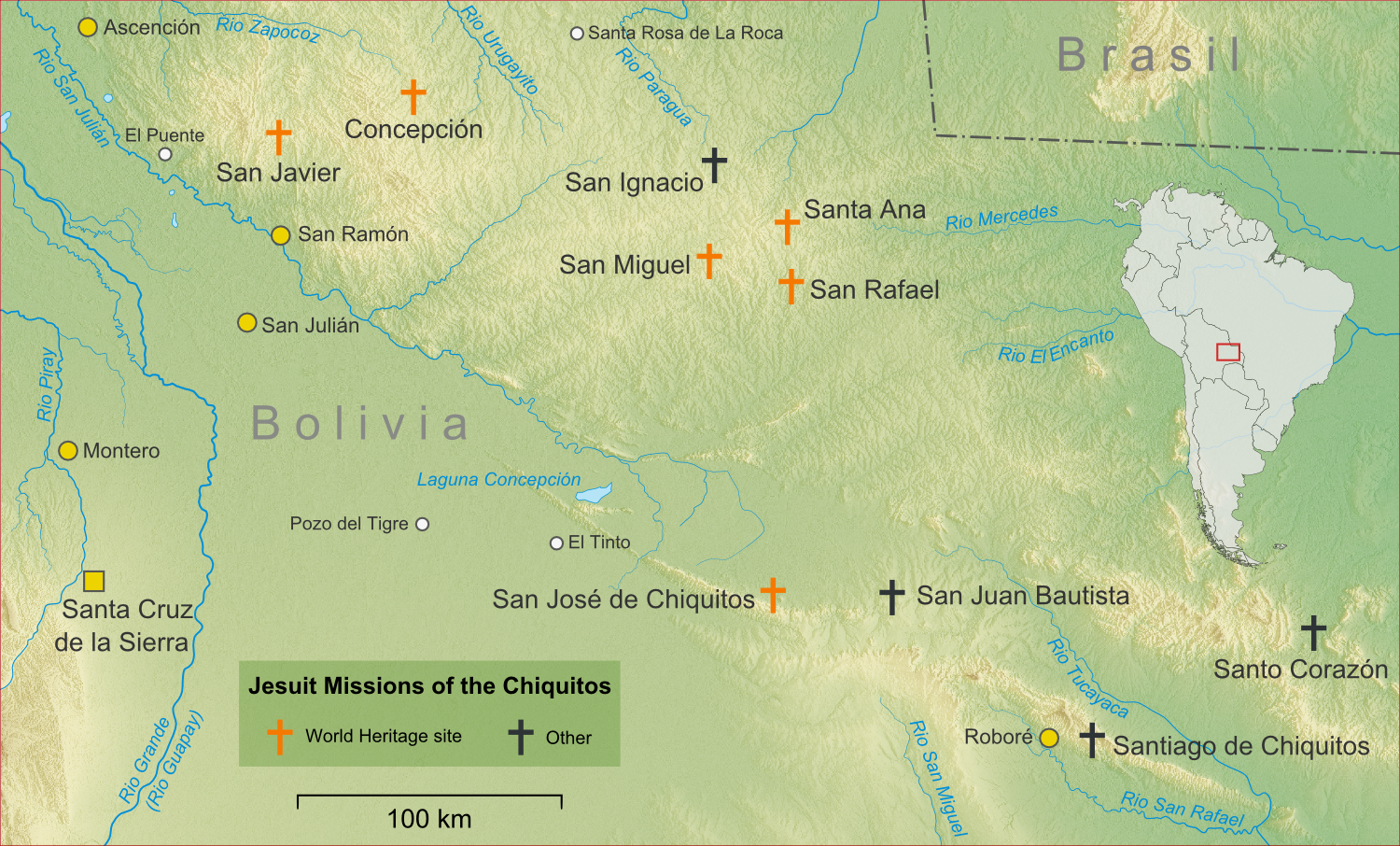
Locations of the Jesuit Missions of Chiquitos with present international borders

Otuke (Otuque, Otuqui; Ayoreo: Louširu) is an extinct language of the Bororoan language family, formerly spoken in Brazil and Bolivia. Its closest relatives, the Kovareka (Covareca) and Kuruminaka (Curuminaca) languages, both extinct and poorly known, have sometimes been considered dialects of it.

== History ==
The name Otuqui was first mentioned in a 1726 book by Jesuit priest Juan Patricio Fernández, listing the names of various rancherías in the region inhabitedd by the Chiquito (Chiquitano) people, including the ranchería of Otuquimaaca. However, the connection with the Otuke people and language is unclear. A more evident connection to Otuke was made by Lorenzo Hervás's 1784 book Catalogo delle lingue conosciute. In 1838, Georg Ludwig Kriegk also mentioned the Otuquis Province in his book Das Land Otuquis in Bolivia based on reports by its secretary at the time, Moritz Bach. An extract in the Chiquitano language of the region was also given, which Kriegk thought incorrectly to be an attestation of Otuke.

=== Documentation ===
The only contemporaneous documentation of Otuke was done by Alcide d'Orbigny in 1831. At the time of his visit, the Otukes lived in the Jesuit mission of Santo Corazón, one of the Jesuit Missions of Chiquitos. By then, only two elderly people could speak the original Otuke language, and the rest had all switched to Chiquitano.

== Name ==
Combès (2012) suggests that -toki ~ -tuki ~ -tuke (also present in the ethynonym Gorgotoqui) is likely related to the Bororo animate plural suffix -doge (i.e., used to form plural nouns for ethnic groups). Hence, the name Otuqui (Otuke) was likely etymologically related to the name Gorgotoqui.

== Classification ==
d'Orbigny compared his vocabulary of Otuke with those of the Saraveca and Chiquitano languages, finding that they hardly had any similarities, though the minuscule vocabularies collected of Kovareka and Kuruminaka were similar. The first to propose a relationship between Otuke and Bororo was Karl von den Steinen (1895). Several attested extinct Bororoan varieties were either dialects of Otuke or closely related:

- Covareca - Santa Ana mission, Bolivia
- Curuminaca - Casalvasco mission, Bolivia
- Coraveca (Curave, Ecorabe) - Santo Corazón mission, Bolivia (unattested)
- Curucaneca (Curucane, Carruacane) - San Rafael mission, Bolivia (unattested)
- Tapii - Santiago de Chiquitos mission, Bolivia (possibly Zamucoan)

Chiquitano speakers also lived in many of the missions. All of the peoples listed above switched to Chiquitano by the 19th century.

(See Jesuit Missions of Chiquitos for locations.)

Mason (1950) says the first four are "separate and very different", but Loukotka (1968) notes that nothing is known of Curave or Curucane (or of Tapii), that only 14 words of Curumina and 19 of Covare have been preserved.

== Grammar ==
The suffix -ra is found in body part names. Similarly, the suffix -ka is found on words for round fruits.
