= Bororo (disambiguation) =

Bororo may refer to:

- Bororo (Amerindian people), an indigenous people of Brazil and Bolivia
- Bororo language, a language of Brazil and Bolivia
  - Bororoan languages, a Macro-Ge language family
- Bororo Fulbe, an indigenous people of West Africa
- Bororo, or Carlos Maturana (born 1953), Chilean painter
- Bororo, or small red brocket, a deer species
