= Piso Firme =

- Town
- Location within Bolivia
- Coordinates: 13°37′S 61°44′W
- Country: Bolivia
- Department: Santa Cruz Department
- Province: José Miguel de Velasco Province
- Municipality: San Ignacio de Velasco Municipality
- Time zone: UTC-4 (BOT)

Piso Firme is a town in the Santa Cruz Department of Bolivia.

== Climate ==
Climate data for Piso Firme, elevation 260 m (850 ft), (1991–2011)
Month	Jan	Feb	Mar	Apr	May	Jun	Jul	Aug	Sep	Oct	Nov	Dec	Year
Mean daily maximum °C (°F)	31.7 (89.1)	31.6 (88.9)	32.4 (90.3)	32.4 (90.3)	31.4 (88.5)	31.4 (88.5)	31.7 (89.1)	33.1 (91.6)	33.6 (92.5)	33.6 (92.5)	32.9 (91.2)	32.0 (89.6)	32.3 (90.2)
Daily mean °C (°F)	27.1 (80.8)	26.9 (80.4)	27.4 (81.3)	26.9 (80.4)	25.2 (77.4)	24.3 (75.7)	24.5 (76.1)	25.5 (77.9)	26.6 (79.9)	27.5 (81.5)	27.2 (81.0)	27.1 (80.8)	26.4 (79.4)
Mean daily minimum °C (°F)	22.4 (72.3)	22.2 (72.0)	22.4 (72.3)	21.4 (70.5)	18.9 (66.0)	17.2 (63.0)	17.3 (63.1)	17.9 (64.2)	19.6 (67.3)	21.3 (70.3)	21.5 (70.7)	22.1 (71.8)	20.4 (68.6)
Average precipitation mm (inches)	407.8 (16.06)	346.5 (13.64)	239.5 (9.43)	145.8 (5.74)	55.8 (2.20)	15.8 (0.62)	20.2 (0.80)	26.4 (1.04)	61.3 (2.41)	135.9 (5.35)	239.2 (9.42)	312.2 (12.29)	2,006.4 (79)
Average precipitation days	19.8	18.3	17.0	9.2	5.4	2.0	1.6	1.7	4.7	9.0	14.4	17.8	120.9
Source: Servicio Nacional de Meteorología e Hidrología de Bolivia
