= Chaplín Lake =

Lake in Santa Cruz Department, Bolivia

Laguna Chaplín
- Location within Bolivia Location within Brazil Location within South America
- Interactive map of Laguna Chaplín
- Location: San Ignacio de Velasco Municipality, José Miguel de Velasco Province, Santa Cruz Department
- Coordinates: 14°28′22″S 61°3′38″W
- Basin countries: Bolivia
- Surface area: 13 km^{2} (5.0 sq mi)
- Surface elevation: 190 m (620 ft)

Laguna Chaplín is a lake in the San Ignacio de Velasco Municipality, José Miguel de Velasco Province, Santa Cruz Department, Bolivia. At an elevation of 190 m, its surface area is 13 km^{2}.
