= Umutina =

Indigenous Brazilian Ethnic Group

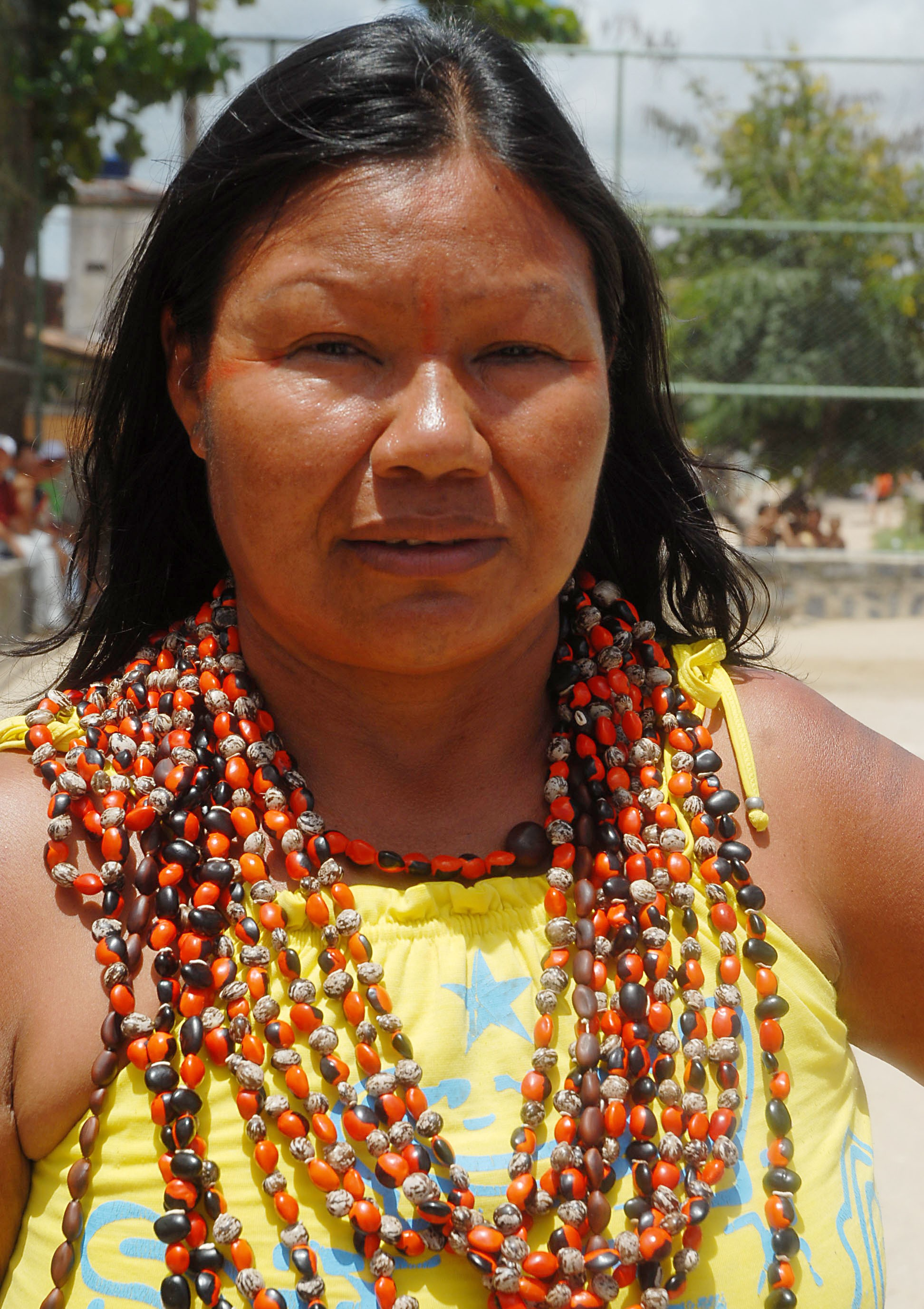
- Umutina cacique Creusa Soipa

Total population
- 124

Regions with significant populations
- Brazil

Languages
- Bororo, Portuguese, formerly Umotina

The Umutina are an Indigenous people from the Mato Grosso region of eastern Brazil. They are a member of the Bororo language group.
