= Bororo of Cabaçal =

Extinct language of Brazil

- Western Bororo, Aravirá
- Native to: Brazil
- Region: Mato Grosso
- Ethnicity: Bororo
- Era: attested 1840s
- Language family: Macro-Jê ?: Bororoan; Bororo of Cabaçal

Language codes
- ISO 639-3: None (mis)
- Glottolog: None boro1282 Bororo

Bororo of Cabaçal (Portuguese: Bororo do Cabaçal, Aravirá, Western Bororo) is an extinct Bororoan language that was spoken around the Cabaçal River in Mato Grosso, Brazil. It has been documented in word lists collected by Johann Natterer in 1825 and by Francis de Castelnau in the 1840s. Bororo of Cabaçal was recently identified by Camargo (2014) as a separate language distinct from Bororo proper. Loukotka incorrectly lists Aravirá as unattested, when in reality it is known from the two wordlists above.

== Vocabulary ==
Vocabulary as collected by Castelnau:

Bororo vocabulary
English	Bororo
God	Itopa, Toua
Devil	Jagoreka
Man	Cratomé
Woman	Cugna
Son	Iro
Daughter	Ito
Head	Ita-wara
Hair	Itai
Forehead	Temoquai
Eye	Itai
