= Astrothelium pallidoflavum =

Scientific classification
- Kingdom: Fungi
- Division: Ascomycota
- Class: Dothideomycetes
- Order: Trypetheliales
- Family: Trypetheliaceae
- Genus: Astrothelium
- Species: A. pallidoflavum

Binomial name
- Astrothelium pallidoflavum Flakus & Aptroot (2016)

Species of lichen

Astrothelium pallidoflavum is a species of corticolous (bark-dwelling) lichen in the family Trypetheliaceae. Found in Bolivia, it was formally described as a new species in 2016 by lichenologists Adam Flakus and André Aptroot. The type specimen was collected from Noel Kempff Mercado National Park (José Miguel de Velasco Province, Santa Cruz Department) at an altitude of 220 m (720 ft); there, in a Beni savanna with trees, the lichen was found growing on bark. It is only known to occur at the type locality. The species epithet refers to the characteristic pale yellow colour of the pseudostromata. Astrothelium pallidoflavum is similar to A. cinnamomeum, but has larger ascospores (27–30 by 10–12 μm) than that species.
