= Bororo =

Boe
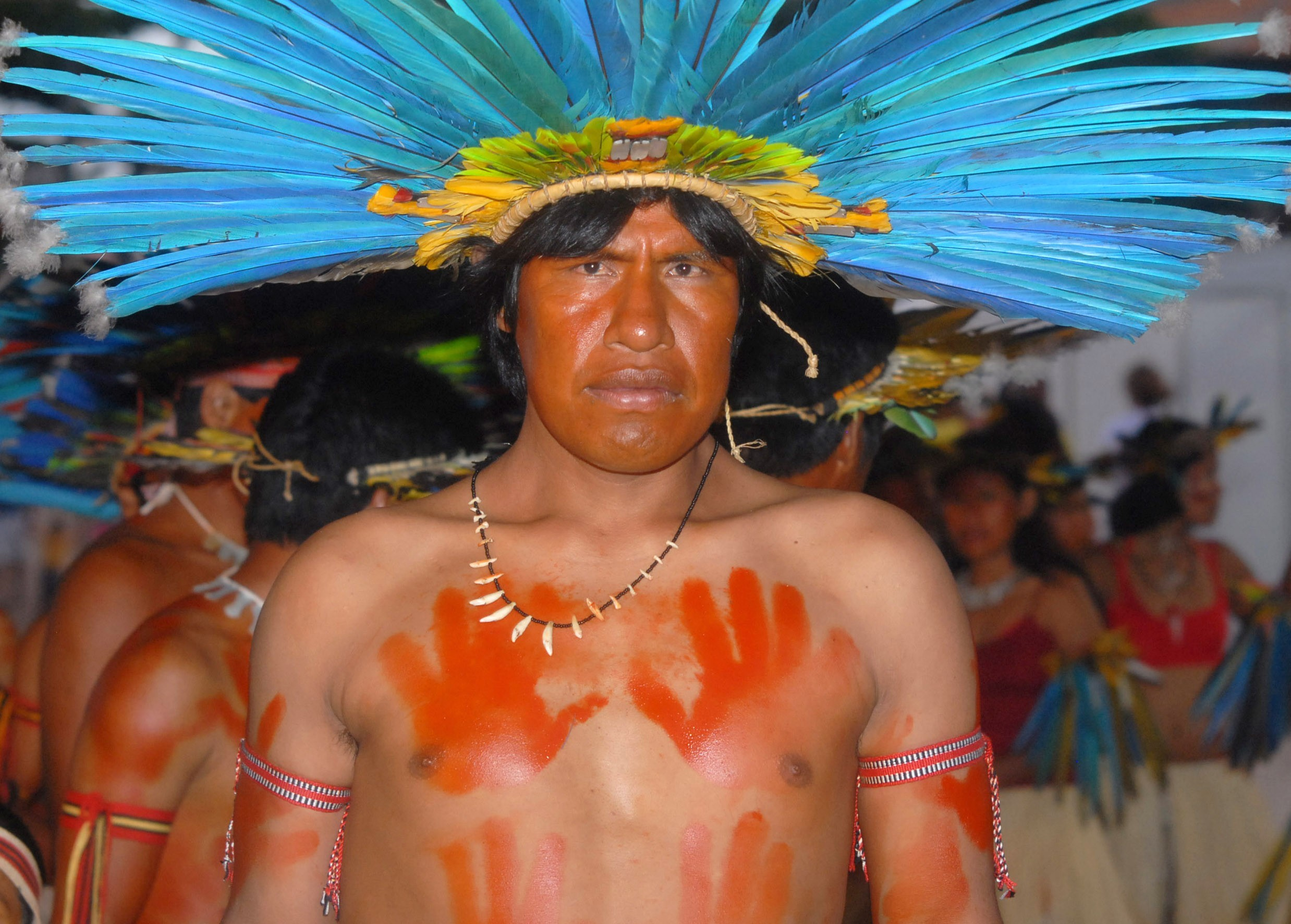
- Bororo-Boe man from Mato Grosso at Brazil's Indigenous Games, 2007

Total population
- 1,817 (2014)

Regions with significant populations
- Brazil (Mato Grosso)

Languages
- Borôro, Portuguese

Religion
- Animism

The Bororo, self-denominated as Boe, are Indigenous people of Brazil, living in the state of Mato Grosso. They also extended into Bolivia and the Brazilian state of Goiás. The Western Bororo live around the Jauru and Cabaçal rivers. The Eastern Bororo (Orarimogodoge) live in the region of the São Lourenço, Garças, and Vermelho Rivers. The Bororo live in eight villages. The Bororo (or even Coroados, Orarimogodo) are an ethnic group in Brazil that has an estimated population of just under two thousand. They speak the Borôro language (code ISO 639 : BOR) and are mainly of animistic belief. They live in eight villages in the central areas of Mato Grosso. A famous exponent of this group is Cândido Rondon, a Brazilian army official and founder of Fundação Nacional do Índio (or FUNAI). Bororo's culture was closely studied by French anthropologist Claude Lévi-Strauss during his expedition to Amazonia and Mato Grosso (1935–1936), described in his famous book Tristes Tropiques (1955).

== Names ==
The Bororo, whose name means "village court" in their language, are also known as the Araés, Araripoconé, Boe, Coroados, Coxiponé, Cuiabá, and Porrudos people.

== History ==
The first contact with the European colonizers took place in the seventeenth century with the arrival of the Jesuit missionaries. In the past, most Bororo groups were continually at war with other Bororo groups, as well as with other tribes and non-indigenous Brazilians, and their war parties undertook long-distance raids. Bororo villages formed long-term alliances for war. In the 18th century, mining sites for the extraction of gold began in Mato Grosso. Due to the pressure of the garimpeiros, the gold seekers, Bororo divided into two groups, those of the East (Coroados) and those of the West (Campanhas), which once separated never returned to be united.

The Bororo of the West disappeared in the second half of the 20th century in Bolivia. The Eastern Bororo, however, remained isolated from the world until the middle of the nineteenth century when a road was built connecting the Mato Grosso region to São Paulo and Minas Gerais. This road passed through the São Lourenço valley, where Bororo lived. This was the reason why the most violent conflict was triggered in the history of the conquest of Mato Grosso. After fifty years of war, Bororo surrendered to the state and after that apparent truce came the diamond seekers who also exploited and severely damaged the territory. After these conflicts, the Bororo people saw some peace with the mission of pacifying the Salesian missionaries. Their "Christianization" was, in any case, another event that contributed to almost completely extinguishing their linguistic and cultural heritage. Obviously today the situation of Bororo seems less critical than in the past.

== Culture ==
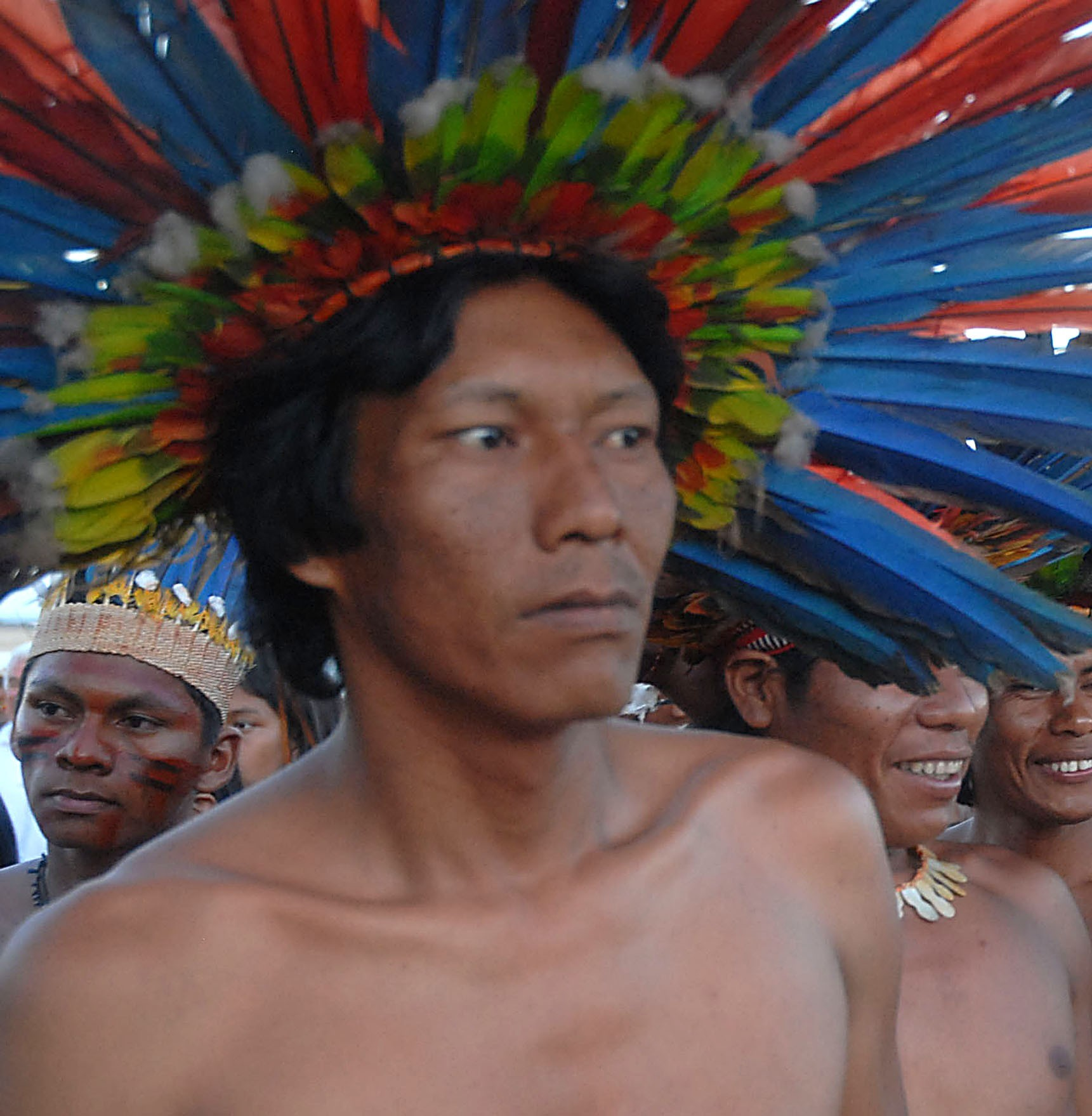
Bororo-Boe man from Mato Grosso at Brazil's Indigenous Games, 2007

While searching for missing explorer Percy Fawcett in 1930, a wayward party including Aloha Wanderwell filmed the daily activities of the Bororo. A 32-minute silent film from the trip survives as part of the Smithsonian Institution's Human Studies Film Archives and documents a ceremonial dance, a first contact scenario with Boboré villagers, and Bororo men experiencing sympathetic labor pains. Anthropologist Claude Lévi-Strauss lived for some time among the Bororo during his first stay in Brazil (1935–1939). Their mythology features extensively in his book The Raw and the Cooked.

Marshal Cândido Rondon (1865–1956), who was to become the first director of Brazil's Indians Protection Bureau (SPI/FUNAI) and creator of the Xingu National Park, was the son of a Bororo woman. His first major success after joining the Army was the installation of a telegraph line to Mato Grosso. He not only was able to pacify the Bororo, who had blocked previous attempts to set up that line, but even recruited their help to complete it.

The Bororo associate body odor with a person's life force, and breath odor with the person's soul.

=== Language ===
The Bororo people speak Bororo Proper, which belongs to the Bororo language family in the Macro-Ge language family. Literacy rates are under 30%. The language is written in the Latin script.

The Bororo people call their original language Boe Wadáru. The majority of the population today speaks Portuguese and the Bororo language.

This language is spoken by about a thousand individuals who constitute a small ethnic group of the Amazon named Bororo people; Its diffusion area is mainly found in the Brazilian region of Mato Grosso. In 1976, there was recorded a very low native number (four people) in the Bolivian district of Santa Cruz, in the province of Angel Sandoval, near the border with Brazil. However, today it is supposed that the Bororo language is extinct in Bolivia since it is thought to have been incorporated by other predominant linguistic realities. Today the Bororo language is spoken in Brazil in the state of Mato Grosso, mainly in the villages of Meruri, Sangradouro and Perigera. Even in Brazil, this language risked being extinct forever. Towards the end of the 1960s the use of the Bororo language was forbidden in the towns of Merai and Sangradouro where the Salesian mission was operating, but with the passing of time it was restored, and the bilingual education was put into practice. All this led to a moderate revitalization of the language, but since then it is still spoken by just 1024 individuals, making it a so-called "extinct language" or threatened.

=== Social structure ===
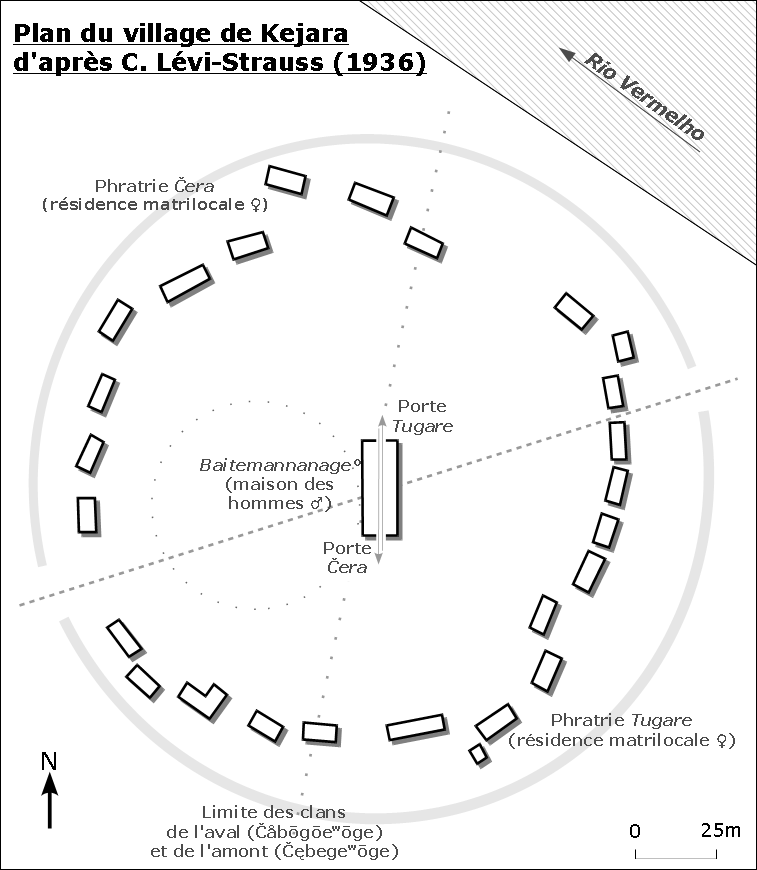
Description of the village given by Claude Lévi-Strauss

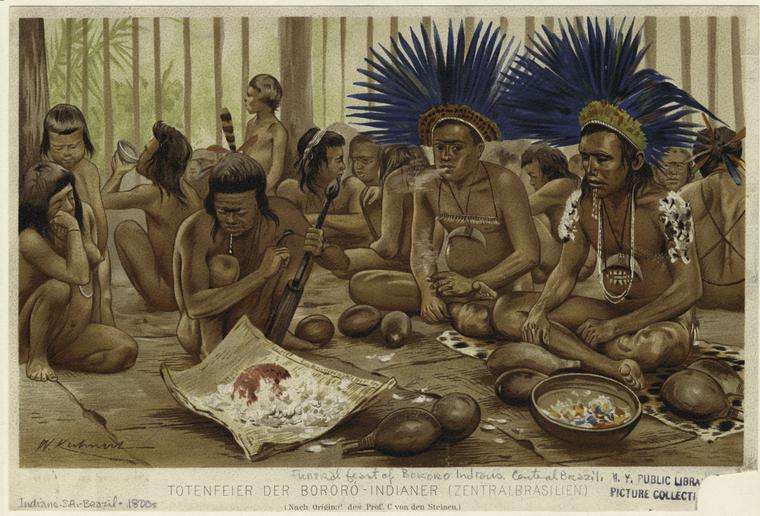
Funeral banquet of Bororo Indians in engraving by Friedrich Wilhelm Kuhnert (1865–1926)

The Bororo are a small people in the Amazon rainforest living in the southwest of the Brazilian region of Mato Grosso. The literal translation of the word "boror" is "village courtyard". It's no coincidence that Bororo's homes are traditionally arranged in a circle that will be a kind of spatiotis or patio for them, which will act as the main space of Bororo's life. This square, if so called, is so important that it has given the same name to this group of people as it is within that typical courtyard that the Bororo people concentrate most of the social phenomena and spirit-Religious. In the complex social organization of Bororo, the classification of individuals is governed by several number of factors including clan membership, blood descent, and group of residence (referring to where a family lives in the village). This last detail is important because in the spatial distribution of homes each clan occupies a precise role. The aldeia (village) is divided into two exogamic half-Exerae and Tugarége-each divided into four clans, consisting of several families. A curious aspect for a people that may sometimes seem primitive is that woman has a very particular role in the concept of Bororo society, and indeed the rule of the offspring predicts that this is matriarchal, and that the infant then receives a name that Join the mother clan. The importance of these rules is also noted in marriage. After a Bororo wedding, the man will have to live in the house of his bride and will also have obligations to his family, such as fishing, hunting, working and, if necessary, making ornamental items for his bride's brother. Although it seems that man is totally devoted and devoted entirely to his wife after marriage, it is this complexity of conjugal relationships that is the cause of frequent separations, making it possible for a man to live in multiple homes throughout his life. Despite everything that has so far been explained, it may lead to thinking that the husband's obligations to his wife are at the top of the pyramid because of their importance, another truth of the Bororo culture is that a man always maintains a bond with his much more important family Of what binds her to her bride. It is true that an adult male, although married, maintains a number of obligations to the women of his family, namely his sisters. For example, it is their custom that a man is more concerned with his grandchildren, "iwagedu" in Bororo, than his own children; The only obligation of a father to his children is to banish them, a physical and non-cultural obligation. The complex organization of their lives also reflects on how one lives in the home. In fact, although two families of different nuclei (having blood ties even outside that exact space) live under the same roof, they can divide the interior spaces of the house; It is not by chance that the ends of the house are more private areas where you can put this division into practice, and the center of the house is a shared space devoted to visits, small daily rituals, and eating meals. The Bororo home is usually left with doors and windows open to allow it to be able to control what is inside (in the center), except when rituals are held inside which women cannot attend or during mourning. One last interesting thing to consider is that, in mourning, the house becomes a space between the domestic domain and the public-legal domain (as Sylvia Caiuby Novaes observes) since the end of funerals must be destroyed after it has been completely empty throughout the mourning period.

=== Lifestyle ===
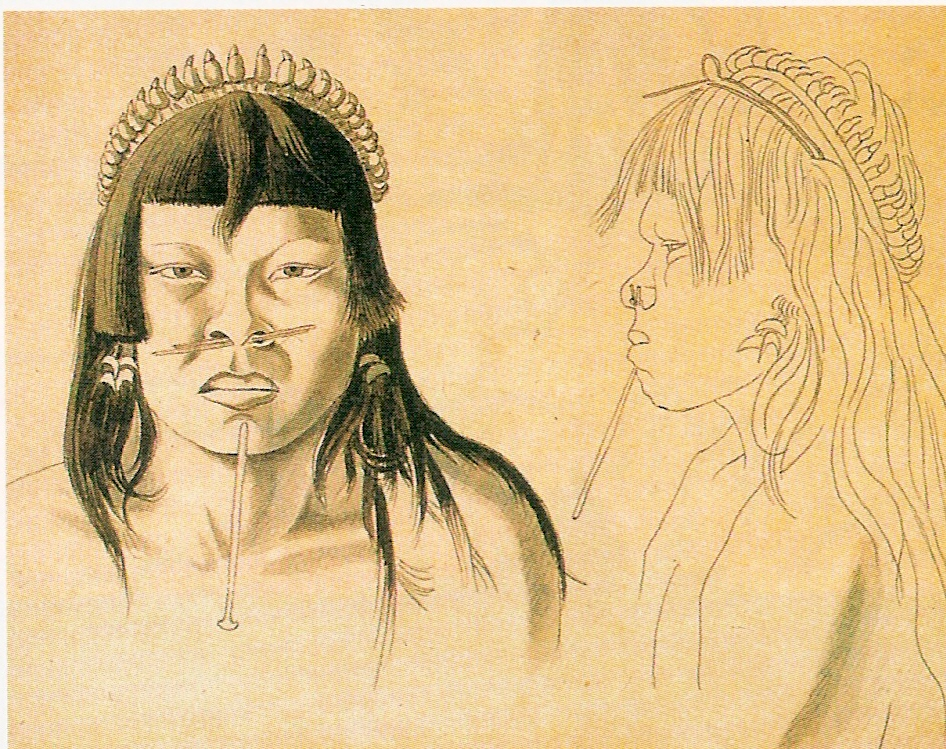
Portrait of an Amerindian Bororo, by Hercules Florence, during the expedition conducted in the Brazilian Amazon by Grigory Langsdorff from 1825 to 1829.

Traditionally hunters and gatherers, under the influence of the missionaries and then of the Brazilian authorities more recently, were put into agriculture, which now ensures their subsistence. Men hunt and women, especially in the Rio Vermelho region, plant and harvest recently introduced cassava, maize and rice. Since agriculture is practiced only by women, they are becoming increasingly important, particularly as a result of the scarcity of game. The Bororos practice many rituals including:

- Corn Festival, a celebration of cereal gathering, important food in Indian food;
- The piercing of the ears and the lips;
- The funeral ritual is a sacred celebration for all those who consider themselves Indians.

The rites of passage (in which individuals pass from one social category to another) the most important are:

- The naming ceremony;
- The initiation;
- The funerary rites, which can last up to 2 months and which have attracted the attention of ethnologists by their complexity.

== Biology ==
The Bororo all share the same blood type: Type O blood, like most Native Americans.

== See also ==
- Adugo, a two-player abstract strategy game invented by the Bororo
