= Umotína language =

Recently extinct language of Brazil

Umotína
- Umutína
- Native to: Brazil
- Region: Mato Grosso
- Ethnicity: 515 Umutina (2014)
- Extinct: 2004, with the death of Julá Paré
- Language family: Macro-Jê ?: Bororoan; Umotína

Language codes
- ISO 639-3: umo
- Glottolog: umot1240
- ELP: Umutina
- Umutina is classified as Extinct by the UNESCO Atlas of the World's Languages in Danger.

Umotína or Umutína is a recently extinct Bororoan language of Brazil. As of 2015, only two elders remembered the language. The language was decimated by various epidemics among the Umutina.

== Phonology ==
=== Consonants ===
It is one of the few languages in the world reported to have a linguolabial consonant: In unpublished data, Floyd Lounsbury recorded a voiceless linguolabial plosive [t̼].

==== Tan Huare (2015) ====
Tan Huare (2015) identifies the following consonant phones:

		Bilabial		Alveolar	Palatal (-alveolar)	Velar		Glottal
		plain	labial	Alveolar	Palatal (-alveolar)	plain	labial	Glottal
Nasal		m		n				
Plosive	voiceless	p	pʷ	t		k	kʷ	
Plosive	voiced	b	bʷ					
Fricative	voiceless			s	ʃ			h
Fricative	voiced			z	ʒ			
Approximant				l	j		w	
Tap				ɾ				

And the following phonemes:

		Bilabial	Alveolar	Palatal	Velar	Glottal
Nasal		m	n			
Plosive	voiceless	p	t		k	
Plosive	voiced	b				
Fricative	voiceless		s	ʃ		h
Fricative	voiced		z	ʒ		
Approximant		w	l	j		
Tap			ɾ			

==== Lima (1995) ====
Lima (1995) identifies the following consonant phonemes:

		Bilabial	Alveolar	Palatal	Velar
Nasal		m	n		
Plosive		p	t		k
Fricative	voiceless			ʃ	
Fricative	voiced		z	ʒ	
Approximant		w	l	j	
Tap			ɾ		

- /ʃ/ may be realized as [s] before /i, e/, e.g. [waˈse ~ waˈʃe] 'white person'.

=== Vowels ===
Tan Huare (2015) and Lima (1995) agree on the vowel phonemes.

	Front	Central	Back
Close	i	ɨ	u
Close-mid	e		o
Open-mid	ɛ		ɔ
Open		a	

== Bibliography ==
- Camargos, Lidiane Szerwinsk (2013). Consolidando uma proposta de Família Linguística Boróro: contribuição aos estudos histórico-comparativos do Tronco Macro-Jê (Doctoral thesis) (in Portuguese). Universidade de Brasília.
- Cruz, Mônica Cidele (August 28, 2012). Povo Umutína: a busca da identidade linguística e cultural = Umutína people : the search of linguistic and cultural identity (Doutora em Linguística thesis) (in Portuguese). Campinas, SP: Universidade Estadual de Campinas. doi:10.47749/t/unicamp.2012.876888.
- Cruz, Mônica Cidele; Corozomae, Marcio Monzilar (July 12, 2015). "O ENSINO DE LÍNGUA MATERNA NA ESCOLA INDÍGENA JULÁ PARÉ". Revista ECOS (in Portuguese). 18 (1). ISSN 2316-3933.
- Lima, Stella Telles Pereira (1995). A Língua Umutína: "um sopro de vida" (PDF) (Master's thesis). Recife: Universidade Federal de Pernambuco.
- Martin, Samuel E. (1956). "Review of A Manual of Phonology". Language. 32 (4): 683. doi:10.2307/411090. JSTOR 411090.
- Olson, Kenneth S.; Reiman, D. William; Sabio, Fernando; da Silva, Filipe Alberto (2013). "The voiced linguolabial plosive in Kajoko". Journal of West African Languages. 42 (2): 63.
- Schultz, Harald (1952). "Vocabulario dos Indios Umutina". Journal de la société des américanistes. 41 (1): 81–137. doi:10.3406/jsa.1952.2400.
- Tan Huare, Ducinéia (2015). Léxico remanescente Umutina: repertório linguístico de seus lembrantes (PDF) (masters thesis). Caceres: Universidade do Estado de Mato Grosso.
- "Umutina - Indigenous Peoples in Brazil". pib.socioambiental.org.
