= Aloha Wanderwell =

Canadian adventurer (1906–1996)

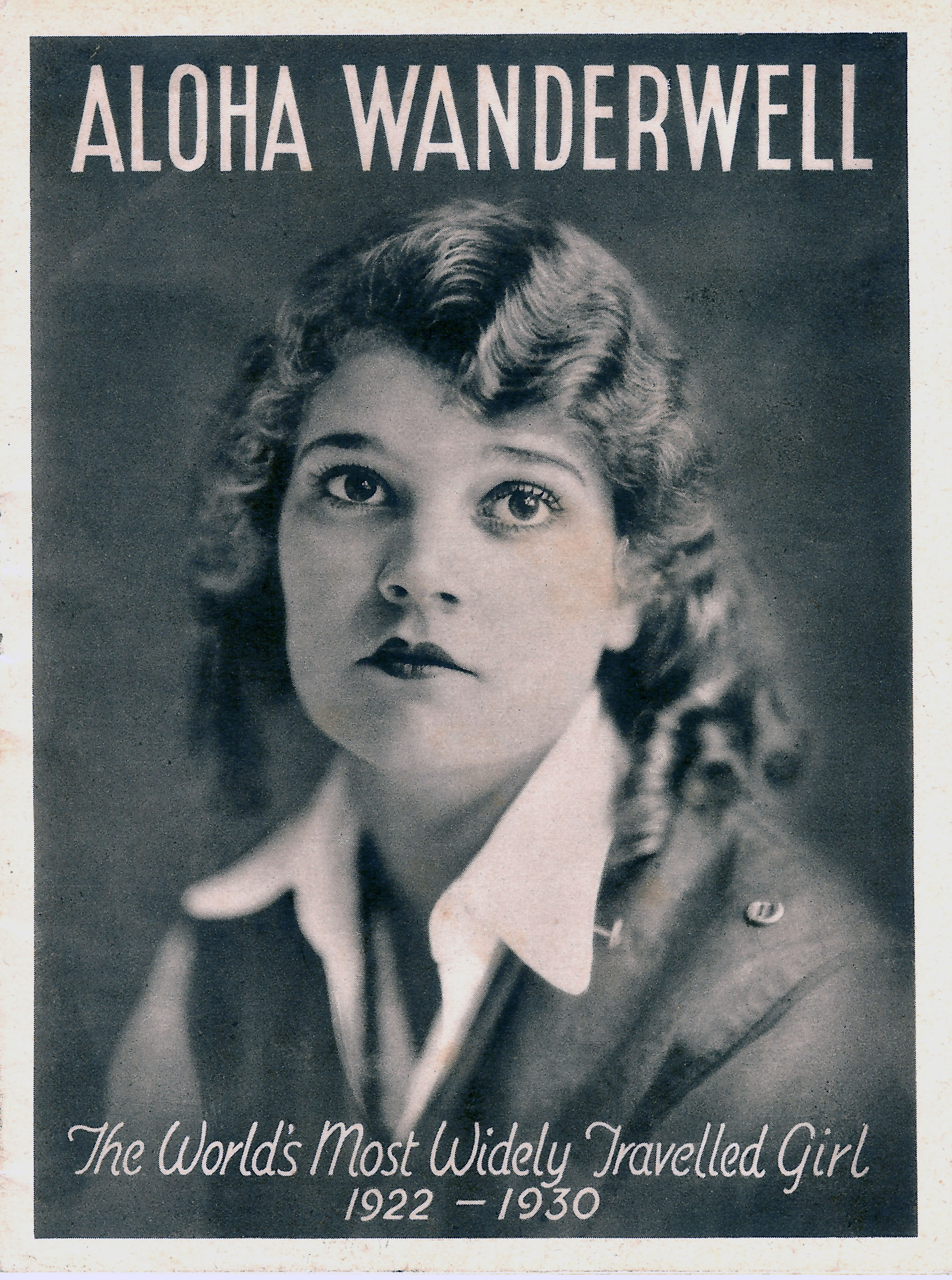
- Wanderwell in c. 1930
- Born: Idris Galcia Welsh; October 13, 1906; Winnipeg, Manitoba, Canada
- Died: June 4, 1996 (aged 89); Newport Beach, California, United States
- Other names: Idris Welsh, Idris Galcia Hall, Gilvis Wanderwell, Aloha W Baker
- Occupations: World automobile traveler, filmmaker, aviator, author, explorer, travel lecturer, editor, screenwriter, radio performer, spoke 11 languages
- Known for: First Woman to Drive Around the World in an automobile, starting at 16, certified by Guinness World Records
- Spouses: Walter Wanderwell (m. 1925; died 1932); Walter Baker (m. 1933)
- Children: Valri (b. 1925); Nile (b. 1927)

Aloha Wanderwell (Idris Galcia Hall née Welsh, October 13, 1906 – June 4, 1996) was a Canadian explorer, author, filmmaker, and aviator. Beginning when she was 16 years old, she became the first woman to drive around the globe, driving a Ford 1918 Model T over a five year period (1922–1927). Ultimately she traveled 500,000 miles across 80 countries.

== Early life ==
Idris Galcia Welsh was born on October 13, 1906, in Winnipeg, Manitoba, to Margaret Jane Hedley and Robert Welsh. When her mother married Herbert Hall in 1909, her name was changed to Idris Hall. Her step-father was a developer and rancher on Vancouver Island and the family lived in Parksville and Duncan. In 1914, at the start of the First World War, her step-father joined the Canadian Expeditionary Force and after arriving in England was transferred to the British Army and made a lieutenant in the Durham Light Infantry. The family (Idris, her sister Margaret Verner "Miki" Hall, and their mother) followed him to Europe, where they traveled around England, Belgium, and France. In June 1917, Herbert Hall was killed in combat in Ypres, Belgium.

During this time, Idris attended boarding schools in Europe: Benedictine Soeurs du Saint-Sacrement in Courtrai, Belgium; and Chateau Neuf in Nice, France.

== Career ==
Idris began her adventuring career when she met her traveling companion, Walter "Cap" Wanderwell, in 1922. They married in 1925 and had two children. As they continued to travel the world, Aloha Wanderwell performed on stage, giving travel lectures against the backdrop of a silent movie, Car and Camera Around the World. The Wanderwells made films of their travels on 35mm nitrate and 16mm film which are now held in the archives of the Library of Congress and the Academy of Motion Picture Arts and Sciences.

Wanderwell was stranded in Brazil for six weeks and during this time she lived among the Bororo people and made the earliest film documentation of them. In 1932, her husband was shot and killed on their yacht Carma in Long Beach, California. One year later, Wanderwell married Walter Baker and continued her travels, ultimately visiting over 80 countries and six continents, and driving over 500,000 miles in Ford vehicles.

=== The Wanderwell Expedition ===
In 1921, Walter Wanderwell (born Valerian Johannes Pieczynski in Poland) was capturing headlines with the Million Dollar Wager, a round-the-world endurance race between two teams racing Ford Model Ts to see which team could visit the most countries. A controversial figure, Wanderwell had been jailed in the United States during World War I on suspicion of being a German spy, but was released in 1918. Wanderwell was inspired by his meeting with the League of Nations and around 1930 he formed his own organization Work Around the World Educational Club or (WAWEC).

In 1922, when she was 16, Idris applied for a job of mechanic and filmmaker as the team motored around in 1917 Model Ts. After responding to an advertisement reading, "Brains, Beauty & Breeches – World Tour Offer For Lucky Young Woman…. Wanted to join an expedition… Asia, Africa…", she met with "Captain" Wanderwell in Paris and secured a seat on the expedition. She served as the expedition's translator, driver and film maker, and took on the name "Aloha Wanderwell," even though Walter was still married at the time. Idris quickly became the face of the expedition, which captured her adventures in a series of movie travelogues.

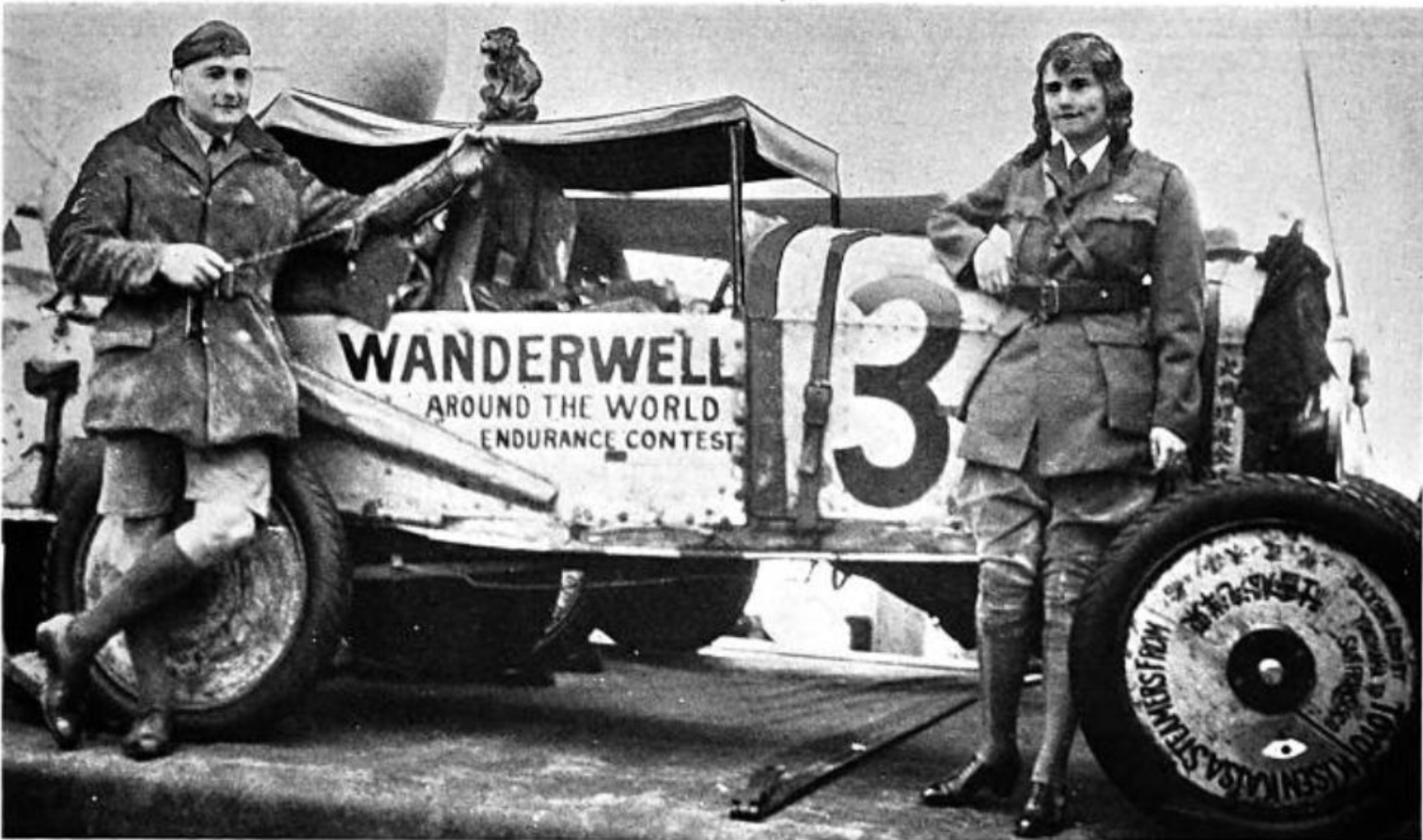
Walter and Aloha Wanderwell with their Ford automobile, from a 1925 publication

=== "First Woman to Drive Around the World", 1922–1927 ===
Wanderwell became the first woman to drive around the world, beginning and ending her journey in Nice, France, between December 29, 1922, and January 1927. In a Model T Ford, Wanderwell made the journey as driver, translator and filmmaker for Wanderwell Expeditions, a round-the-world motoring tour led by Walter "Cap" Wanderwell (Poland). The first woman to circumnavigate the world in an automobile was Harriet White Fisher in 1909–1910, but she used a chauffeur and did not drive herself.

Partially sponsored by the Ford Motor Company, the round-the-world tour also sustained itself through filming and travel lectures, from Africa through the Middle East and on to Asia. In Calcutta in 1924, their tour crossed paths with planes from the first aerial circumnavigation, and Idris filmed their meeting.

=== Encounter with Bororo people, Brazil ===
In 1930 and 1931, Aloha Wanderwell learned to fly a German seaplane, "Junker", that she would later land on an uncharted part of the Amazon River when the Wanderwells traveled to the state of Mato Grosso in Brazil. They set up camp at the Descalvados Ranch in Cuiabá and were ostensibly searching for the lost explorer Colonel Percival Harrison Fawcett, who was looking for the legendary Lost City of Z. They made several flights with a seaplane, once running out of fuel on the Paraguay River and receiving help from the Bororo people. The crew's cameraman filmed a ceremonial dance, a first contact scenario with Boboré villagers, and Bororo men experiencing sympathetic labor pains. The 32-minute silent film called Last of the Bororos is preserved in the Smithsonian Institution's Human Studies Film Archives and includes Aloha Wanderwell's meeting with Brazilian explorer Cândido Rondon.

== Marriage to Walter Wanderwell ==
Arriving in the United States in 1925, Aloha married Walter Wanderwell on April 7 in Riverside, California. Their marriage prevented the FBI from arresting Wanderwell under the Mann Act, a law that prohibits transporting women across state lines for "immoral purposes."

Aloha gave birth to a daughter, Valri, in December 1925 and a son, Nile, in April 1927. The Wanderwells continued their travels, sailing to Cuba and South Africa. Aside from dealing with poor roads, the Wanderwells also had difficulty finding gasoline for their vehicles. During their travels through Africa from 1926 to 1928, they used crushed bananas for grease and elephant fat for engine oil. The global tour included 43 countries. Author Stookie Allen contends that during this time, Aloha cut her hair and fought as a member of the French Foreign Legion.

The Wanderwells returned to the United States where they made a home in Miami in 1929 and donated one of their Model Ts, known as Little Lizzie, to Henry Ford before the screening of the film, Car and Camera Around the World. In 1942, Henry Ford decided that Little Lizzie and 50 other autos would be scrapped for the war effort.

=== Murder of Walter Wanderwell ===
In late 1932, the couple purchased a yacht, the 110-foot Carma, intending to document their voyage to the South Seas on film. On December 5, 1932, the day before they were to embark, Walter Wanderwell was murdered on the yacht in the harbor near Long Beach, California. William James Guy, a member of their 1931 expedition to South America who had attempted to mutiny on a previous voyage, was tried for the crime. Guy had an alibi and was acquitted by the jury and Judge Kenny. Another man, Edward Eugene Fernando Montague, was briefly considered a suspect, but was never charged.

== Later life ==
Wanderwell married Walter Baker in 1933 in Louisiana. The couple traveled to New Zealand, Australia, Hawaii, India, Cambodia, Wyoming (USA) and Indochina, with Aloha later recounting being surrounded by five herds of elephants and having to shoot their way out. Her final films include To See the World by Car (1935–37), India Now, and Explorers of the Purple Sage, in Technicolor, which contains the only known footage of Desert Dust, the famous palomino wild horse.

Aloha continued to give lectures, and during this period, she wrote an autobiographical account of her travels, Call to Adventure!, which was published in 1939, and republished in 2012. The couple settled in Cincinnati, Ohio, where Aloha worked in radio broadcasting (WLW Radio) and print journalism. In 1947, she and Baker moved to Lido Isle community in Newport Beach, California. Aloha gave her final performance for 150 family members and guests, with Dr. Pete Lee, curator at the Natural History Museum in Los Angeles in 1982. She died on June 4, 1996.

== Archives ==
Footage by Aloha Wanderwell is held at the Academy Film Archive in the Aloha Wanderwell Baker Film Collection. The Academy Film Archive has preserved many of these films, from both 35mm nitrate and 16mm sources, including rare 1920s and 1930s footage.

In 2020, With Car and Camera Around the World was selected for preservation in the United States National Film Registry by the Library of Congress as being "culturally, historically, or aesthetically significant".

== Works ==
=== Filmography ===
- Australia Now
- Cape to Cairo
- Car and Camera Around the World
- Explorers of the Purple Sage
- Flight to the Stone Age
- India Now
- Last of the Bororos
- Magic of Mexico
- My Hawaii
- River of Death
- To See the World by Car
- Victory in the Pacific

=== Books ===
- Call to Adventure!
