= Bororoan languages =

Language family indigenous to Brazil

Borôroan
- Borotuke
- Geographic distribution: Brazil, formerly Bolivia
- Linguistic classification: Macro-Jê?: Borôroan
- Subdivisions: Umotína †; Otuke–Bororo

Language codes
- Glottolog: boro1281
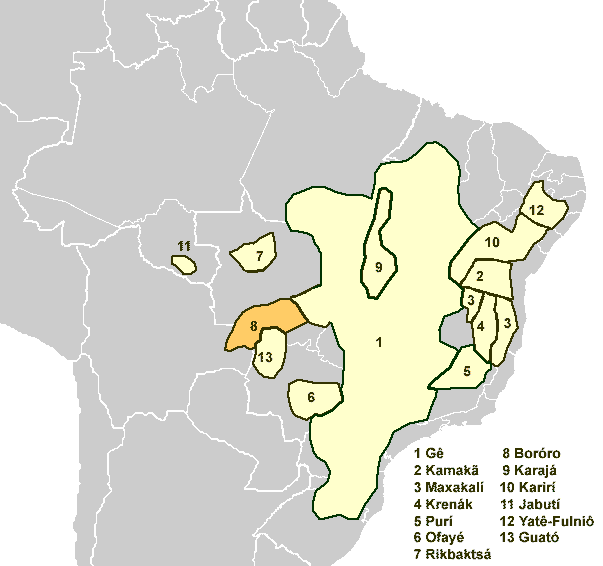
- Geographical distribution of the Borôroan languages

The Borôroan languages of Brazil and Bolivia are Borôro and the extinct Umotína, Kovareka, Kuruminaka and Otuke. They are sometimes considered to form part of the proposed Macro-Jê language family, though this has been disputed.

They are called the Borotuke languages by Mason (1950), a portmanteau of Bororo and Otuke.

== Languages ==
The relationship between the languages is,

- Umotina (†)
- Otuke–Bororo
  - Borôro
  - ? Bororo of Cabaçal (Aravirá) (†)
  - Otuke (†)
  - Kovareka–Kuruminaka (†)

Gorgotoqui may have also been a Bororoan language.

Bororo of Cabaçal, which has been documented by Johann Natterer and Francis de Castelnau, has been identified by Camargo (2014) as a separate language distinct from Bororo proper.

=== Loukotka (1968) ===
Loukotka (1968) lists the following languages of the Boróro stock:

- Boróro / Coroados / Biribocone - extinct language once spoken on the Cabaçal and Jauru Rivers, state of Mato Grosso.
- Aravirá – extinct language once spoken on the Cabaçal River and Sepotuba River in Mato Grosso. [Is a synonym of Bororo of Cabaçal.]
- Orari / Eastern Boróro / Orarimugodoge - language spoken by an ancient warlike tribe on the Valhas River, Garças River, and Madeira River, Mato Grosso. [Is a dialect of Bororo proper.]
- Umutina / Barbudo - spoken by a few families between the Paraguai and Bugres Rivers, Mato Grosso.
- Otuque / Loushiru - spoken at the ancient mission of Santo Corazon in the Bolivian Chaco, now by a few individuals.
- Covare - extinct language once spoken at the ancient mission of Santa Ana de Chiquitos, Bolivia.
- Curumina - extinct language from the ancient mission of Casalvasco.
- Curucane / Carruacane - extinct language once spoken at the ancient mission of San Rafael, Bolivia. (Unattested.)
- Curave / Ecorabe - extinct language once spoken at the ancient mission of Santo Corazon, Bolivia. (Unattested.)
- Tapii - extinct language from the ancient mission of Santiago de Chiquitos, Bolivia. Possibly a Zamucoan language. (Unattested.)

=== Mason (1950) ===
The following are listed as Bororo varieties by Mason (1950):

Bororo

- Eastern: Orarimugudoge
- Western: Cabasal; Campanya
- Acioné
- Aravira
- Biriuné
- Coroa (?)
- Coxipo (?)

== Proto-language ==
For a list of Proto-Bororo reconstructions by Camargos (2013), see the corresponding Portuguese article.

== External relations ==
The Bororoan languages are commonly thought to be part of the Macro-Jê language family.

Ceria & Sandalo (1995) note parallels between Bororo and the Guaicuruan languages. Kaufman (1994) has suggested a relationship with the Chiquitano language, which Nikulin (2020) considers to be a sister of Macro-Jê. Furthermore, Nikulin (2019) has suggested that Bororoan has a relationship with the Cariban and Kariri languages:

gloss	Proto-Bororo	Kariri	Proto-Cariban
tooth	*ɔ	dza	*(j)ə
ear	*bidʒa	beɲe	*pana
go	*tu		*tə
tree	*i	dzi	*jeje
tongue		nunu	*nuru
root		mu	*mi(t-)
hand		(a)mɨsã	*əmija
fat (n.)	*ka		*ka(t-)
seed	*a		*a
fish	*karo		*kana
name	*idʒe	dze	
heavy	*motɨtɨ	madi	

An automated computational analysis (ASJP 4) by Müller et al. (2013) also found lexical similarities between Bororoan and Cariban.

== Language contact ==
Jolkesky (2016) notes that there are lexical similarities with the Guato, Karib, Kayuvava, Nambikwara, and Tupi language families due to contact.

Cariban influence in Bororoan languages was due to the later southward expansion of Cariban speakers into Bororoan territory. Ceramic technology was also adopted from Cariban speakers. Similarly, Cariban borrowings are also present in the Karajá languages. Karajá speakers had also adopted ceramic technology from Cariban speakers.

Similarities with Cayuvava are due to the expansion of Bororoan speakers into the Chiquitania region.
