= Santa Ana de Velasco =

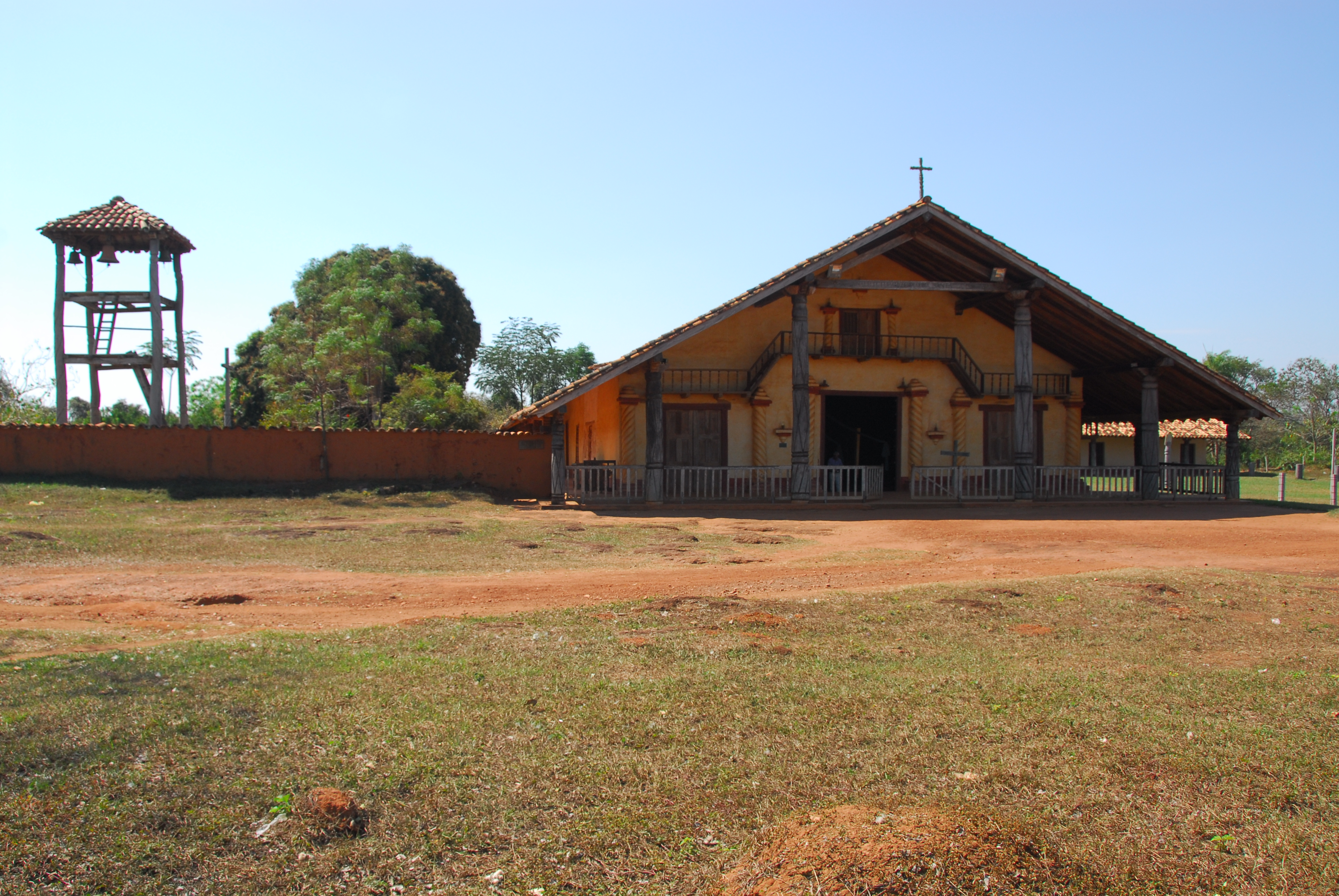
- Mission church of Santa Ana de Velasco

- Location in Bolivia
- Coordinates: 16°35′1″S 60°41′16″W
- Country: Bolivia
- Department: Santa Cruz Department
- Province: José Miguel de Velasco Province
- Municipality: San Ignacio de Velasco Municipality
- Elevation: 1,522 ft (464 m)

Population (2010)est.
  - Total: 684
- Time zone: UTC-4 (BOT)

Santa Ana de Velasco (or simply Santa Ana) is a small town in the Santa Cruz Department, Bolivia.

== History ==
The mission of Santa Ana was founded in 1755 by Julian Knogler.

== Location ==
Santa Ana is the central town of Cantón Santa Ana and is located in the San Ignacio de Velasco Municipality, José Miguel de Velasco Province. It is known as part of the Jesuit Missions of the Chiquitos, which is declared in 1990 a World Heritage Site, as a former Jesuit Reduction. The town is situated at an elevation of 464 m in the Chiqitanía region between Santa Cruz capital and the Brazilian border.

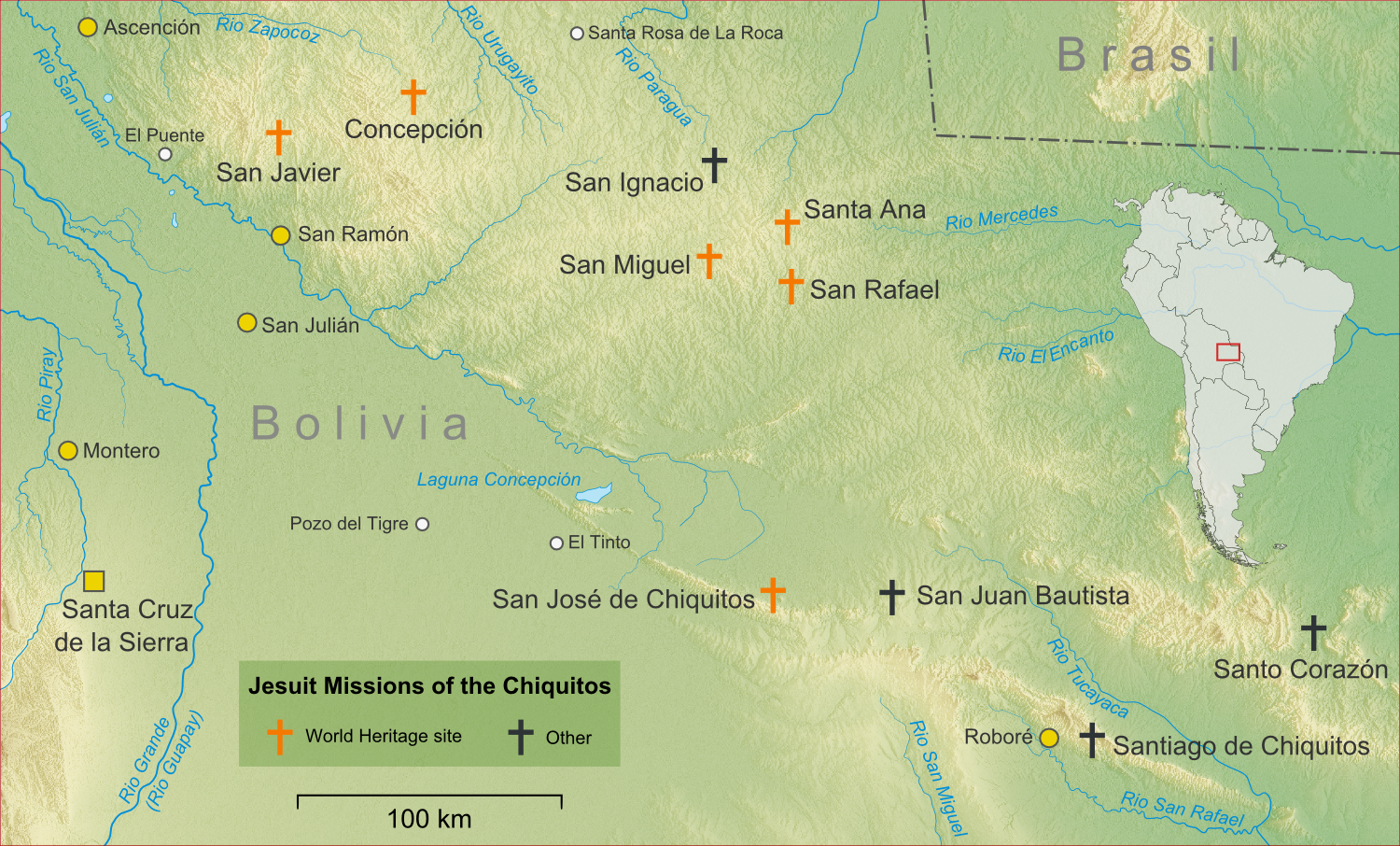
Map showing the present location of the Jesuit Missions of the Chiquitos in Bolivia

== Transportation ==
Santa Ana is located 441 km north-east of Santa Cruz, the department's capital.

From there, the national road Ruta 4 goes north to Montero, Santa Cruz where it meets Ruta 10. This road goes east for 339 km to San Ignacio de Velasco, on its way passing San Ramón, San Javier and Santa Rosa de la Roca.

From San Ignacio, a dirt road goes south to San Rafael de Velasco and passes Santa Ana after 45 km.

== Population ==
The population of the place has increased rapidly over the past two decades:

- 1992: 284 inhabitants (census)
- 2001: 483 inhabitants (census)
- 2010: 684 inhabitants (updating)

== Languages ==
Today, Camba Spanish is the most commonly used everyday language. In the past, various languages related to Otuke, such as Covareca and Curuminaca, were spoken at the mission of Santa Ana.

== See also ==
- List of Jesuit sites
- List of the Jesuit Missions of Chiquitos
