= Gorgotoqui language =

Undocumented extinct language in Bolivia

Gorgotoqui
- (unattested)
- Native to: eastern Bolivia
- Region: Chiquitania
- Extinct: 17th century
- Language family: unclassified; Bororoan ?

Language codes
- ISO 639-3: None (mis)
- Linguist List: 0is
- Glottolog: None

Gorgotoqui is an extinct and undocumented language of the Chiquitania region of the eastern Bolivian lowlands.

== Spellings ==
Alternate spellings include Borogotoqui, Brotoqui, Corocoqui, Corocotoqui, Corocotoquy, Corogotoqui, Corotoque, Gorgotaci, Gorgotoci, Gorgotoquci, Gorogotoqui, Guorcocoqui, Jorocotoqui, Korchkoki, Orotocoqui.

== History ==
During the period of the Jesuit missions to Chiquitos, Gorgotoqui was the most populous language in the area. It became a lingua franca and the sole language of the Jesuit missions (ICOMOS 1990:59). A Jesuit priest, Kaspar Rueß (Spanish: Gaspar Ruíz), (born 11 November 1585, Haunstadt, Bavaria; died 12 April 1624, Santa Cruz de la Sierra, Bolivia) wrote a grammar, but no one has been able to locate it "in recent years", and no other documentation has survived. Thus a language that was regionally important during the colonial era disappeared under pressure from another lingua franca; this appears to have occurred in under half a century.

== Classification ==
Čestmír Loukotka classified Gorgotoqui as a language isolate, but Terrence Kaufman left it unclassified because of a lack of data, and excluded the language from his assessment in 1994. Several languages of the missions "had nothing in common" according to Oliva & Pazos.

=== Bororoan affiliation ===
Combès (2010) suggests that Gorgotoqui may have been a Bororoan language. Nikulin (2019) suggests the etymology barogo- /barəkə-/ ‘animal’ + -doge /-toke/ ‘plural [+animate]’ for the ethnonym Gorgotoqui.

Combès (2012) also suggests that Penoquí was likely a name given to the Gorgotoqui during the 16th century, and that they were related to the Otuqui (Otuke); indeed, the Gorgotoqui may have been Otuqui who had undergone heavy Chiquitano cultural influence. The Penoqui and Otuqui both lived in the Jesuit Missions of Chiquitos together with the Chiquitano.
