= Bellavista Lake =

Lake in Bolivia

Laguna Bellavista
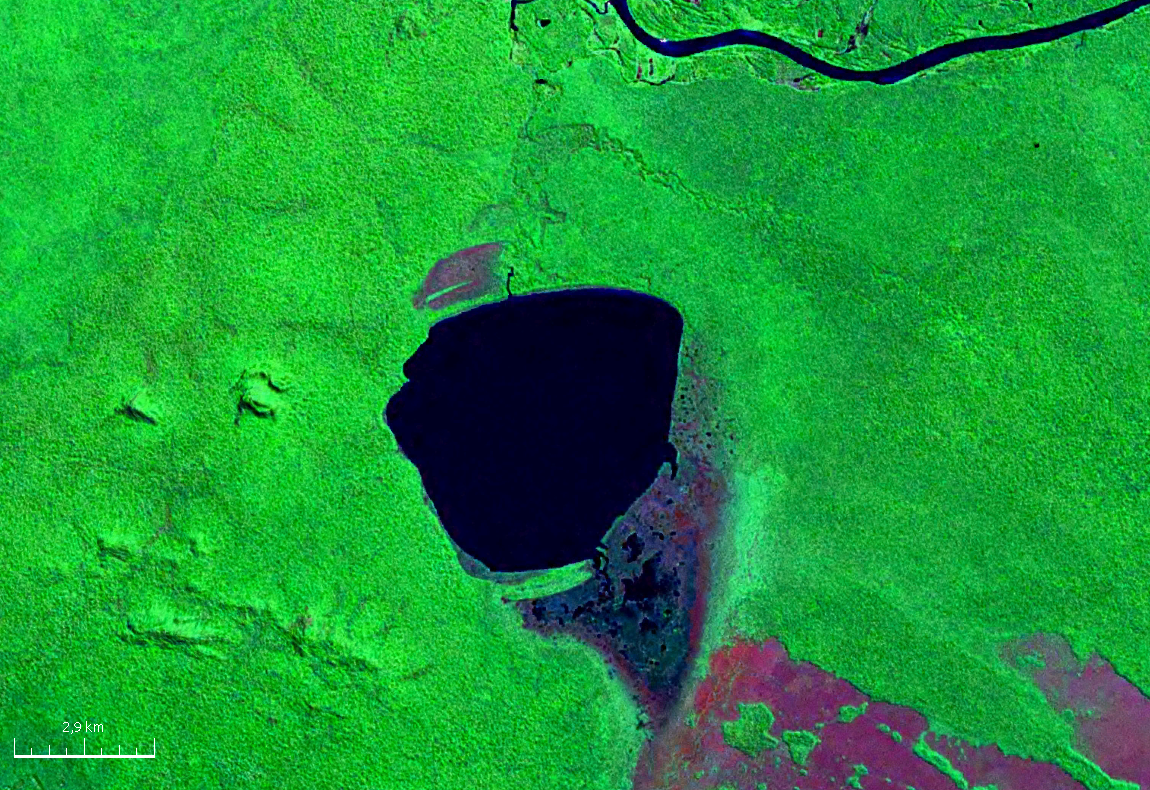
- Satellite photo in false colours

- Location within Bolivia Location within Brazil Location within South America
- Interactive map of Laguna Bellavista
- Location: San Ignacio de Velasco Municipality, José Miguel de Velasco Province, Santa Cruz Department
- Coordinates: 13°36′38″S 61°31′52″W
- Primary outflows: Guaporé River (Río Iténez)
- Basin countries: Bolivia
- Surface area: 24.8 km^{2} (9.6 sq mi)
- Surface elevation: 200 m (660 ft)

Bellavista Lake (Bellavista qucha, Laguna Bellavista) is a lake in the San Ignacio de Velasco Municipality, José Miguel de Velasco Province, Santa Cruz Department, Bolivia. At an elevation of 200 m, its surface area is 24.8 km^{2}.
