= San Ignacio de Velasco Municipality =

Coordinates: 15°00′S 61°00′W

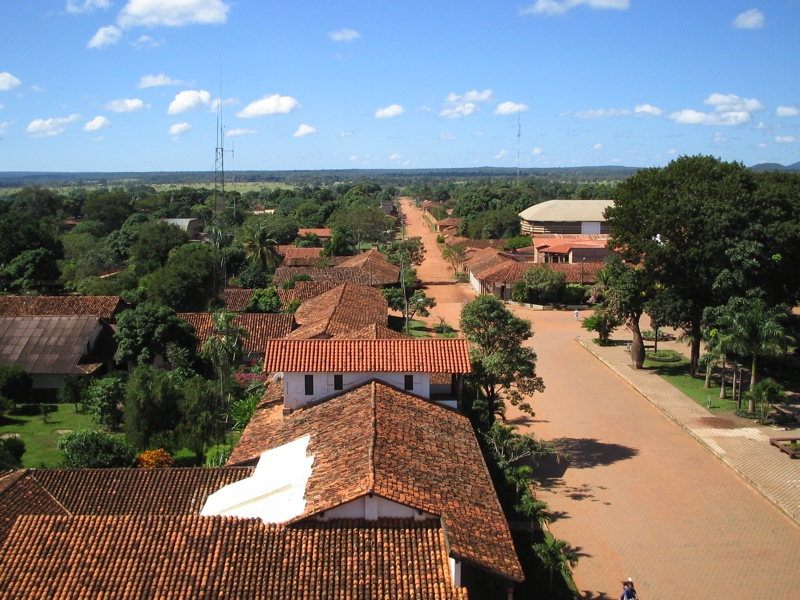
San Ignacio de Velasco

San Ignacio de Velasco Municipality is the first municipal section of José Miguel de Velasco Province in Santa Cruz Department, Bolivia. Its capital is San Ignacio de Velasco. Towns in the municipality include Santa Ana de Velasco.

== Languages ==
The languages spoken in the San Ignacio de Velasco Municipality are mainly Spanish, Chiquitano, and Quechua.

Language	Inhabitants
Quechua	1,291
Aymara	355
Guaraní	68
Another native	1,133
Spanish	37,924
Foreign	736
Only native	308
Native and Spanish	2,411
Only Spanish	35.621

== Places of interest ==
- Laguna Bellavista
- Chaplín Lake
