= Kovareka language =

Extinct Bororoan language of Bolivia

Kovareka
- Covareca
- Native to: Bolivia
- Extinct: after 1831
- Language family: Bororoan: Bororo group; Otuke group; Covareca–Curuminaca; Kovareka

Language codes
- ISO 639-3: None (mis)
- Glottolog: None

Kovareka is an extinct and poorly known Bororoan language of Bolivia, spoken at the Santa Ana de Velasco mission. It is known from only 19 words collected by Alcide d'Orbigny. It is most closely related to Kuruminaka.
