= Kuruminaka language =

Extinct language of Bolivia

Kuruminaka
- Curumina
- Native to: Bolivia
- Region: Casalvasco mission
- Ethnicity: Curuminaca
- Extinct: after 1831
- Language family: Macro-Jê ?: Bororoan; Bororo group; Otuke group; Covareca–Curuminaca; Kuruminaka

Language codes
- ISO 639-3: None (mis)
- Glottolog: None

Kuruminaka (Curuminaca, Curumina) is an extinct and poorly known Bororoan language of Bolivia, formerly spoken by the Curuminaca people. It is very poorly known, with only a wordlist of 14 words preserved.

== Vocabulary ==
Kuruminaka vocabulary
Gloss	Kuruminaka
Bring (it)!	arumatu-ma
Drink!	akututo
good	sĩt-ĩmaxa; iv-amaxa-ra-ha 'I am well'
duck	arumaxiče
bean	karaina
honey	zeru
chicha	i-čoro
How are you?	ama-makene
tortoise	zerikiki
father	čoko
