= Cabaçal River =

Coordinates: 15°59′52″S 57°42′19″W

Location
- Country: Brazil

Physical characteristics
- Source
  - location: Mato Grosso state
- Mouth
  - location: Paraguay River

The Cabaçal River (Portuguese, Rio Cabaçal) is a river of Mato Grosso state in western Brazil. It is a tributary of the Paraguay River.

Bororo of Cabaçal, an indigenous language that is now extinct, was formerly spoken around the river.

== See also ==
- List of rivers of Mato Grosso
