= José Miguel de Velasco Province =

José Miguel de Velasco
- Province
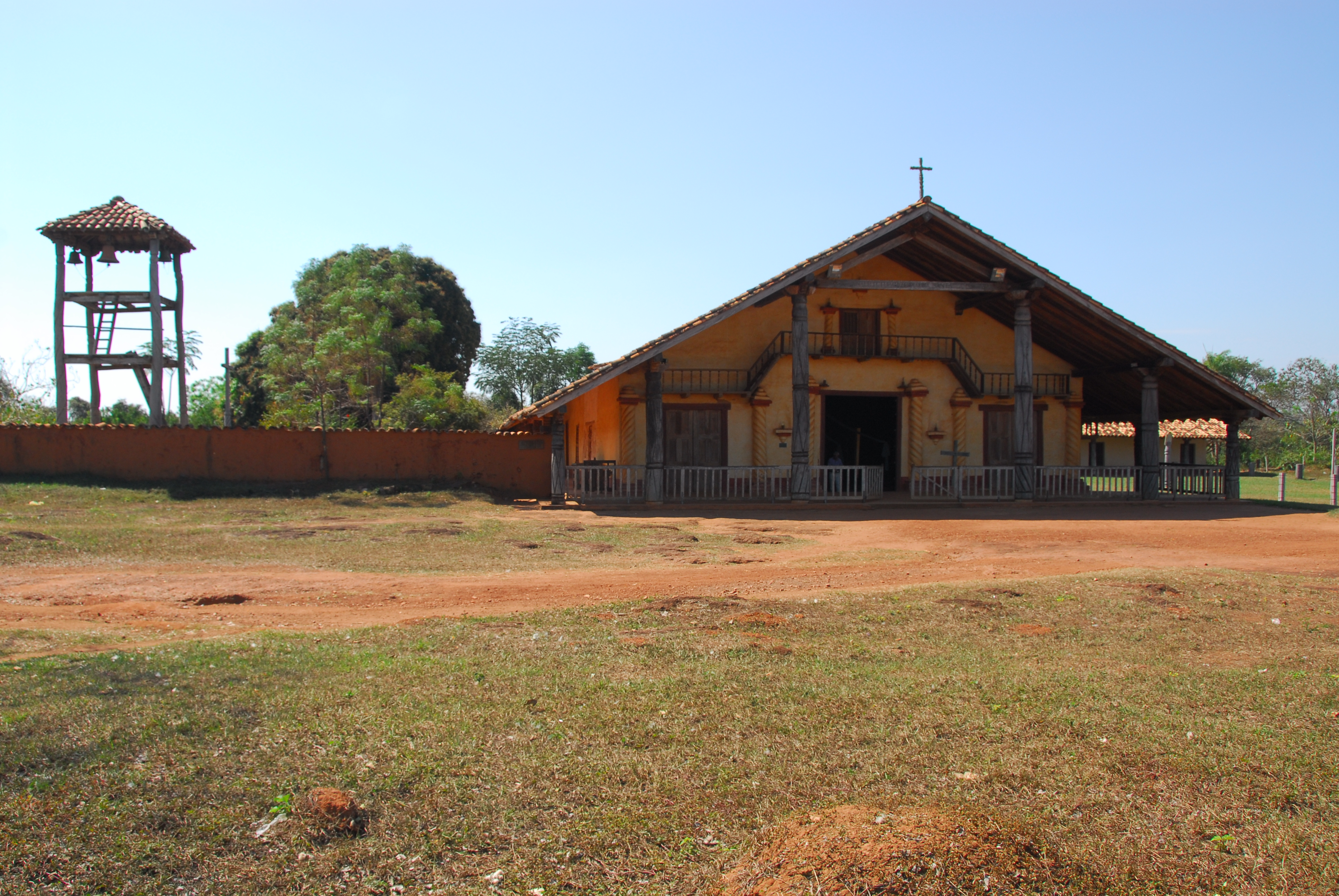
- Mission church in Santa Ana de Velasco, Jesuit Missions of Chiquitos

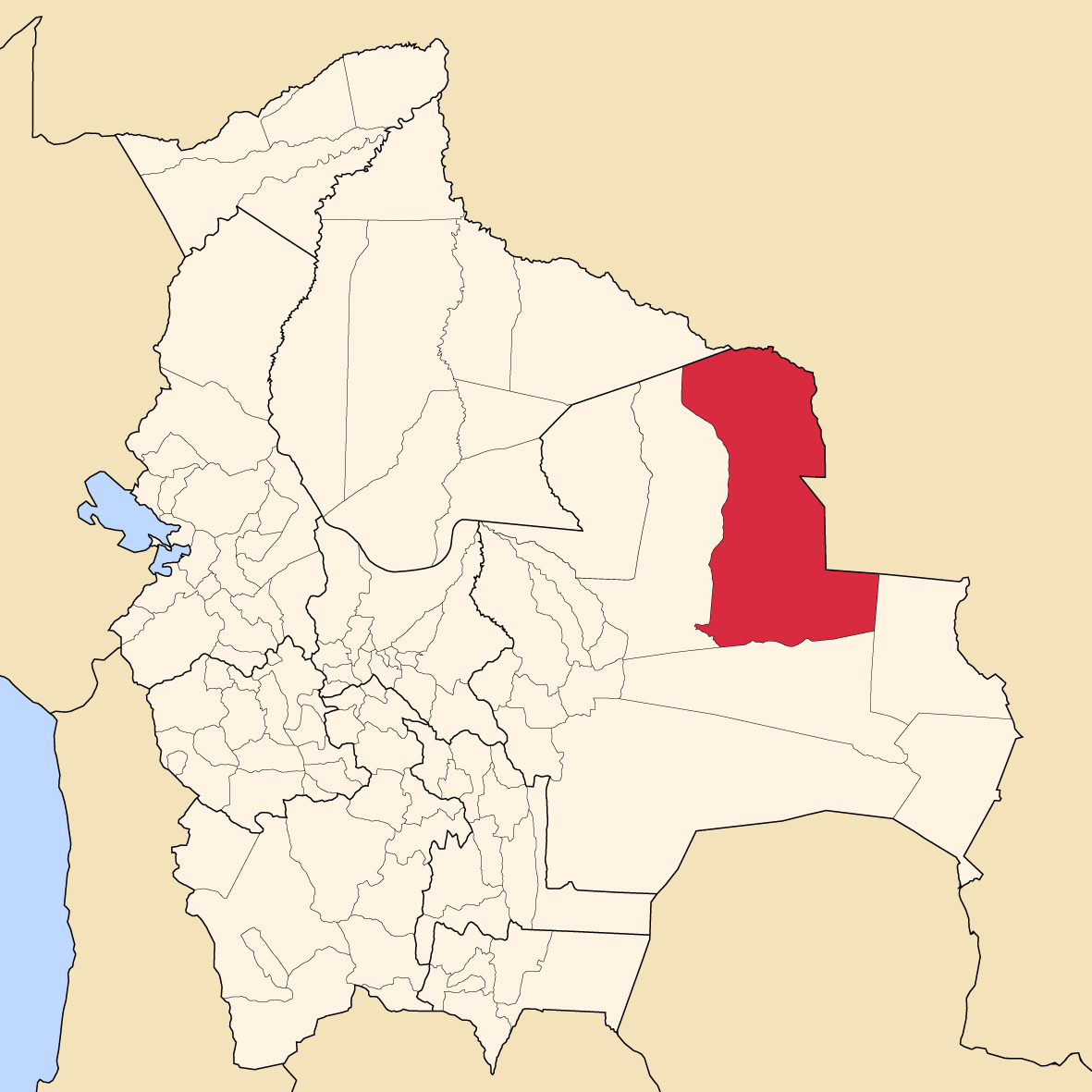
- Location of the José Miguel de Velasco Province within Bolivia

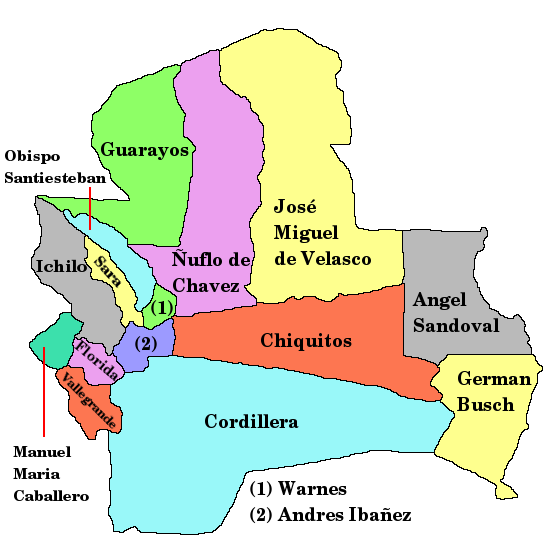
- Provinces of the Santa Cruz Department
- Coordinates: 15°30′0″S 61°0′0″W
- Country: Bolivia
- Department: Santa Cruz Department
- Capital: San Ignacio de Velasco

Area
  - Total: 25,261 sq mi (65,425 km^{2})
- Elevation: 1,329 ft (405 m)

Population (2024 census)
  - Total: 91,573
  - Density: 3.6251/sq mi (1.3997/km^{2})
- Website: www.santacruz.gob.bo

José Miguel de Velasco or Velasco is a province in the Santa Cruz department of Bolivia. Its capital is San Ignacio de Velasco. The province is named after the Bolivian president José Miguel de Velasco Franco. It was created by law on October 12, 1880, during the presidency of Narciso Campero. Until its creation it was integrated into Chiquitos Province.

== Geography ==
Velasco is located between the major Bolivian city of Santa Cruz de la Sierra and the Brazilian border. An unpaved highway connects the province with the city of Santa Cruz to the west and Brazil to the east.

== Demographics ==
The latest census in Bolivia (2024) counted 91,573 people (82,091, aged 4 and over) in the province, out of which 6,214 were German-speaking Mennonites aged 4 and over or 7.6% of the entire population.

== Subdivision ==
José Miguel de Velasco Province is divided into three municipalities which are further subdivided into cantons.

Section	Municipality	Inhabitants (2001)	Seat	Inhabitants (2001)
1st	San Ignacio de Velasco Municipality	41,412	San Ignacio de Velasco	19,401
2nd	San Miguel Municipality	10,273	San Miguel de Velasco	4,484
3rd	San Rafael Municipality	5,017	San Rafael de Velasco	2,057

Towns in the province include Santa Ana de Velasco.

== Culture ==
Velasco features a mestizo culture, blending the culture of the Spanish conquistadors and missionaries with those of the indigenous peoples. Spanish is the most commonly used language in public, though indigenous languages, such as Chiquitano, are also used. Due to the proximity of the province to Brazil, Portuguese speakers can be found, particularly merchants in the city of San Ignacio. There is a small presence of Mennonites and descendants of post-World War II German immigrants.

== Places of interest ==
- San Ignacio de Velasco
- San Miguel de Velasco
- San Rafael de Velasco
- Santa Ana de Velasco

== Gallery ==
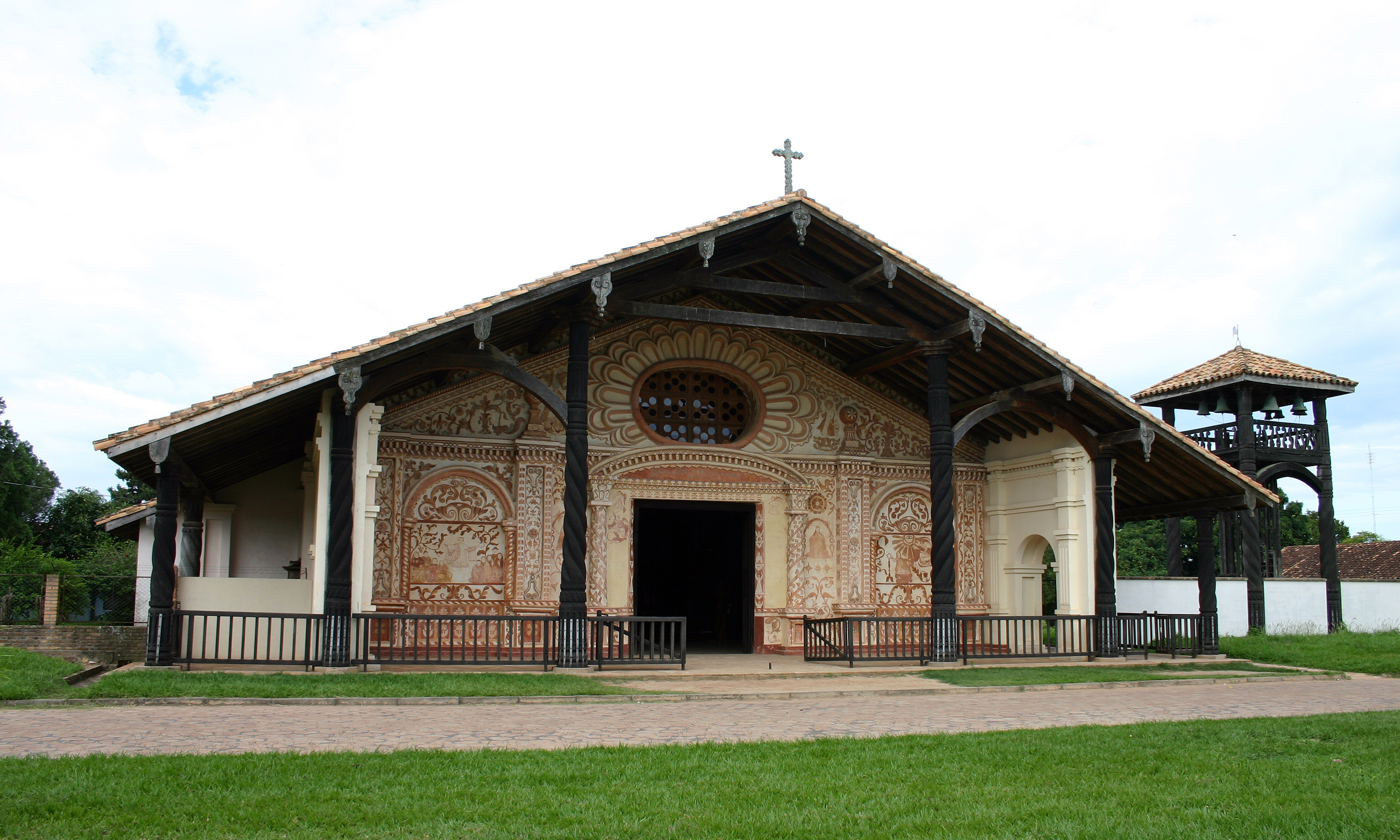
San Rafael de Velasco mission church

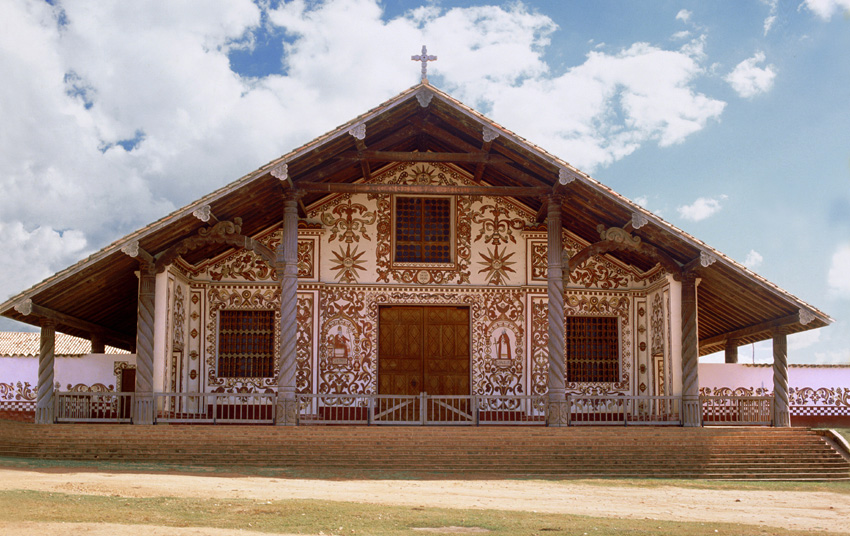
San Miguel de Velasco mission church

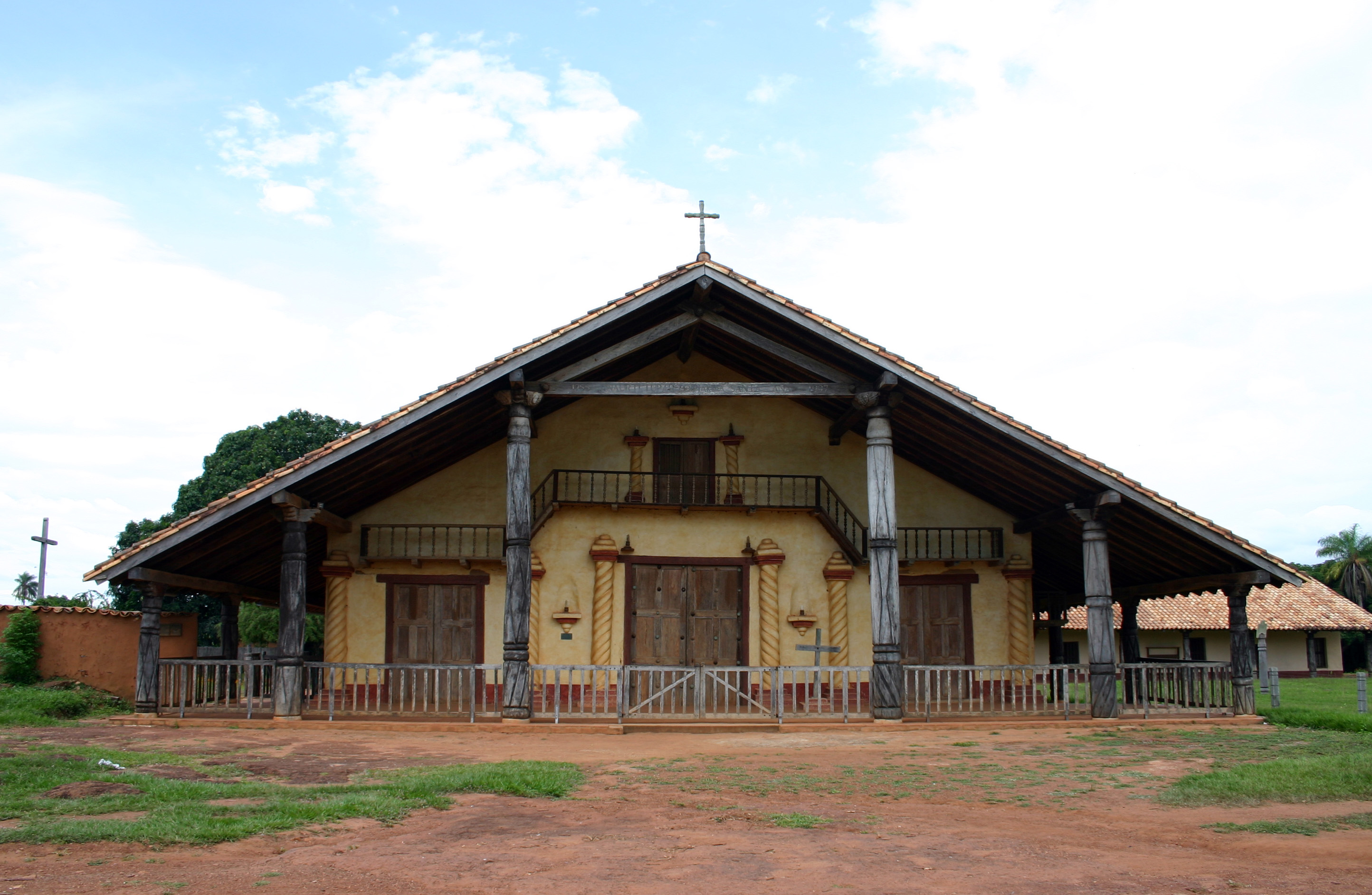
Santa Ana de Velasco mission church

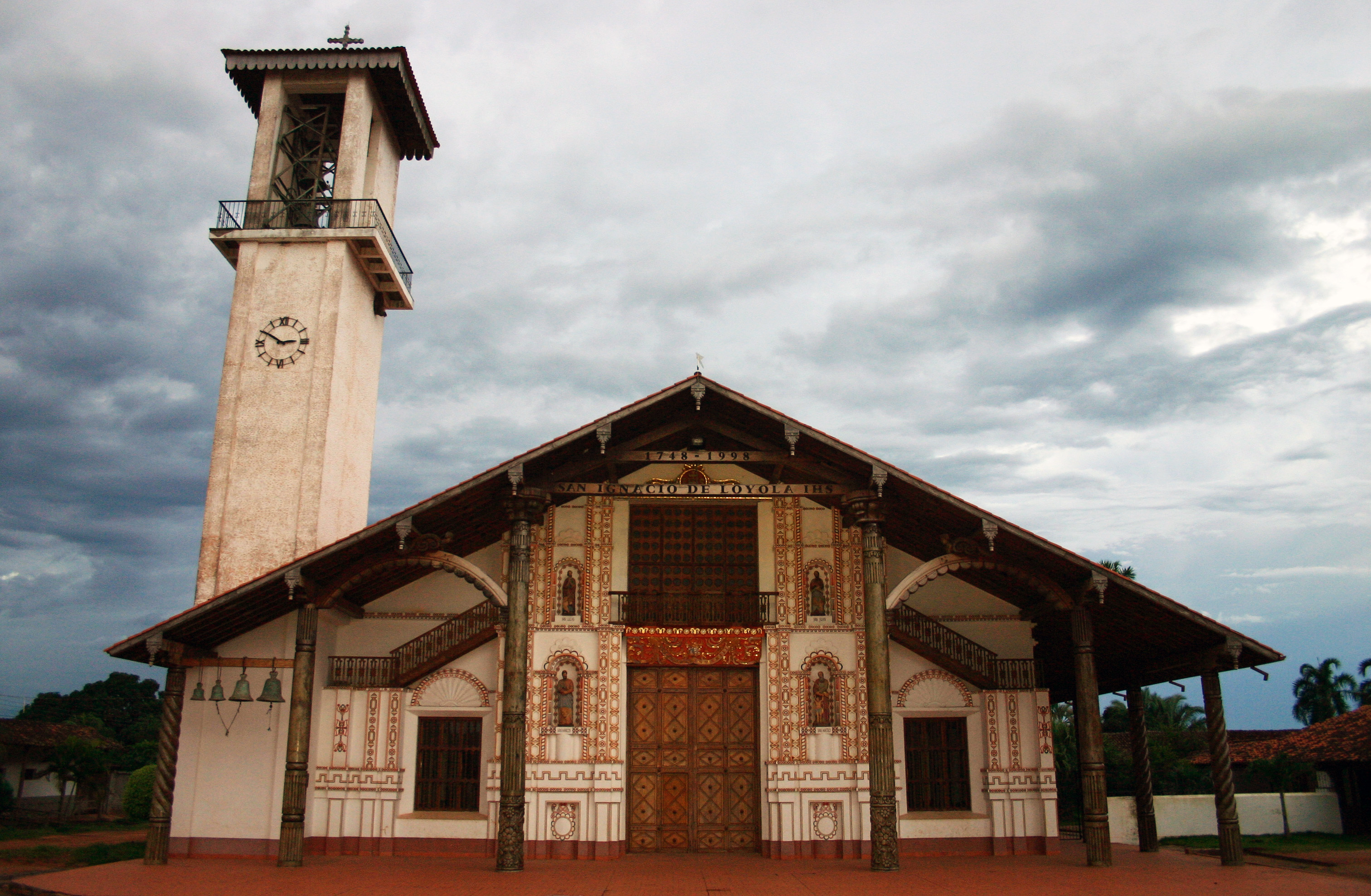
St. Ignatius Cathedral, San Ignacio de Velasco

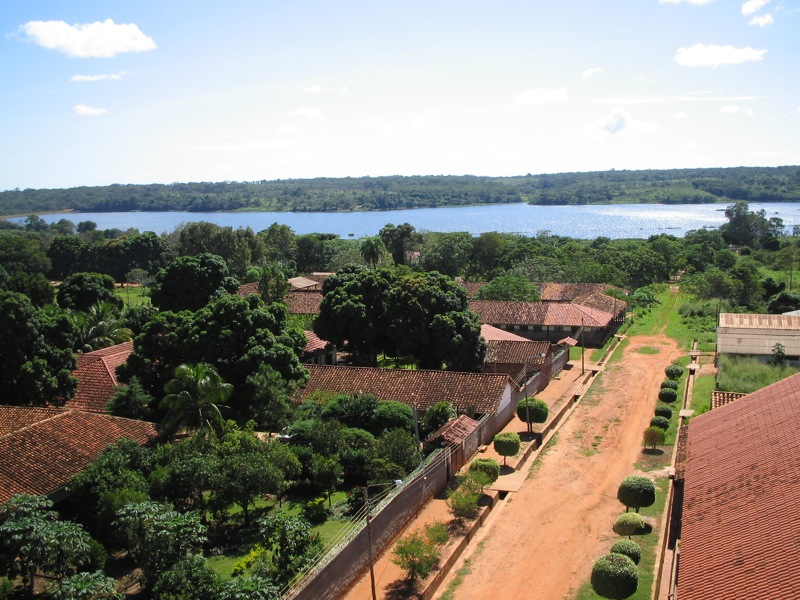
View of San Ignacio de Velasco town

== See also ==
- Jesuit Missions of Chiquitos
- Laguna Bellavista
