= Bororo language =

Language native to Brazil

Borôro
- Boe
- Boe Wadáru, bataru-boe
- Native to: Brazil
- Region: Mato Grosso
- Ethnicity: Bororo
- Native speakers: 1,400 (2007)
- Language family: Macro-Jê ?: Bororoan; Borôro
- Dialects: Boróro (Biriboconé); Orari (Orarimugodoge, Eastern Bororo)

Language codes
- ISO 639-3: bor
- Glottolog: boro1282
- ELP: Bororo

Bororo (Borôro), also known as Boe, is the sole surviving language of the small Bororoan family believed by some to be part of the Macro-Jê languages. It is spoken by the Bororo, hunters and gatherers in the central Mato Grosso region of Brazil.

== Phonology ==
Bororo has a mid-sized phonemic inventory of seven vowels and fifteen consonants. Orthographic representations, when they differ from IPA, are shown in angle brackets (all from Nonato 2008, based on Americanist transcription).

=== Vowels ===
The vowel system of Bororo is somewhat cross-linguistically unusual in that it distinguishes roundedness only in its back vowels (although Crowell (1979) analyzes unrounded “back” vowels as central).

	Front	Back	
	Front	unrounded	rounded
High	i	ɯ ⟨ü⟩	u
Mid	e	ɤ ⟨ö⟩	o
Low	a		

The mid vowels /e ɤ o/ alternate with the open-mid (or "lax") vowels [ɛ ʌ ɔ] in apparent free variation.

The unrounded back vowels /ɯ ɤ/ become central [ɨ ɘ] word-finally. Furthermore, [ɘ] (i.e. word-final /ɤ/) is not distinguished from, and often surfaces as, front [ɛ]. As a result, /ɤ/ and /e/ are at least partially merged word-finally.

==== Diphthongs and long vowels ====
Bororo has a rich inventory of twelve diphthongs:

	-i	-e	-u	-o	-a
a-	ai̯	ae̯	au̯	ao̯	
e-	ei̯			eo̯	e̯a
o-	oi̯	oe̯	ou̯		
ɤ-	ɤi̯				
ɯ-	ɯi̯				

All pure vowels can also occur long, i.e. as /iː eː ɯː ɤː uː oː aː/. In contrast to other languages with phonemic vowel length, however, these are quite rare, and there seems to be no reason to distinguish long vowels from same-vowel sequences. This is evidenced by the mandatory lengthening of monosyllables, where the vowel of a monosyllable is repeated to form a long vowel: for example, /ba/ "village" becomes /baa̯/ [baː].

=== Consonants ===
Unusually for a South American language, Bororo has no phonemic fricatives.

		Bilabial	Alveolar	Palatal	Velar	
		Bilabial	Alveolar	Palatal	plain	labial
Plosive/ Affricate	voiceless	p	t	tʃ ⟨c⟩	k	kʷ ⟨kw⟩
Plosive/ Affricate	voiced	b	d	dʒ ⟨j⟩	g	ɡʷ ⟨gw⟩
Nasal		m	n			
Flap			ɾ ⟨r⟩			
Semivowel				j ⟨y⟩		w

The velar stop /k/ becomes aspirated [kʰ] before nonback vowels /a e i/; the labiovelar approximant /w/ becomes labiodental [ʋ] in the same environment. Plain and labialized velar stops /k g kʷ ɡʷ/ merge as labialized [kʷ ɡʷ] before rounded vowels /u o/. The voiced velar stop /g/ lenites to fricative [ɣ] between vowels.

=== Syllable structure and stress ===
The canonical syllable structure in Bororo is (C)V: that is, a mandatory vowel nucleus (or diphthong), optionally preceded by a single onset consonant. Aside from unmodified loanwords from Portuguese (which are quite common, and becoming more so), Bororo syllables never have onset consonant clusters or codas.

Stress in Bororo occurs generally (again with the exception of unmodified Portuguese loanwords) on the penultimate mora. Since diphthongs contain two morae, this means that a diphthong in either penultimate or final position will generally be stressed: [ˈbai̯ɡa] "bow", [kaˈnao̯] "pimple, scale". Before compounding, however, diphthongs are reanalyzed as a monomoraic syllable, and stress is assigned again to the penultimate syllable of the whole compound: [keˈrakae̯] "finger", from /kera/ "hand" and /kae̯/ "digit".

=== Morphophonology ===
Bororo has a process of stem-initial mutation. When a stem (whether a noun, verb, or preposition) beginning in a consonant takes on a prefix itself containing a consonant, the stem-initial consonant is voiced; for example, kodu "to go" becomes ikodu "I go" with the first person singular (prefix i-) but pagodu "we go" in first person plural inclusive (prefix pa-). In addition, /b/ becomes /w/ and /dʒ/ becomes /j/ when following a prefix, regardless of whether the latter has a consonant or not: bogai "for" becomes iwogai "for me". Stems beginning with /d g m n r j w/ do not undergo any change. This process is part of a wider harmony restriction in Bororo, rare among the world's languages: no word (excluding clitics and compounds) may contain more than one voiceless obstruent.

Meanwhile, a stem beginning in a vowel requires the insertion of a "thematic" consonant to attach a prefix. The consonant used varies both by the prefix and the stem-initial vowel: the first-person singular, first-person plural exclusive, and third-person plural prefixes insert the thematic consonant -t-/-d- before stems beginning in a- or o-, while all other combinations (i.e. other personal prefixes or stem-initial i-; no native stems begin in e- or u-) insert -k-/-g-. For example, whereas ore "children" becomes i-t-ore "my children", iwögü "steal" becomes i-k-iwögü "I steal". A few irregular stems which would be expected to take -t-/-d- instead take -n-: oika "anxiety" becomes inoika "my anxiety", rather than *itoiga or similar. Finally, since vowel-initial stems never take a third-person singular prefix, no thematic vowel is inserted. This process is summarized in the table below.

Thematic consonants
Prefix	Initial vowel		
Prefix	i-	a-, o- (regular)	a-, o- (irregular)
1sg i- 1pl.ex ce- 3pl e-	-k/g- ikiwogu "I steal" cegiwogu "we steal"	-t/d- itore "my children" cedore "our children"	-n- inoika "my anxiety" cenoika "our anxiety"
3sg ∅-	-∅- iwogu "he steals"	-∅- ore "his children"	-∅- oika "his anxiety"
All other prefixes	-k/g- akiwogu "you steal" tagiwogu "you (pl.) steal"	-k/g- akore "your children" tagore "your (pl.) children)	-k/g- akoiga "your anxiety" tagoiga "your (pl.) anxiety"

== Morphology ==
Bororo, like most languages of South America, is synthetic and agglutinative (albeit with some degree of fusion). However, it cannot strictly be labelled "polysynthetic"; it does not make use of incorporation or any other means of particularly extensive derivation. Nominal morphology is fairly simple – on a level comparable with modern Romance languages – and verbal morphology, while somewhat more complex, cannot exceed three or four affixes on any given verb, in sharp contrast to the better-known "polysynthetic" languages of the Americas such as Nahuatl or Mohawk.

Six basic word classes exist in Bororo: nouns and verbs (both open classes) and conjunctions, postpositions, adverbs, and pronouns (all closed). Note that there is no independent class of adjectives; the functions of adjectives in European languages are filled by verbs or nouns in Bororo. This section provides an overview of Bororo morphology as organized by these classes.

=== Nouns ===
There is no category of obligatory nominal affixes in Bororo; a noun phrase may therefore be composed of a single unmarked root.

==== Plurality ====
Most nouns are pluralized by means of a plural suffix, whose most common allomorph is -doge: arigao "dog" pluralizes to arigao-doge "dogs". The other allomorphs are -e (mainly following names of animals, e.g. juko-e "monkeys"), -mage (mainly following kinship terms, e.g. i-rago-mage "my grandchildren") and -ge (mainly following pronouns, e.g. ema-ge "they"). In addition, there is a "zero morpheme" *bo- which can occur only with the plural suffix -e, meaning "things" or "people", hence the Bororos' own term for themselves Boe.

Some nouns, however, are basically plural and require a marked singular suffix -dü. These generally refer to human beings; examples include barae "white people" (baraedü "a white person") and ime "men" (imedü "a man").

==== Diminution and gender ====
Diminution is a productive process in Bororo. The diminutive suffix is -rogu; awagü "snake" therefore may become awagü-rogu "little snake" (Portuguese cobrinha). This has the allomorph -kügüre when attached to a plural noun: awagoe "snakes" (an irregular plural) becomes awagoe-kügüre "little snakes".

Bororo has no obligatory marking of grammatical gender. Many distinctions made by noun gender in Portuguese and other languages with the category are simply made by suppletive forms in Bororo, as in marido/oredüje "husband/wife" (Portuguese esposo/esposa, marido/mulher), or by compounding with the nouns imedü "man" and aredü "woman" – hence tapira imedü "bull" and tapira aredü "cow" from tapira "cattle". However, there is also a feminine derivative suffix -do, which is used with personal names and demonstratives: awü "this", awü-do "this (woman)".

==== Postpositions ====
Bororo uses postpositions rather than prepositions. Notably, these postpositions may be inflected with the same set of bound pronouns as verbs and inalienable possession; for example, ae "to, toward" can become et-ai "to them".

===== Focus =====
One postposition, ji, is used to establish the nominal focus of a sentence – what Crowell (1979) refers to as "range or referent". In some cases, this functions very similarly to focusing prepositions in English: e-mago-re tori ji, "they talked about the mountains". However, the range of ambitransitive verbs in Bororo is much narrower (if indeed ambitransitives exist at all) than in English, and so several verbs which are transitive in English require focusing with -ji in Bororo: imedü jorüdü-re karo ji "the men ate the fish" (compare a-jorüdü-re "you ate"). These verbs – further examples of which are ra "sing", aidü "want", and rö "do" – function exactly as any other intransitive verb in Bororo.

===== Demonstratives =====
Bororo has three degrees of deictic distance: near (a-), medium (no-), and distant (ce-). To modify a noun, these must precede the relative marker -wü: a-wü imedü "this man", ce-wü imedü "that man (over there)". Since Bororo lacks articles, these occasionally take their place, but not nearly as frequently as true articles are used in English or Portuguese.

==== Possession ====
Like many indigenous languages of South America, Bororo distinguishes inclusive and exclusive first-person plurals as well as alienable and inalienable possession. Inalienable possession is the only nominal category marked by prefixes; since these are identical with the pronominal prefixes of verbs, they are listed in the section "Pronouns". The table below provides a list of alienable possessors with the example word tori, "stone":

Alienable possession
	Singular	Plural
1	ino tori "my stone"	pago tori "our stone" (inclusive) ceno tori "our stone" (exclusive)
2	ako tori	tago tori
3	o tori	eno tori
Coreferential	to-dori "(one's) own stone"	
Reciprocal	pu-dori "each other's stone"	

=== Verbs ===
Bororo verbal morphology is basically divided along lines of transitivity. Both transitive and intransitive verbs take the same set of bound pronouns to convey subjects and objects (e.g. i-reru-re, a-reru-re "I danced, you danced" / i-re a-reru-dö "I make you dance"), but each has an exclusive set of suffixes. "Intransitive" suffixes naturally apply to intransitive verbs, for which there is only one core argument – for example, the neutral aspect -re in i-reru-re – but also to the agent of a transitive clause, hence i-re a-reru-dö; meanwhile, "transitive" suffixes can only be applied to the main verb of a transitive clause – e.g. the causative -dö in i-re a-reru-dö. For this reason, the suffixes listed in this section cannot properly be called "verbal" suffixes alone; they are grouped in this section merely for convenience.

==== Intransitive and ergative ====
As mentioned above, these morphemes are suffixed either to the verb of an intransitive clause or to the agent of a transitive clause (A).

===== Aspect =====
Bororo uses six suffixes, as well as a null suffix /-∅/, to convey grammatical aspect: three explicit grammatical aspects, divided into "direct" and "indirect" marking. These are the only strictly mandatory affixes of any kind; they vary in frequency, but all are productive and fairly common. All of these seven options are mutually exclusive.

====== Neutral ======
The most common suffix in Bororo by far is the declarative or "neutral" -re. This suffix conveys a basic and unmarked tense, aspect, and mood for a declarative or interrogative sentence: kowaru kuri-re "the horse is big", kaiba kodu-re "where did he go?" Since it does not convey any tense information, it can be translated as either present or past in English: kowaru kuri-re, for example, could be interpreted either as "the horse is big" or "the horse was big".

====== Stative ======
The stative suffix -nüre indicates that the action described by the verb is either ongoing or essential to the subject: et-ore e-ra-nüre "the children were singing", imedü pega-nüre "the man is (essentially) bad" (contrast with neutral imedü pega-re "the man is bad").

====== Purpose / Hortative ======
The "purpose" suffix -wö indicates that the action in question is the desired result of another (itself usually marked with neutral aspect). This usage always requires a nominalizer dü- and the postposition -bogai, "in order to": i-tu-re a-nudu-wö dü-bogai "I left so that you could sleep" (or "... in order for you to sleep").

This suffix is also used to indicate a hortative mood: pa-goage-wö karo-ji "let's eat the fish". This usage does not require another clause or the dü-bogai construction.

====== Recent ======
Recent aspect is not conveyed with a suffix per se but rather the absence of a suffix; that is, a sentence without an aspect suffix is to be understood as occurring in the present or the recent past. Sentences using the other aspect markers may also be understood as present or recent, but only the absence of a suffix conveys this explicitly: imedü maru-∅ "the man is hunting".

====== Indirect ======
All three explicit aspect suffixes can also be rendered as indirect, meaning that the action they describe was itself described in speech or thought – corresponding broadly to the subjunctive in European languages. Verbs marked as indirect therefore always follow another verb (again usually in the neutral aspect): imedü ako-re awagü pega-ye, "the man said that the cobra was bad / mean". However, direct suffixes may also occur in this context; the indirect only adds an explicit layer of uncertainty or secondhand knowledge. For example, i-mearüdae-re a-mügü-ye means "I thought you were there (but I didn't know)", whereas i-mearüdae-re a-mügü-re would mean "I thought you were there (and so you were)".

There is no independent indirect affix. Instead, the three ordinary aspect suffixes change to apparently-related but historically obscure alternate forms when rendered as indirect. There is no indirect version of the recent aspect -∅; its meaning appears to be covered by the neutral indirect -ye. The direct and indirect aspectual suffixes are compared below.

Aspectual suffixes
Aspect	Direct	Indirect
Neutral	-re	-ye
Stative	-nüre	-yüre
Purpose	-wö	-wöe
Recent	-∅	N/A (-ye)

===== Negative =====
The negative suffix -ka- / -ga- simply negates a verb as in English, and may be followed by any aspect marker: a-reru-re "you danced" becomes a-reru-ka-re "you did not dance". This likewise forms a negative imperative without any special marking or fusion: a-reru-ka-ba "don't dance!"

===== Hypothetical =====
The hypothetical suffix -mödü- indicates that the action is assumed (whether by the speaker or indirectly), but not definitely stated, to have taken place: u-tu-mödü-ka-re "he probably did not go", u-tu-mödü-ye "(someone said that) he did not go". This fuses with the neutral suffix -re to form -möde: u-tu-möde "he probably went".

===== Inchoative =====
The inchoative suffix -gödü indicates that an action is beginning or has begun: meri rekodü-gödü-re "the sun is beginning to set".

==== Transitive ====
These three suffixes apply only to verbs which carries the patient or object of a transitive clause (O).

===== Causative =====
The causative suffix -dö indicates that the subject of the verb causes the main object to perform an action, adding a level of valency: i-re a-tu-dö "I made you go". Theoretically, this suffix could embed new verbs indefinitely: i-re a-dö u-dö e-tu-dö "I made you make him make them go", but as in English it is rare to use more than two degrees.

===== Inceptive =====
The inceptive suffix -gö never occurs independently; it is the result of fusion with the causative. As a result, it has both a strictly inceptive meaning and a causative one, and therefore similarly adds a degree of valency. Several verbs which could be translated with single morphologically simple words in English are formed using this suffix: examples include rüdiwa-gö "to teach", literally "to cause to begin to know" and pemega-gö "to prepare", literally "to cause to begin to be ready / good".

===== Imminent =====
The imminent suffix -yagu indicates that an action is or was about to happen, or alternatively that it is only "nearly" accomplished: a-re a-tu-yagu "you were about to go", e-re tü-yagu pu-reo-re "they are almost alike". This is technically a transitive sentence in Bororo, unlike in English; however, it is restricted entirely to coreferential arguments (i.e. the subject and object are identical).

=== Pronouns ===
Personal pronouns are divided into free and bound forms. Free forms are used to strongly mark a topic (marked by the "fronting" suffix -re: homophonous with but not identical to the declarative re-): imi-re i-tu-re "(as for me,) I'm going". They are also used in "verbless" sentences (for which see below): ema-re-o "here it is / this is it". Bound forms, meanwhile, are used to mark verb subjects and objects, inalienable possession, and postpositional inflection. The full list of free and bound forms (but not alienable possessors, for which see "Possession" above) is shown in the table below.

	Free		Bound	
	Singular	Plural	Singular	Plural
1	imi	pagi (inclusive) cegi (exclusive)	i- (yo-)^{1}	pa- ce-
2	aki	tagi	a	ta-
3	ema	ema-ge	u-, ∅-^{2}	e-
Coreferential	pudumi		tü ~ ci-	
Reciprocal	pugi / pu		pu-	

1. Crowell (1979) references a first-person singular bound form yo- occasionally, but does not provide any description of this form or its use; it may be a typographic error. Nonato (2008) does not record it.
2. U- is used as the third-person bound pronoun as an agentive subject, as the subject of some irregular intransitive verbs (most commonly -tu- "to go") and as the inalienable possessor of some irregular nouns. Otherwise, third person singular is not marked.

== Syntax ==
=== Transitive and intransitive clauses ===
As seen above, a different set of suffixes applies to intransitive verbs and transitive subjects on the one hand, and verbs containing transitive objects on the other. It follows, therefore, that an intransitive clause must contain only a single verb of the former type (e.g. i-reru-re "you dance"), whereas a transitive clause must contain one of each. In the latter case, the "subject" word precedes the "object-verb": for example, a_{1}-re i_{2}-wiye "you_{1} advised me_{2}". The use of bound pronouns is required even if the sentence contains a full noun in either subject or object position: ime e_{1}-re areme e_{2}-wiye, word-for-word "the men they_{1}-did the women them_{2} advise" – "the men advise the women".

Since ambitransitive verbs are at least exceedingly rare in Bororo, however, and intransitives with postpositional focus are very common, the frequency of strictly "transitive" constructions is far fewer than that of English or Portuguese.

=== Yes–no questions ===
Yes–no questions ("did/do..." etc.) follow the same syntactical rules as declarative and imperative clauses in Bororo. Indeed, an interrogative clause may differ from a declarative one only by intonation: ature "you went", ature? "did you go?" However, a yes–no question may also be indicated explicitly by placing the clitic =na immediately after the questioned element: aturena? "did you go?" This clitic is mandatory after a question that contains only a single uninflected word, for example with pronouns: imina? "me?"

=== Informational ("wh-") questions ===
Bororo has six question words, all ending in the interrogative morpheme -ba: kabo-ba "what", yogüdü-ba "who", kakodiwü-ba ’which', ino-ba ’how', kai-ba ’where' and kodi-ba 'why'. If the question element is modified in some way (e.g. by a preposition), the following modifier must itself be marked with -ba: kabo_{1}-ba tabo_{2}-ba imedü maragodü-re "what_{1} did the man work with_{2}?"

As this example illustrates, Bororo makes use of wh-movement. An exception to this rule is pa, an alternative form of kai-ba "where", which follows rather than precedes its subject: imedü pa? "where is the man?"

=== Copular clauses ===
Unlike in English, many well-formed Bororo clauses lack a verb entirely, in which case the first noun (the subject) takes the "intransitive-ergative" suffixes described above. These clauses usually correspond to those formed using the verb "to be" in English: pöbö-re wöe "there is water here", ema-re-o "here it is", etc. Crowell (1979) divides these clauses, which he calls "copulative", into "existential", "equative" and "identificational". Unlike clauses with verbs, these use free pronoun forms exclusively (with the exception of inalienable possession).

Existential clauses denote the existence of their subject, optionally qualified by time and place. These are formed simply by applying the relevant inflection to the noun phrase: karo-re "there are fish / fish exist", karo-re pöbö tada "there are fish in the water", etc. If the subject of these clauses is modified by possession, this is taken as a full possessive statement: i-ke-re, "I have food" (lit. "my food is").

Equative clauses denote an identity between two noun phrases. These are formed by the juxtaposition of two noun phrases, only the first of which is inflected: imedü-re imi, "I am a man". If these noun phrases are modified outside of inflection (e.g. are possessed by a full noun rather than a prefixed pronoun), they require the "complex equative" particle rema (singular) or remage (plural) to end the clause: Kadagare onaregedü-re Creusa rema "Creusa is Kadagare's child".

Identificational clauses are used to present an object within a particular space. These are formed identically to existential clauses, followed by the addition of one of a set of suffixes -o, -no, and -ce, which correspond directly to the deictic prefixes a-, no- and ce-: karo-re-o "here / this is a fish".
