= San Matías Integrated Management Natural Area =

Protected area in Bolivia

Coordinates: 17°34′S 58°45′W

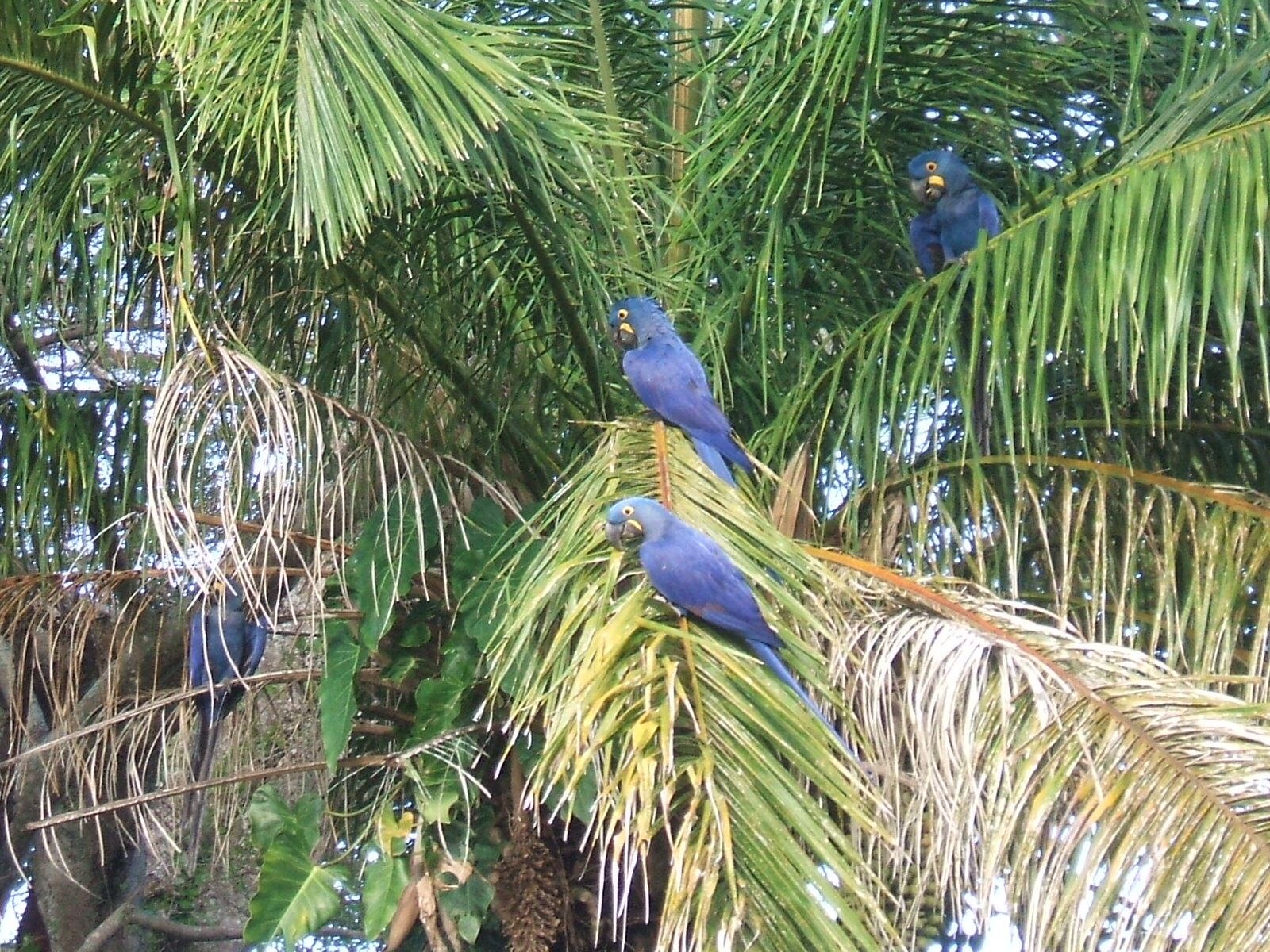
- Hyacinth macaws in the Pantanal
- Interactive map of San Matías Integrated Management Natural Area
- Location: Bolivia; Santa Cruz Department
- Area: 2,918,500 ha (7,212,000 acres)
- Established: 1997
- Governing body: Servicio Nacional de Áreas Protegidas (SERNAP)

San Matías Integrated Management Natural Area (Spanish: Área Natural de Manejo Integrado San Matías, or ANMI San Matías) is a protected area in Bolivia located in the Santa Cruz Department.

== Geography ==
It is located in the east of the Santa Cruz Department of Bolivia. At 2,918,500 hectares, it spans the provinces of Ángel Sandoval, Germán Busch, Chiquitos and Velasco, in the municipalities of San Matías, Puerto Suárez, Puerto Quijarro, San José de Chiquitos and San Rafael. It borders Brazil to the east. It is the second largest protected area in Bolivia.

== History ==
During the installation of a gas pipeline through the ANMI, a large trove of Pre-Columbian artefacts were found, dating from the years 1000 to 1500. There are rock paintings near Laguna Gaiba, to the north of the road from El Carmen to Puerto Suarez, and to the north of the area of Navidad y Las Petas.

The indigenous people of this area are the Ayoreo and Chiquitano.

The area was first protected under Supreme Decree 24124 on 21 September 1995 as Area de Inmovilización-Reserva Biológica San Matías (a Santa Cruz Department designation), with a size of 900,000 ha. On 31 July 1997 Supreme Decree 24734 renamed, reorganised and enlarged the Natural Area, growing it to its modern girth.

During the massive wildfires across Bolivia in 2021, this ANMI was the most impacted of all protected areas; 697,929 hectares had burned by 2021. 916,486 hectares burned in the San Matías Municipality.

== Flora ==
Sixteen main (natural) floral associations have been identified in the ANMI. There are also anthropogenic habitats and open water.

- Four types of chiquitano dry forests.
- Rainforest at the bottom of canyons.
- Cerrado scrublands
- Open savanna, and temporarily inundated savanna
- Taraquizal - a type of swamp forest.
- Taropal - Floating mats of vegetation, Eichornia spp. are locally known as tarope.
- Colchal - Grasslands, with floating mats of vegetation (Salvinia auriculata), dominated by Oxycaryum cubense and Eleocharis acutangula.
- Camalotal - Dominated by water-lilies and underwater aquatic plants, especially Nymphoides grayana, Nymphaea amazonum and Cabomba furcata.
- Junquillar - Floristically poor beds of Thalia geniculata and Cyperus giganteus.
- Arrocillar - 'Rice lands', pantanal-type habitat dominated by grasses, especially the wild rice Oryza latifolia and Leersia hexandra.
- Palm brakes dominated by Copernicia alba with lianas of Machaerium hirtum and a groundcover of Sporobolus indicus.

== Fauna ==
=== Birds ===
The paraba azul (Anodorhynchus hyacinthinus, the hyacinthine macaw) is considered an emblematic symbol of the region. Most of the Bolivian population of this large parrot is thought to be found in this Natural Area, although they likely range northward. They can most often be seen in the cattle ranches in the ANMI. There is an annual macaw festival in the village of San Fernando on 6 August. The population is likely increasing, as the range is expanding and there are more sightings.

Besides the hyacinthine macaw, other birds found here are the piyo (Rhea americana), the stork Jabiru mycteria, a curassow called pava mutún (Mitu tuberosa), Paroaria coronata (a cardinal), Chloroceryle amazona (a kingfisher), the harpy eagle (Harpia harpyja) and the eagle Buteogallus urubitinga. 310 species of bird were registered in the ANMI as of 2018. The reserve has been designated an Important Bird Area (IBA) by BirdLife International because it supports significant populations of many bird species.

=== Mammals ===
Typical mammals of the ANMI San Matías are the giant otter Pteronura brasiliensis, marsh deer or ciervo de los pantanos (Blastocerus dichotomus), pampas deer (Ozotoceros bezoarticus), manechi or black howler monkey (Alouatta caraya) and the peccaries pecarí (Tayassu pecari) and taitetú (T. tajacu). Other of 90 species which have been reported as present are tigres or jaguars (Panthera onca), ocelot (Leopardus pardalis), the maned wolf or borochi (Chrysocyon brachyurus), tapir (Tapirus terrestris), huaso (Mazama americana) and urina (M. gouazoubira) deer, jochi calucha or agouti (Dasyprocta punctata), jochi pintado or paca (Cuniculus paca), the pejichi or giant armadillo (Priodontes maximus) and the tatú armadillo Dasypus novemcinctus. There are eight species present which are included in the 2009 Libro Rojo de la Fauna Silvestre de Bolivia. Two are endangered, the bat Lonchorhina aurita and the giant otter, and the other six are considered vulnerable: marsh deer, pampas deer, jaguar, tapir, maned wolf, giant armadillo and the armadillo Tolypeutes matacus (tatú bola).

=== Reptiles and amphibians ===
Typical reptiles found here are the yacaré or caiman Caiman yacare, the tortoises Geochelone carbonaria and G. denticulata, the sicurí (anaconda) Eunectes notaeus, Boa constrictor and the rattlesnake Crotalus durissus. 42 amphibian and 49 reptile species were registered in the ANMI as of 2018. The yacaré population in the ANMI San Matías is harvested for its hides according to a sustainable culling program, in collaboration with WWF Bolivia, claimed to be the first of its type in Bolivia. The animals are often hunted by locals for use in traditional cuisine.

=== Fish ===
The large catfish Zungaro jahu occurs here. 128 fish species were registered in the ANMI as of 2018.

== People ==
There were 155 properties in the park when the first management plan for the area was compiled, the majority were cattle ranches, with an estimated 100,000 head of cattle in the ANMI. There are nine forestry concessions within the park, one is in the centre. Approximately 6,000 people reside within the ANMI, of which the majority are under 15. These live in 17 communities, and the majority are of Ayoreo and Chiquitano ethnicity. There are numerous towns of a few thousand people in the buffer zone around the ANMI.

== Management ==
The director is Marcel Caballero, a biologist, as of 2018.

== Tourism ==
The dry season (June to November) is the best time for tourism, as the land is not flooded and the roads stable.

It can be reached from Santa Cruz by road, air or boat. The road runs through the towns of San José de Chiquitos, Roboré, El Carmen and Puerto Suárez. The road from Roboré to San Matías is said to be a scenic route. There are daily flights from Santa Cruz to Puerto Suárez, and there are three much closer villages with airstrips for small planes in the area: Rincón del Tigre, Santo Corazón and San Fernando. There is also a train which departs daily from Santa Cruz to Puerto Quijarro, passing through San José de Chiquitos, Robore, El Carmen Rivero Torrez and Puerto Suárez.

There is a village in the east of the ANMI, Santo Corazón, where tourists can meet Ayoreo and Chiquitano people.
