= Chiquitano (disambiguation) =

The Chiquitano are an indigenous people of Bolivia and Brazil.

Chiquitano may also refer to:

- Chiquitano language, the language of the Chiquitano people
- Chiquitano dry forests, a dry forest region of Bolivia and Brazil
- Chiquitano (beetle), a genus of beetles in the tribe Ibidionini.

== See also ==
- Chiquitania, a tropical savanna region in Bolivia
