= Chiquitania =

Region of tropical savannas in Bolivia

Coordinates: 18.000°S 60.000°W

Map of the ecoregion

Chiquitania ("Chiquitos" or "Gran Chiquitania") is a region of tropical savannas in the Santa Cruz Department in eastern Bolivia.

== Geography ==
"Chiquitos" is the colonial name for what is now essentially five of the six provinces that make up the Chiquitania, a region in Bolivia's Santa Cruz department. "Chiquitos" refers to a region, not a tribe.

Today, the Chiquitania lies within five provinces of Santa Cruz Department: Ángel Sandoval, Germán Busch, José Miguel de Velasco, Ñuflo de Chávez and Chiquitos province.

== Peoples ==
One of the many tribes inhabiting Chiquitos were the Chiquitano, who still speak the Chiquitano language today.

== Languages ==
Languages historically spoken in the Chiquitania included:

- Chiquitano
- Gorgotoqui (extinct)
- Otuke (extinct)
- Ayoreo
- Guarani

Today, Camba Spanish is the main vernacular lingua franca.

== Missions ==
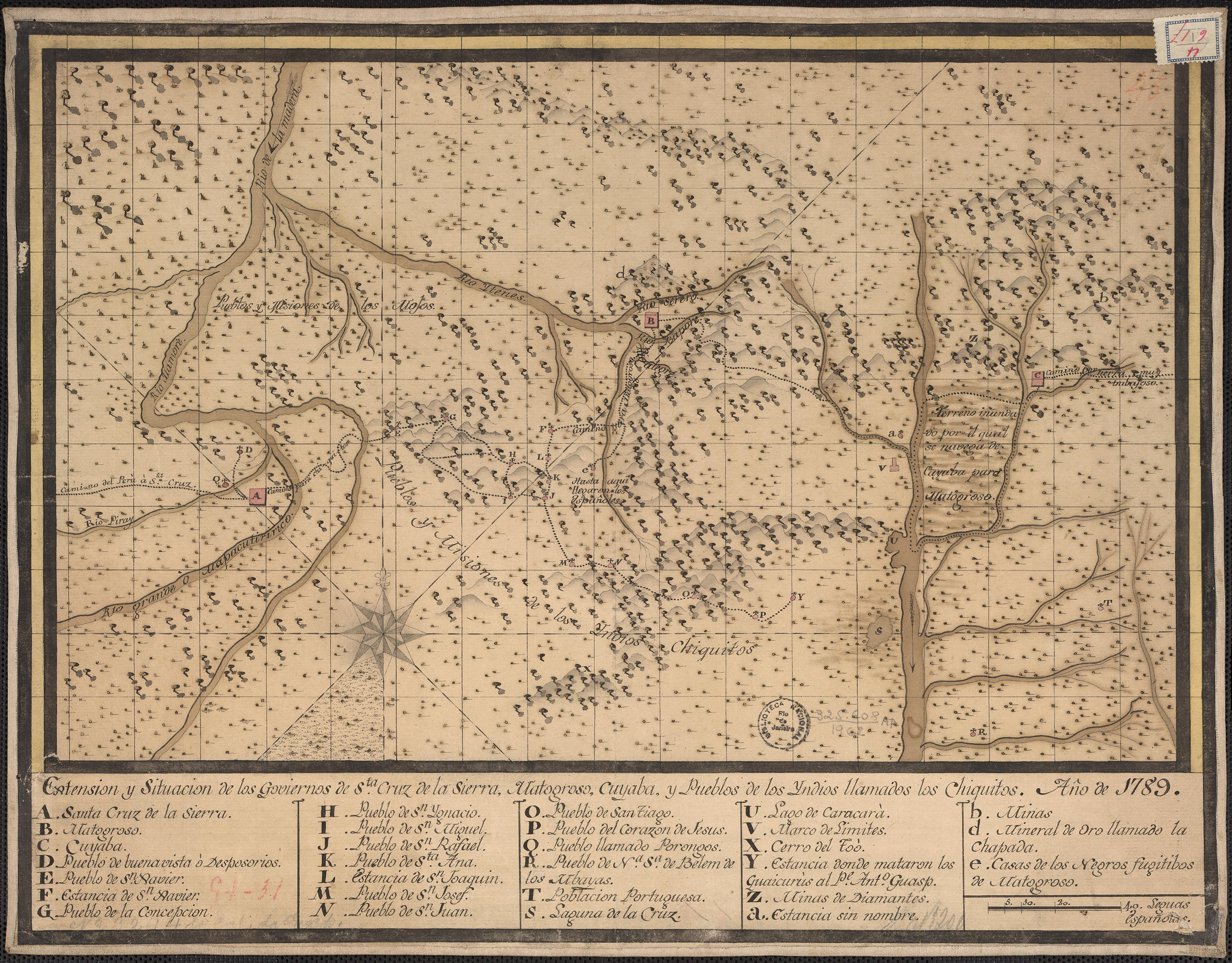
Map of Chiquitania from 1789

A notable feature are the 18th-century Jesuit reductions and Franciscan settlements scattered throughout the region. Six churches still remain in the zone and were selected in 1990 as UNESCO World Heritage Sites under the name Jesuit Missions of the Chiquitos.

== Ecosystem ==
The Chiquitano dry forest is the ecosystem which connects South America's two largest biomes, the Amazon and the Gran Chaco, a dense dry forest of thorn-covered trees and scrub that extends south into Paraguay and Brazil.

== See also ==
- Jesuit Reductions
- List of the Jesuit Missions of Chiquitos
- Beni savanna
- Mamoré–Guaporé linguistic area
