= Chiquitano =

Indigenous people of Bolivia and Brazil

Chiquitano Monkoka
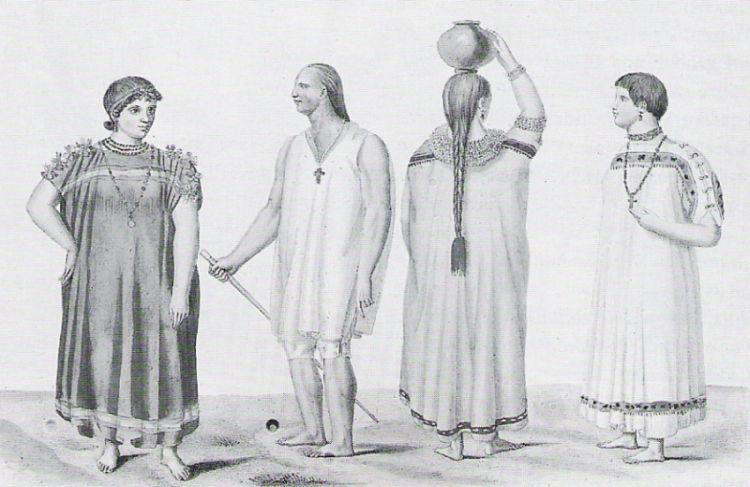
- Drawing of typical Chiquitano dress, by Alcide d'Orbigny, 1831

Total population
- 88,358 (2012)

Regions with significant populations
- Santa Cruz Department, Beni: 87,885 (2012): Bolivia
- Mato Grosso: 473 (2012): Brazil

Languages
- Chiquitano, Spanish, Portuguese

Religion
- Traditional tribal religion, Christianity

The Chiquitano or Chiquitos are an Indigenous people of Bolivia, with a small number also living in Brazil. The Chiquitano primarily live in the Chiquitania tropical savanna of Santa Cruz Department, Bolivia, with a small number also living in Beni Department and in Mato Grosso, Brazil. In the 2012 census, self-identified Chiquitanos made up 1.45% of the total Bolivian population or 145,653 people, the largest number of any lowland ethnic group. A relatively small proportion of Bolivian Chiquitanos speak the Chiquitano language. Many reported to the census that they neither speak the language nor learned it as children. The Chiquitano ethnicity emerged among socially and linguistically diverse populations required to speak a common language by the Jesuit Missions of Chiquitos.

== Name ==
The Chiquitos refer to themselves as the Monkóx (plural: Monkoka). The name Chiquitos means "little ones" in Spanish. This ethnonym is commonly said to have been chosen by the Spanish Conquistadores, when they found the small doors of the Indian huts in the region. The Chiquitanos are also known as the Chiquito or Tarapecosi people.

== Language ==
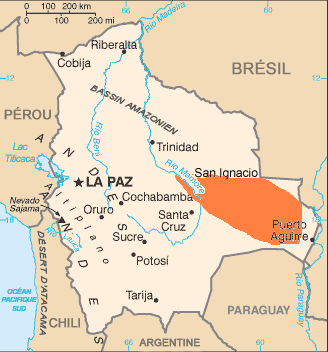
Region where Chiquitano language is commonly spoken

Approximately 40,000 to 60,000 of Chiquitanos speak the Chiquitano language in Bolivia, making it the fourth most commonly spoken indigenous language in that country. The language is a Chiquito language, possibly belonging to the Macro-Jê language family. Men's and women's speech differ from each other grammatically. The language is written in the Latin script. Several grammars for Chiquitano have been published, and four dialects have been identified: Manasi, Peñoqui, Piñoco, and Tao.

== History ==
A variety of indigenous ethnic groups inhabited the Chiquitanía prior to Spanish arrival, which was marked by the 1559 founding of Santa Cruz de la Sierra at a point far to the east of the city's present location. Missionary contact was unsuccessful during the first nine decades of the 1600s.

The following list of Jesuit and pre-Jesuit-era historical dialect groupings of Chiquitano is from Nikulin (2019), after Matienzo et al. (2011: 427–435) and Hervás y Panduro (1784: 30). The main dialect groups were Tao, Piñoco, and Manasi.

Tao subgroups
Subgroup	Location(s)
Aruporé, Bohococa (Bo(h)oca)	Concepción
Bacusone (Basucone, Bucofone, Bucojore)	San Rafael
Boro (Borillo)	San José, San Juan Bautista, Santo Corazón
Chamaru (Chamaro, Xamaru, Samaru, Zamanuca)	San Juan Bautista
Pequica	San Juan Bautista, afterwards San Miguel
Piococa	San Ignacio, Santa Ana
Piquica	east of the Manasicas
Purasi (Puntagica, Punasica, Punajica, Punaxica)	San Javier, Concepción
Subareca (Subarica, Subereca, Subercia, Xubereca)	San Javier
Tabiica (Tabica, Taviquia)	San Rafael, San Javier
Tau (Tao, Caoto)	San Javier, San José, San Miguel, San Rafael, San Juan Bautista, Santo Corazón
Tubasi (Tubacica, Tobasicoci)	San Javier, afterwards Concepción
Quibichoca (Quibicocha, Quiviquica, Quibiquia, Quibichicoci), Tañepica, Bazoroca	unknown

Piñoco subgroups
Subgroup	Location(s)
Guapa, Piñoca, Piococa	San Javier
Motaquica, Poxisoca, Quimeca, Quitaxica, Zemuquica, Taumoca	? San Javier, San José, San José de Buenavista or Desposorios (Moxos)

Manasi subgroups
Subgroup	Location(s)
Manasica, Yuracareca, Zibaca (Sibaca)	Concepción
Moposica, Souca	east of the Manasicas
Sepe (Sepeseca), Sisooca, (?) Sosiaca	north of the Manasicas
Sounaaca	west of the Manasicas
Obariquica, Obisisioca, Obobisooca, Obobococa, Osaaca, Osonimaca, Otaroso, Otenenema, Otigoma	northern Chiquitanía
Ochisirisa, Omemoquisoo, Omeñosisopa, Otezoo, Oyuri(ca)	northeastern Chiquitanía
Cuzica (Cusica, Cusicoci), Omonomaaca, Pichasica, Quimomeca, Totaica (Totaicoçi), Tunumaaca, Zaruraca	unknown

The Chiquitos were a powerful people. They practiced agriculture and resisted the Spaniards for nearly two centuries. In 1691, Jesuits set up missions in their territory and many of them were converted. The converts adopted the Chiquito language as their means of communication, and their numbers soon reached 50,000, assimilating nearly fifty tribes.

The formative experience of the Chiquitano ethnicity was their common evangelization and confinement to towns under the authority of Jesuit missionaries from their 1692 arrival at San Javier de los Piñocas (in what is now Ñuflo de Chávez Province) until their 1767 expulsion from Spanish colonial possessions. Missions governed settlements known as reductions at San Javier de los Piñocas, Concepción, San Ignacio, Santa Ana, San Rafael, San José, San Juan, Santiago, Santo Corazón, and San Miguel. Each mission town incorporated one to three thousand residents. Jesuits emphasized prayer and work as the main activities of a worthy life. They promoted permanent settlements, cattle husbandry, and loom-based weaving as aspects of economic life. The reductions also began a centuries-long pattern of Chiquitano Indian labor benefiting outsiders. During the mission period, Chiquitanos were also recruited as soldiers in Spanish colonial wars. Swedish anthropologist Erland Nordenskiöld described the Jesuit legacy as follows: "The Jesuits protected the Indians from other whites, but divested them of their freedom and made them so dependent that after the expulsion of the missionaries they were easy prey for unscrupulous whites. Actually they set the stage for the extinction of many Indian tribes."

Following the Jesuits' expulsion, some Chiquitanos were incorporated into mestizo-owned ranches and farms, where they served as unfree laborers; others retreated from the villages, living in smaller camps. The rubber boom across South America brought a new industry to the region from 1880 to 1945, staffed once again by Chiquitano laborers. Work was often involuntary, and the conditions extremely harsh, resulting in deaths from workplace accidents, malnutrition, "diseases such as malaria, beriberi, and scurvy; and the overall exploitative practices of the whites." As rubber workers, Chiquitanos experienced debt peonage and forced labor, but were primarily rented out by wealthy mestizos on whom they were dependent. Chiquitanos also built parts of the Santa Cruz–Corumbá Railway under this arrangement.

== Political organization ==
Flag of Organización Indígena Chiquitana

In Bolivia, the Chiquitano people are represented by the organization Chiquitano Indigenous Organization (Organización Indígena Chiquitana, OICH). OICH is led by José Bailaba, who serves as Cacique Mayor.

In Brazil, the Chiquitano are trying to obtain their own indigenous territory.

== See also ==
- Jesuit Missions of Chiquitos
- List of the Jesuit Missions of Chiquitos
