= San Matías =

San Matías may refer to:

- San Matías, Honduras
- San Matías, Santa Cruz, Bolivia
- San Matías, La Libertad, El Salvador
- San Matías Municipality, Santa Cruz, Bolivia
- San Matías, Taco, Santa Cruz de Tenerife
