= Migueleño =

Migueleño may refer to:

- Salinan people and Salinan language
- Migueleño Chiquitano, a variety of Chiquitano

== See also ==
- Wanyam language, with a dialect called Migueleno
