= San Rafael Municipality =

San Rafael Municipality may refer to:

- San Rafael Municipality, Santa Cruz, Bolivia
- San Rafael, Antioquia, Colombia
- San Rafael Municipality, Lempira, surrounding San Rafael, Lempira, Honduras
- San Rafael Municipality, Veracruz, Mexico
