= Alveolo-palatal consonant =

Type of consonant

In phonetics, alveolo-palatal (alveolopalatal, alveo-palatal or alveopalatal (Note: The term alveopalatal or alveo-palatal was traditionally synonymous with palato-alveolar, but may also be synonymous with alveolo-palatal.)) consonants, sometimes synonymous with pre-palatal consonants, are intermediate in articulation between the coronal and dorsal consonants, or which have simultaneous alveolar and palatal articulation. In the official IPA chart, alveolo-palatals would appear between the retroflex and palatal consonants, but are omitted for "lack of space". Ladefoged & Maddieson (1996) characterize the alveolo-palatals as palatalized laminal postalveolars, articulated with the blade of the tongue behind the alveolar ridge and the body of the tongue raised toward the palate, whereas Catford (1982) [1977] describes them as advanced palatals (pre-palatals), the furthest front of the dorsal consonants, articulated with the body of the tongue approaching the alveolar ridge, and Esling (2010) describes them as somewhere between these two articulations, noting the difficulty in distinguishing them. They are front enough that the fricatives and affricates are sibilants, the only sibilants among the dorsal consonants (if considered as dorsal).

According to Recasens (2013), alveolo-palatal consonants are realized through the formation of a simultaneous closure or constriction at the alveolar and palatal zones with a primary articulator which encompasses the blade and the tongue dorsum. Their place of articulation may include the postalveolar zone and the prepalate, but also a larger contact area extending towards the front alveolar zone and the back palate surface. The tongue tip is bent downwards and the tongue dorsum is raised and fronted during the production of these consonants.

== Sibilants ==
The alveolo-palatal sibilants are often used in varieties of Chinese such as Mandarin, Hakka, and Wu, as well as other East Asian languages such as Japanese and Korean, Tibeto-Burman such as Tibetan and Burmese as well as Tai languages such as Thai, Lao, Shan and Zhuang. Alveolo-palatal sibilants are also a feature of many Slavic languages, such as Polish, Russian, and Serbo-Croatian, and of Northwest Caucasian languages, such as Abkhaz and Ubykh. The alveolo-palatal consonants included in the International Phonetic Alphabet are:

| Historical IPA | Modern IPA | Description | Example | | | |
| Historical IPA | Modern IPA | Description | Language | Orthography | IPA | Meaning |
|---|---|---|---|---|---|---|
| ɕ | | Voiceless alveolo-palatal sibilant | Mandarin | 小 (xiǎo) | [ɕiɑu˨˩˦] | Small/little |
| ʑ | | Voiced alveolo-palatal sibilant | Polish | zioło | [ʑɔwɔ] | herb |
| ʨ | t͡ɕ (t̠͡ɕ, c̟͡ɕ) | Voiceless alveolo-palatal affricate | Serbo-Croatian | kuća / кућа | [kut͡ɕa] | house |
| ʥ | d͡ʑ (d̠͡ʑ, ɟ̟͡ʑ) | Voiced alveolo-palatal affricate | Japanese | 地震 (jishin) | [d͡ʑiɕĩɴ] | earthquake |

Some phoneticians may consider [ɕ] and [ʑ] to be equivalent to [ʃ̻ʲ] and [ʒ̻ʲ], or [s̠ʲ] and [z̠ʲ], though others may still maintain a distinction (palatal approximant-like release versus coarticulated palatalization). They are the sibilant homologues of the non-sibilant pre-palatal fricatives [ç˖] and [ʝ˖].

== Stops, nasals, and liquids ==
Symbols for alveolo-palatal consonants are sometimes used in Sinological circles (a circumflex accent is also sometimes seen), but they are not officially recognized by the IPA, though they do occasionally appear in JIPA publications. In standard IPA, they can be transcribed as ⟨t̠ʲ d̠ʲ n̠ʲ l̠ʲ⟩ (retracted and palatalized alveolars) or ⟨c̟ ɟ᫈ ɲ᫈ ʎ̟⟩ (advanced palatals).

For example, the Polish nasal represented with the letter ń is a palatalized laminal alveolar nasal and thus often described as alveolo-palatal rather than palatal. The "palatal" consonants of Indigenous Australian languages are also often closer to alveolo-palatal in their articulation.

| Para-IPA | IPA | Description | Example | | | |
| Para-IPA | IPA | Description | Language | Orthography | IPA | Meaning |
|---|---|---|---|---|---|---|
| ȶ | t̠ʲ, c̟ | Voiceless plosive | Korean | 티끌 tikkeul | [t̠ʲʰiʔk͈ɯl] | 'dust' |
| ȡ | d̠ʲ, ɟ᫈ | Voiced plosive | Korean | 반디 bandi | [b̥ɐnd̠ʲi] | 'firefly' |
| ȵ | n̠ʲ, ɲ᫈ | Voiced nasal | Nuosu | ꑌ nyi | [n̠ʲi˧] | 'sit' |
| ȵ̊ | n̠̊ʲ, ɲ̟̊ | Voiceless nasal | Lower Xumi | | [ʃɐ̃˦ɲ̟̊ɛ˦] | 'clean' |
| ȴ | l̠ʲ, ʎ̟ | Voiced lateral | Catalan | ull | [ˈul̠ʲ] | 'eye' |
| ȴ̊ | l̠̊ʲ, ʎ̟̊ | Voiceless lateral | Upper Xumi | | [ʎ̟̊ɛ˦] | 'flavorless' |

=== Contrast with palatovelars ===
In Migueleño Chiquitano, phoneme /ȶ/ contrasts with phoneme /c̠/; in the syllabic coda (or intervowel) position in conservative Irish, laminal alveolo-palatal phoneme /ṉʲ/ (termed fortis slender coronal nasal, orthographic example inn) contrasts with both dorsal palatal phoneme /ɲ/ (termed slender dorsal nasal, orthographic example ing or -nc-) and apical palatalized alveolar phoneme /nʲ/ (termed lenis slender coronal nasal, orthographic example in); while general Irish other than Munster Irish contrasts alveolo-palatal nasal only with palatal nasal. In both cases, the palatal consonants work as the palatalization of velar consonants while alveolo-palatal consonants work as the palatalization of alveolar consonants.

In some spoken Chinese varieties, such as the Luchuan Hakka in Hengshan, contrast the alveolo-palatal nasal with the palato-velar nasal. For example, the following contrasting pairs can be found in Luchuan Ngai.

Luchuan Ngai contrasting pairs
| EMC | Character | Pronunciation | Tone |
|---|---|---|---|
| newH | 尿 | niau | 去 |
| nraewX | 撓 | niau | 阳平 |
| nyew | 饒 | ȵiau | 阳平 |
| ngewH | 澆 | ɲ̠iau | 上 |
| nrjem | 黏 | niam | 阴平 |
| nyemX | 染 | ȵiam | 上 |
| ngjaem | 嚴 | ɲ̠iam | 阳平 |
| nyin | 人 | ȵin | 阳平 |
| nyin | 仁 | ɲ̠in | 阳平 |

Although a number of spoken Chinese varieties, such as standard Mandarin, also contrast EMC alveolo-palatal nasal with velar nasal of class III (palatalizing medial), most don't contrast them in a way that alveolo-palatal differs from palatal. For example, in Pianlian Hakka, alveolo-palatal nasal marginally contrasts with velar nasal under close front medials, but there is little sign of palatal contrasts.

M pairs
| EMC | Character | Pronunciation | Tone |
|---|---|---|---|
| nrjep | 聶 | niap | 阳 |
| nrjep | 鑷 | ȵiap | 阳 |
| nyip | 入 | ȵap | 阳 |
| net | 捏 | ŋiap | 阳 |

Thus most frequently, the Sinologist use of ȵ instead of ɲ is not to indicate a contrast, but to emphasize its primary allophone not to be the Turkish [ɲ], or to indicate its coronal origin or that it has evolved with other dorsal consonants which have become alveolopalatals, where ɲ is reserved for postpalatals evolved from dorsal consonants. However, since ȵ has also been unfortunately used by some for Meixian Hakka, the distinction of usage has become vague. ȶ, on the other hand, has retained its accurate usage representing phonemes in certain spoken Chinese in Hengyang and has never been applied on Hakka or on certain Mandarin in or near Shandong.

== Notes ==
| Place → | Labial | | | | | Coronal | | | | | | | | | | Dorsal | | | | | Laryngeal | | | |
| Manner ↓ | Bilabial | | Labiodental | | Linguolabial | | Dental | | Alveolar | | Postalveolar | | Retroflex | | (Alveolo-)palatal | | Velar | | Uvular | | Pharyngeal/epiglottal | | Glottal | |
|---|---|---|---|---|---|---|---|---|---|---|---|---|---|---|---|---|---|---|---|---|---|---|---|---|
| Nasal | m̥ | m | ɱ̊ | ɱ | | n̼ | n̪̊ | n̪ | n̥ | n | n̠̊ | n̠ | ɳ̊ | ɳ | ɲ̊ | ɲ | ŋ̊ | ŋ | ɴ̥ | ɴ | | | | |
| Plosive | p | b | p̪ | b̪ | t̼ | d̼ | t̪ | d̪ | t | d | | | ʈ | ɖ | c | ɟ | k | ɡ | q | ɢ | ʡ | | ʔ | |
| Sibilant affricate | | | | | | | t̪s̪ | d̪z̪ | ts | dz | t̠ʃ | d̠ʒ | tʂ | dʐ | tɕ | dʑ | | | | | | | | |
| Non-sibilant affricate | pɸ | bβ | p̪f | b̪v | | | t̪θ | d̪ð | tɹ̝̊ | dɹ̝ | t̠ɹ̠̊˔ | d̠ɹ̠˔ | | | cç | ɟʝ | kx | ɡɣ | qχ | ɢʁ | ʡʜ | ʡʢ | ʔh | |
| Sibilant fricative | | | | | | | s̪ | z̪ | s | z | ʃ | ʒ | ʂ | ʐ | ɕ | ʑ | | | | | | | | |
| Non-sibilant fricative | ɸ | β | f | v | θ̼ | ð̼ | θ | ð | θ̠ | ð̠ | ɹ̠̊˔ | ɹ̠˔ | ɻ̊˔ | ɻ˔ | ç | ʝ | x | ɣ | χ | ʁ | ħ | ʕ | h | ɦ |
| Approximant | | β̞ | | ʋ | | | | ð̞ | | ɹ | | ɹ̠ | | ɻ | | j | | ɰ | | | | | | ˷ |
| Tap/flap | | ⱱ̟ | | ⱱ | | | | | ɾ̥ | ɾ | | | ɽ̊ | ɽ | | | | | | ɢ̆ | | ʡ̆ | | |
| Trill | ʙ̥ | ʙ | | | | | | | r̥ | r | | r̠ | ɽ̊r̥ | ɽr | | | | | ʀ̥ | ʀ | ʜ | ʢ | | |
| Lateral affricate | | | | | | | | | tɬ | dɮ | | | tꞎ | d𝼅 | c𝼆 | ɟʎ̝ | k𝼄 | ɡʟ̝ | | | | | | |
| Lateral fricative | | | | | | | ɬ̪ | | ɬ | ɮ | | | ꞎ | 𝼅 | 𝼆 | ʎ̝ | 𝼄 | ʟ̝ | | | | | | |
| Lateral approximant | | | | | | | | l̪ | l̥ | l | | l̠ | ɭ̊ | ɭ | ʎ̥ | ʎ | ʟ̥ | ʟ | | ʟ̠ | | | | |
| Lateral tap/flap | | | | | | | | | ɺ̥ | ɺ | | | 𝼈̊ | 𝼈 | | ʎ̆ | | ʟ̆ | | | | | | |

| | | BL | LD | D | A | PA | RF | P | V | U |
|---|---|---|---|---|---|---|---|---|---|---|
| Implosive | Voiced | ɓ | | | ɗ | | ᶑ | ʄ | ɠ | ʛ |
| Implosive | Voiceless | ɓ̥ | | | ɗ̥ | | ᶑ̊ | ʄ̊ | ɠ̊ | ʛ̥ |
| Ejective | Stop | pʼ | | | tʼ | | ʈʼ | cʼ | kʼ | qʼ |
| Ejective | Affricate | | p̪fʼ | t̪θʼ | tsʼ | t̠ʃʼ | tʂʼ | tɕʼ | kxʼ | qχʼ |
| Ejective | Fricative | ɸʼ | fʼ | θʼ | sʼ | ʃʼ | ʂʼ | ɕʼ | xʼ | χʼ |
| Ejective | Lateral affricate | | | | tɬʼ | | | c𝼆ʼ | k𝼄ʼ | q𝼄ʼ |
| Ejective | Lateral fricative | | | | ɬʼ | | | | | |
| Click (top: velar; bottom: uvular) | Tenuis | kʘ qʘ | | kǀ qǀ | kǃ qǃ | | k𝼊 q𝼊 | kǂ qǂ | | |
| Click (top: velar; bottom: uvular) | Voiced | ɡʘ ɢʘ | | ɡǀ ɢǀ | ɡǃ ɢǃ | | ɡ𝼊 ɢ𝼊 | ɡǂ ɢǂ | | |
| Click (top: velar; bottom: uvular) | Nasal | ŋʘ ɴʘ | | ŋǀ ɴǀ | ŋǃ ɴǃ | | ŋ𝼊 ɴ𝼊 | ŋǂ ɴǂ | ʞ | |
| Click (top: velar; bottom: uvular) | Tenuis lateral | | | | kǁ qǁ | | | | | |
| Click (top: velar; bottom: uvular) | Voiced lateral | | | | ɡǁ ɢǁ | | | | | |
| Click (top: velar; bottom: uvular) | Nasal lateral | | | | ŋǁ ɴǁ | | | | | |
