= San Miguel de Velasco =

San Miguel de Velasco Samiñere (Chiquitano)
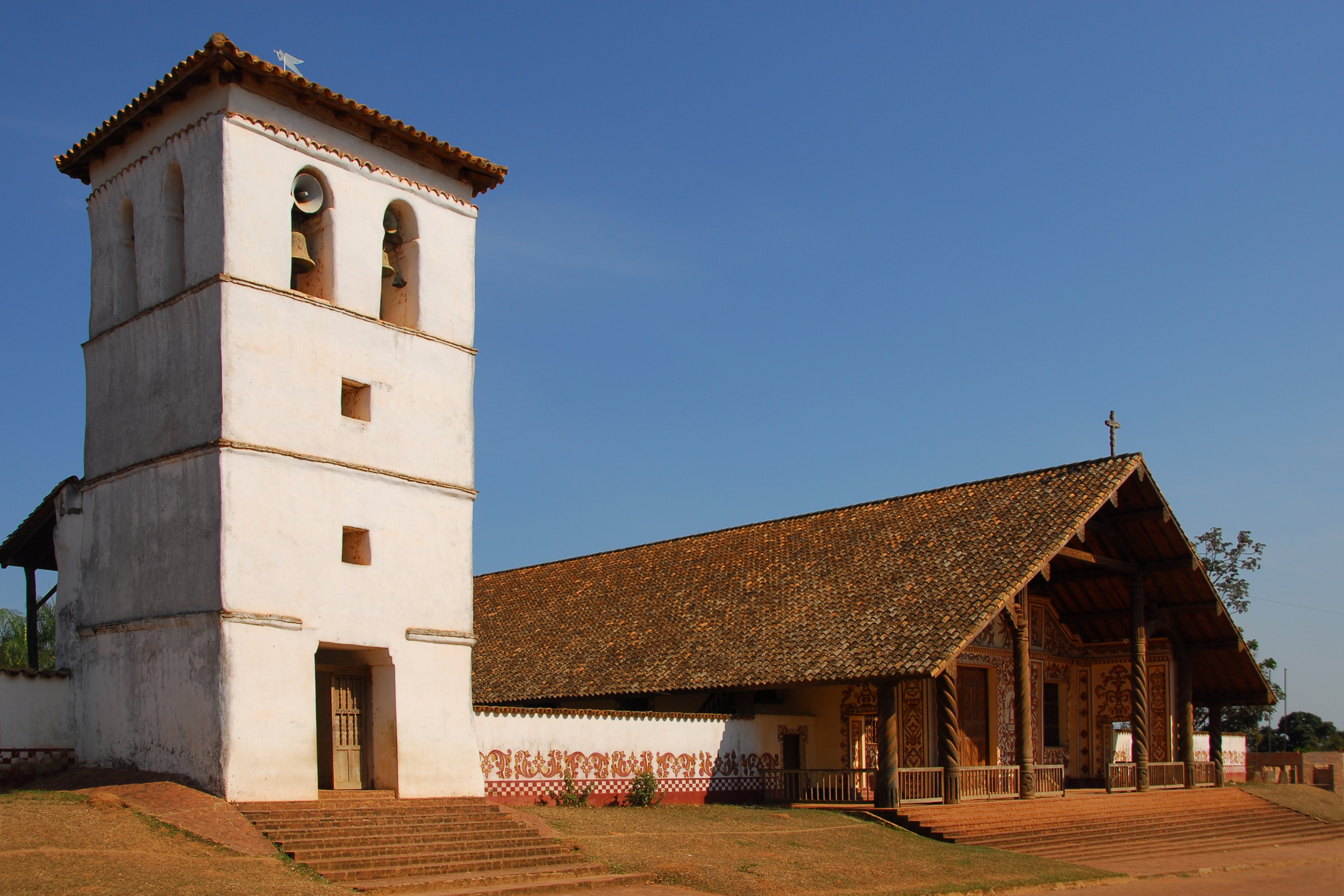
- Mission church of San Miguel de Velasco

- Location in Bolivia
- Coordinates: 16°41′54.96″S 60°58′5.16″W
- Country: Bolivia
- Department: Santa Cruz Department
- Province: José Miguel de Velasco Province
- Municipality: San Miguel Municipality
- Canton: San Miguel Canton

Population (2001)
  - Total: 4,484
- Time zone: UTC-4 (BOT)

San Miguel de Velasco (Spanish: [ˈsam miˈɣel de βeˈlasko], locally [ˈsaŋ miˈɰel de β̞eˈlahko]), or simply San Miguel (Migueleño Chiquitano: Samiñere, pronounced [samĩˈj̃ɛːɾɛ̥]), is a town in the Santa Cruz Department, Bolivia. It is the capital of San Miguel Municipality, the second municipal section of José Miguel de Velasco Province. It is known as part of the Jesuit Missions of the Chiquitos, which was declared a World Heritage Site in 1990, as a former Jesuit Reduction. The wood and adobe church has an elaborate interior.

At the time of census 2001 it had a population of 4,484.

It is served by San Miguel South Airport.

== History ==
In 1721, the mission of San Miguel was founded by the Jesuit missionary Felipe Suárez after San Rafael had grown too large.

== Languages ==
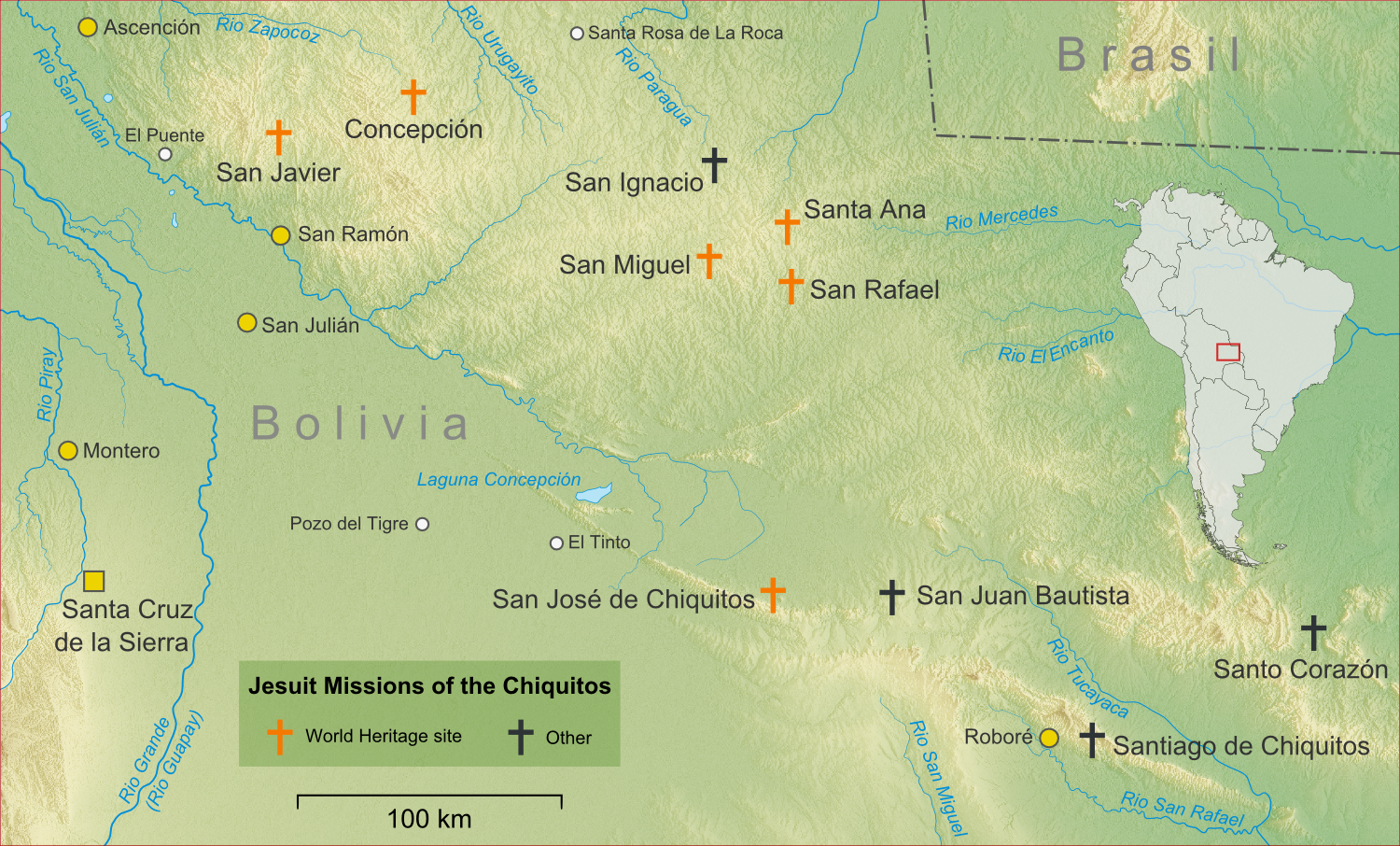
Map showing the present location of the Jesuit Missions of the Chiquitos in Bolivia

San Miguel de Velasco is home to the speakers of Migueleño Chiquitano, a critically endangered variety of the Chiquitano language which is now remembered only by several dozen elderly people. Camba Spanish is the most commonly used everyday language.

== Religious traditions ==
In San Miguel de Velasco, Catholic homilies are traditionally recited in an early form of Migueleño Chiquitano on certain religious occasions. This practice can be traced back to the Jesuit reductions of the 18th century, and the texts of the homilies have been transmitted (both orally and in the written form) across generations. The homilies have been extensively studied by Severin Parzinger, who has published a compilation thereof.

== See also ==
- List of Jesuit sites
- List of the Jesuit Missions of Chiquitos
