= Bolivian Spanish =

Variety of Spanish language

- Español boliviano
- Pronunciation: [espaˈɲol βoliˈβjano]
- Native to: Bolivia
- Native speakers: 4.1 million (2014); 4.5 million in Bolivia (2014)
- Language family: Indo-European: Italic; Latino-Faliscan; Romance; Western; Ibero-Romance; West Iberian; Castilian; Spanish; Bolivian Spanish
- Writing system: Latin (Spanish alphabet)

Official status
- Regulated by: Academia Boliviana de la Lengua

Language codes
- ISO 639-1: es
- ISO 639-2: spa
- ISO 639-3: –
- Glottolog: None
- IETF: es-BO
- Bolivia

Bolivian Spanish (or Castilian) is the variety of Spanish spoken by the majority of the population in Bolivia, either as a mother tongue or as a second language. Within the Spanish of Bolivia there are different regional varieties. In the border areas, Bolivia shares dialectal features with the neighboring countries.

Throughout Bolivia the preservation of phonemic contrast between /ʝ/ and the lateral /ʎ/ (i.e. the absence of yeísmo) is the norm. Aspiration of syllable-final /s/ is frequent in the lowlands, while in the highlands the sibilant /s/ tends to be preserved, realized either as a laminal or, frequently, an apical [s]. In highland dialects, the "trill" phoneme (orthographic ⟨rr⟩ or word-initial ⟨r⟩) is often assibilated, realized as a voiced apicoalveolar fricative, or alveolar approximant, which pronunciation is similar to the sound of ⟨r⟩ ([ɹ]) in English. In highland Bolivian Spanish there is "intense reduction" of unstressed vowels in contact with /s/, often resulting in syllables with /s/ as their nucleus, e.g. pues ("well,...") pronounced [ps].

== Dialects ==
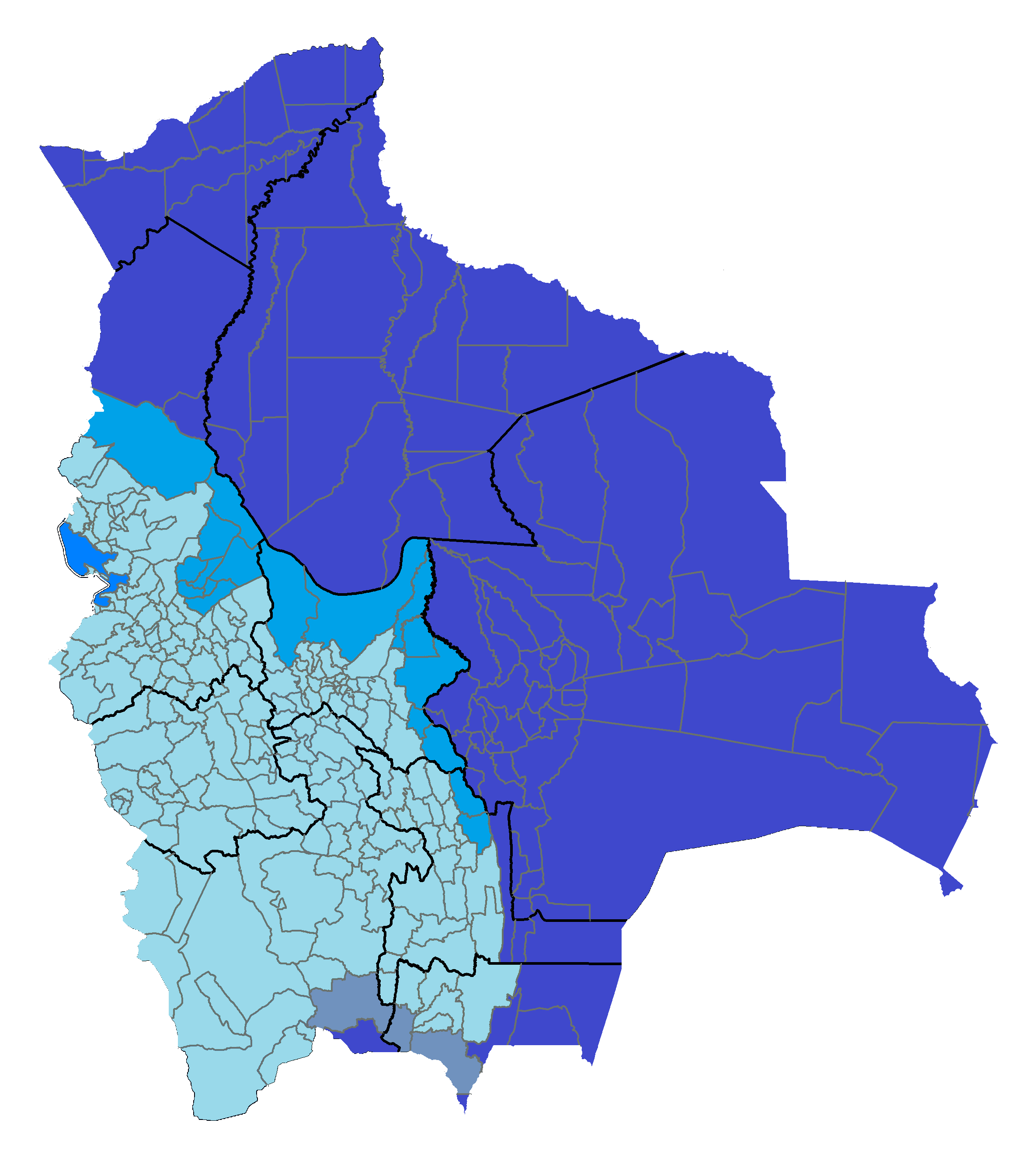
Voseo widespread oral and written like the Rioplatense Voseo widespread oral Voseo pronominal and oral imperative widespread, in writing coexist the vos and tú Voseo pronoun imperative oral written, verbal voseo gaining ground due to the proximity to Argentina

=== Camba Spanish ===
This variety of Spanish is spoken on the Chaco-Beni plain and in the Santa Cruz valleys, a region that includes the departments of Santa Cruz, Beni, and Pando. Spanish is spoken by almost the entire population of these regions, and—like Spanish throughout the Americas—has its basis in Andalusian Spanish and Canarian Spanish, but with influences of native languages such as Chiquitano, Chané and Guarani, as well as Old World languages including Portuguese and Arabic. And although it is fairly uniform across regions and social classes, there are subtle geographical differences.

This dialect is characterized by the debuccalization ("aspiration") of final /s/. For example, the word pues is pronounced [pweh]. For the second-person-singular pronoun and verb forms, the use of "voseo" is dominant. The use of diminutive -ingo and the augmentative -ango is unique to this dialect. For example: chiquitingo ("very small") and grandango ("very large").

Loanwords from Chiquitano or from an extinct variety close to Chiquitano include bi 'genipa', masi 'squirrel', peni 'lizard', peta 'turtle, tortoise', jachi 'chicha leftover', jichi 'worm; jichi spirit', among many others.

=== Chapaco Spanish ===
This dialect is spoken mainly in the valleys and the Gran Chaco of the department of Tarija, but also in the region of Villa Abecia and Camargo (in the department of Chuquisaca), in the province of Sud Chichas (capital Tupiza), and in the Chaco regions of Chuquisaca and Santa Cruz.

The second-person-singular voseo is in full use in Tupiza, in the west of Tarija, and in the rest of the aforementioned areas.

The Chapaco accent has an intonation similar to that of Jujuy, Salta, and Tucumán in Argentina, as the territory where it was originally spoken is now located in the Río de la Plata Province of Tarija. This intonation appears throughout the Bolivian Chaco, Tupiza (Sud Chichas) and the Chuquisaca valleys of Camargo, Villa Abecia, Azurduy, Alcalá, etc.

=== Valluno Spanish ===
This variety is spoken in the departments of Cochabamba and Chuquisaca. It is somewhat similar to Andean Spanish but differs in intonation and the use of idiomatic expressions, due to the mixture of Spanish and Quechua spoken in the valleys of Bolivia.

=== Tuteo and voseo ===
Because many institutions and companies use "tú" and the "tuteante" verb forms for the familiar second-person singular, it is common to encounter the erroneous statement that "tuteo" rather than "voseo" is the usual form in the speech of Bolivia.

=== Similarities ===
This chart shows the similarities between the dialects of Spanish spoken in Bolivia and those spoken in its neighboring Spanish-speaking countries Argentina, Chile, Peru, and Paraguay, as well as Portuguese spoken in neighboring Brazil.

	Bolivia	Argentina	Chile	Peru	Paraguay	Brazil
apricot	damasco	damasco	damasco	albaricoque	damasco	damasco
avocado	palta	palta	palta	palta	aguacate	abacate
banana	plátano	banana	plátano	plátano	banana	banana
beans	frejoles	porotos	porotos	frejoles	porotos	fagiolo
bell pepper	pimiento	morrón	pimiento	pimiento	locote	pimentão
bleach	lavandina	lavandina	cloro	lejía	lavandina	água sanitária
bra	sostén	corpiño	sostén	sostén	corpiño	sutiã
butter	mantequilla	manteca	mantequilla	mantequilla	manteca	manteiga
car	auto	auto	auto	auto	auto	carro
clothes hanger	percha	percha	colgador	colgador	percha	cabide
clothespin	pinza	broche	pinza	gancho	pinza	prendedor
computer	computadora	computadora	computador	computadora	computadora	computador
corn on the cob	choclo	choclo	choclo	choclo	choclo	espiga de milho
gasoline	gasolina	nafta	bencina	gasolina	nafta	gasolina
grapefruit	pomelo	pomelo	pomelo	toronja	pomelo	toranja
green bean	vainita	chaucha	poroto verde	vainita	chaucha	vagem
kitchen stove	cocina	cocina	cocina	cocina	cocina	fogão
panties	calzón	bombacha	calzón	calzón	bombacha	calcinha
pea	arveja	arveja	arveja	arveja	arveja	ervilha
peach	durazno	durazno	durazno	durazno	durazno	pêssego
peanut	maní	maní	maní	maní	maní	amendoim
popcorn	pipocas	pochoclo	cabritas	pop corn	pororó	pipoca
skirt	falda	pollera	falda	falda	pollera	saia
sneakers	tenis	zapatillas	zapatillas	zapatillas	championes	tênis
soft drink	gaseosa	gaseosa	bebida	gaseosa	gaseosa	refrigerante
soy	soya	soja	soya	soya	soja	soja
straw (Note: Refers to the instrument used for drinking.)	bombilla	pajita	bombilla	sorbete	pajita	canudo
strawberry	frutilla	frutilla	frutilla	fresa	frutilla	morango
sweet potato	camote	batata	camote	camote	batata	batata doce
swimming pool	piscina	pileta	piscina	piscina	pileta	piscina
t-shirt	polera	remera	polera	polo	remera	camiseta
washing machine	lavadora	lavarropas	lavadora	lavadora	lavarropas	lavadora
