= San Simon River =

San Simon River may refer to:

- San Simon River (Arizona)
- San Simón River in Bolivia
