= List of the Jesuit Missions of Chiquitos =

The following table summarizes the history of foundings and relocations of the Jesuit Missions of Chiquitos.

Settlement (Note: Missions that are recognized by UNESCO as World Heritage Sites are in bold.)	Founded, Relocated (reason)	Founders	Indians	Languages	Comments	Province	Coordinates	Image
San José de Chiquitos	1698	Felipe Suárez, Fr. Dionisio Ávila	Penoquis	Chiquitano (Penoqui)		Chiquitos Province	17°51′0″S 60°45′0″W	
San Rafael de Velasco	1695, 1701 (epidemic), 1705 (epidemic), 1719 (fire), 1750	Juan Bautista Zea, Francisco Hervás		Chiquitano		José Miguel de Velasco Province	16°47′13″S 60°40′26″W	
San Javier	1691, 1696 (incursion of Paulistas; relocated to the San Miguel River), 1698 (Paulistas; relocated closer to Santa Cruz), 1708 (Spanish from Santa Cruz capturing Indians; relocated away from Santa Cruz)	José de Arce, (Antonio de Rivas?)	Piñocas	Chiquitano (Piñoco)		Ñuflo de Chávez Province	16°16′29″S 62°30′26″W	
San Miguel de Velasco	1721	Felipe Suárez, (Francisco Hervás)		Migueleño Chiquitano	Founded because San Rafael was growing too big	José Miguel de Velasco Province	16°41′54.96″S 60°58′5.16″W	
Concepción	1699, 1707, 1708, 1722	Francisco Lucas Caballero, Francisco Hervás	Chiquitanos	Chiquitano (Bésɨro)		Ñuflo de Chávez Province	16°07′55″S 62°01′34″W	
Santa Ana de Velasco	1755	Julian Knogler	Covarecas and Curuminacas	Otuke (Covareca, Curuminaca)		José Miguel de Velasco Province	16°35′1″S 60°41′16″W	
San Ignacio de Velasco	1748	Diego Contreras, Michael Streicher (also known as Areijer)	Ugaraños	Ignaciano Chiquitano	Partially settled by inhabitants of former San Ignacio de Zamucos	José Miguel de Velasco Province	16°22′0″S 60°57′0″W	
San Juan Bautista	1699, 1705 (epidemic)-closed, (Note: The reduction would have needed to be relocated, but the Indians refused so the mission was closed.) reopened in 1713 in a new location	Juan Bautista Zea, Juan Patricio Fernández	Suberecas, Petas, Piñocas	Chiquitano (Piñoco)	Founded because San José had grown too big	Chiquitos Province	17°54′S 60°22′W	
San Ignacio de Zamucos	1716 (attempts of founding), 1723; abandoned in 1745 (fights between Zamucos and Ugarone)	Felipe Suárez, Juan Bautista Zea, Agustín Castañares		Ayoreo		Cordillera Province	19°10′S 60°38′W	
Santo Corazón	1760, 1788	Antonio Gaspar, José Chueca	Otukes	Otuke		Ángel Sandoval Province	17°58′S 58°48′W	
Santiago de Chiquitos	1754, 1764	Gaspar Troncoso, Gaspar Campos		Santiagueño Chiquitano		Chiquitos Province	18°20′24″S 59°35′54″W	

== See also ==
- Chiquitano language#Historical subgroups
- Jesuit Missions of Moxos
