= San Ignacio de Velasco =

- City
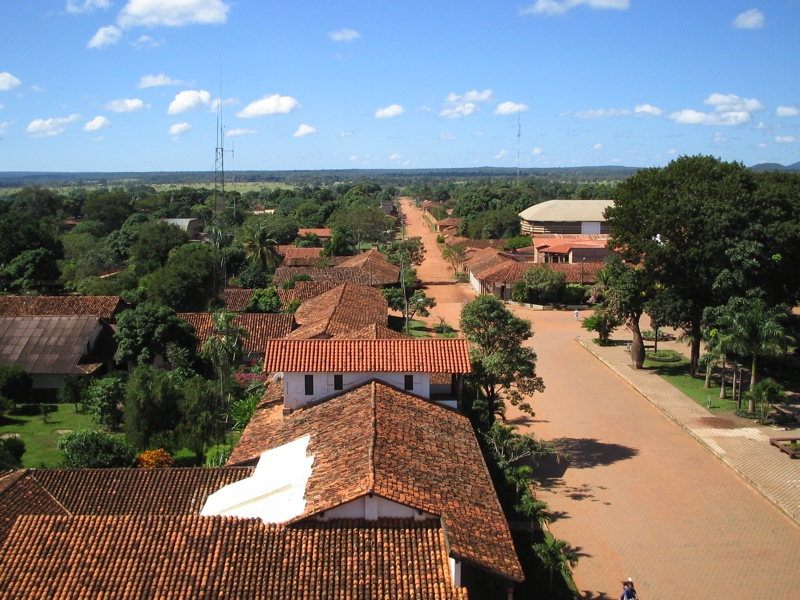
- San Ignacio de Velasco

- Flag

- Location within Bolivia
- Coordinates: 16°22′0″S 60°57′0″W
- Country: Bolivia
- Department: Santa Cruz Department
- Province: José Miguel de Velasco Province
- Municipality: San Ignacio de Velasco Municipality
- Founded: 1749
- Elevation: 410 m (1,350 ft)

Population (2012)
  - Total: 31,196

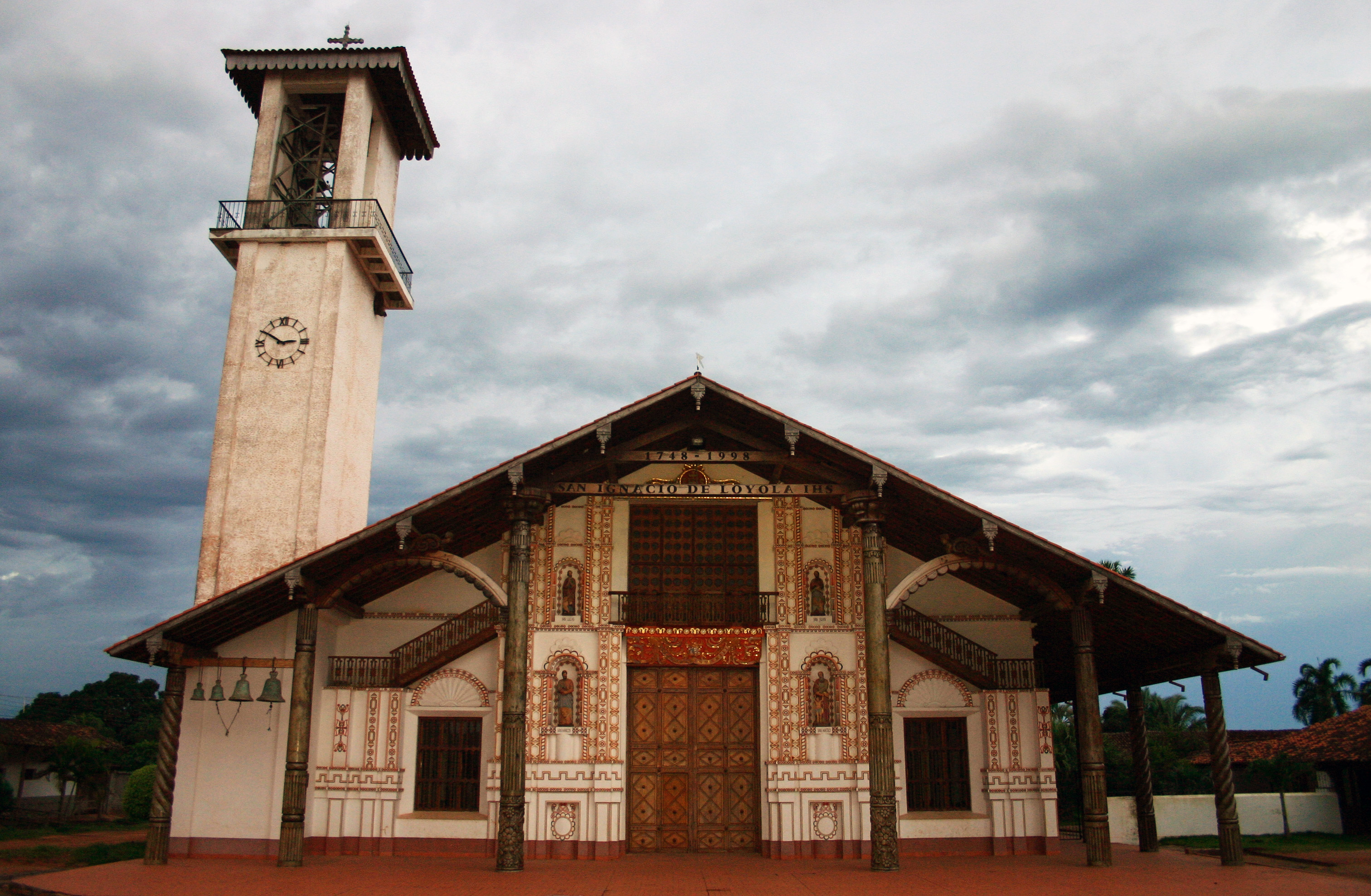
St. Ignatius Cathedral, San Ignacio de Velasco

San Ignacio de Velasco, is the capital of the José Miguel de Velasco Province and the San Ignacio de Velasco Municipality in the Santa Cruz Department of Bolivia.

== History ==
The Jesuit mission of San Ignacio de Velasco was founded in 1748 by the Jesuit missionaries Diego Contreras and Michael Streicher (also known as Areijer). The mission was inhabited by indigenous Ugaraños (Ayoreo). It was partially settled by inhabitants of San Ignacio de Zamucos, another Jesuit mission which had been abandoned in 1745.

== People ==
In 1996, the municipal government published the population as 12,600 persons. It is the largest city in Velasco, and the largest city between metropolitan Santa Cruz and the Brazilian border.

== Languages ==
Camba Spanish is the most commonly used everyday language. The most common indigenous language in San Ignacio and surroundings is the Ignaciano dialect of Chiquitano.

== Geography ==
San Ignacio is located in the south-central region of the province of Velasco. It is connected to Santa Cruz via bus lines utilizing a dirt highway to San Javier in the province of Ñuflo de Chávez. From San Javier to Santa Cruz, the highway is paved. To the east, similar bus lines connect San Ignacio to the Brazilian city of Cáceres and utilized an unpaved road. The city has an airport (Capitán Av. Juan Cochamanidis Airport, airport code SNG) with a dirt airstrip.
San Ignacio is located on the man-made lake, Guapomo, which also serves as the city's supply of fresh water.

== Demographics ==
Nearly all of the people of San Ignacio are indigenous or mestizo, i.e. Camba. Post-World War II German immigrants have a small presence, as well as Mennonites.

== Religion ==
The city is the seat of the Roman Catholic Diocese of San Ignacio de Velasco.

== Climate ==
Climate data for San Ignacio de Velasco, elevation 413 m (1,355 ft)
Month	Jan	Feb	Mar	Apr	May	Jun	Jul	Aug	Sep	Oct	Nov	Dec	Year
Mean daily maximum °C (°F)	30.8 (87.4)	30.5 (86.9)	30.7 (87.3)	30.0 (86.0)	27.8 (82.0)	27.6 (81.7)	28.4 (83.1)	30.8 (87.4)	32.0 (89.6)	32.8 (91.0)	31.8 (89.2)	31.1 (88.0)	30.4 (86.6)
Daily mean °C (°F)	25.9 (78.6)	25.6 (78.1)	25.5 (77.9)	24.3 (75.7)	22.1 (71.8)	21.0 (69.8)	20.8 (69.4)	22.7 (72.9)	24.8 (76.6)	26.3 (79.3)	26.0 (78.8)	26.1 (79.0)	24.3 (75.7)
Mean daily minimum °C (°F)	20.8 (69.4)	20.4 (68.7)	19.9 (67.8)	18.3 (64.9)	16.1 (61.0)	14.2 (57.6)	12.9 (55.2)	14.2 (57.6)	17.4 (63.3)	19.5 (67.1)	19.9 (67.8)	20.6 (69.1)	17.9 (64.1)
Average precipitation mm (inches)	186.7 (7.35)	185.6 (7.31)	140.6 (5.54)	74.7 (2.94)	55.2 (2.17)	27.8 (1.09)	15.6 (0.61)	24.0 (0.94)	51.3 (2.02)	82.9 (3.26)	128.0 (5.04)	163.9 (6.45)	1,136.3 (44.72)
Average precipitation days	12.8	12.0	10.1	6.5	4.7	2.5	1.6	1.9	3.5	6.3	8.5	11.3	81.7
Average relative humidity (%)	78.9	79.9	79.8	78.5	77.8	74.1	66.4	60.3	59.6	65.0	71.8	77.0	72.4
Source: Servicio Nacional de Meteorología e Hidrología de Bolivia

== See also ==
- St. Ignatius Cathedral, San Ignacio de Velasco
- List of Jesuit sites
- List of the Jesuit Missions of Chiquitos
