= Sansimoniano language =

Possibly extinct language of Bolivia

Sansimoniano
- San Simoniano
- Native to: Bolivia
- Region: San Simón River
- Ethnicity: Sansimoniano
- Extinct: after 1935?
- Language family: Macro-Jê ?: Chiquitano; Sansimoniano

Language codes
- ISO 639-3: None (mis)
- Glottolog: sans1265

Sansimoniano (San Simoniano) is a variety of the Chiquitano language, potentially a distinct language, spoken in the Serranía de San Simón in Bolivia along the San Simón River, near the mouth of the Paraguá River. The language is documented solely in a wordlist collected by Emil Heinrich Snethlage around 1935, and it is uncertain whether or not any speakers of it survive. Sansimoniano has historically been wrongly ascribed to the Chapacuran language family.

== Geographical distribution ==
Sansimoniano was spoken along the San Simón River in the Serranía de San Simón, near the mouth of the Paraguá.

== History ==
The Chiquitano-speaking Sansimoniano has been settled in the Serranía de San Simón by the late 19th century. Snethlage visited a roughly 10-year-old boy named Pūriá around 1935, from whom the wordlist was collected from. He had also encountered a woman who had been captured by rubber tappers from a lake connected to the San Martín River. She only remembered a few words in her language, but they corresponded to those given by Pūriá. According to the online language database Glottolog, Sansimoniano has since gone extinct, though it is unknown whether any speakers survive or not.

== Classification ==
The label "Sansimoniano" was applied by Georges de Crequi-Montfort and Paul Rivet (1913) to the Chapacuran-speaking peoples Chapacura, Mure and Rocorona, who resided at the mission of San Simón. Alfred Métraux (1948), following Crequi-Montfort and Rivet, incorrectly ascribed the language of the Sansimoniano to be Chapacuran. However, Snethlage's vocabulary contradicts this; he had noted the similarity between Sansimoniano and Chiquitano in his publication. Čestmír Loukotka and Jacinto Jijón y Caamaño both correctly classified Sansimoniano as a Chiquitano language. John Alden Mason (1950) stated that Sansimoniano had generally been classified as Cariban. Andrey Nikulin (2020) states that it is so divergent that it colud be considered a distinct language from Chiquitano. Glottolog leaves Sansimoniano unclassified.

== Vocabulary ==
The vocabulary collected by Snethlage from Pūriá is presented below:

Sansimoniano vocabulary
gloss	Sansimoniano
tongue	natä́
mouth	wokḗn
tooth	oä̯́n
nose	nja̤ī́n
eye	utī́n
ear	o̯lehī́n
forehead	ho̯kĕpḗïn
head	ka̯bēꞵín
hand	mānī́hi
leg	to̯pä́n
knee	pärĕī́n
foot	pipī́n
neck	pökī́n
sun	sṓu̯
moon	pā́a̯n
woman	pāǘ
tobacco	pāí
monkey	apä́
manioc	tabá̯
