= San Juan de Taperas =

- Location within Bolivia
- Coordinates: 17°54′S 60°22′W
- Country: Bolivia
- Department: Santa Cruz Department
- Province: Chiquitos Province
- Municipality: San José de Chiquitos Municipality
- Elevation: 1,224 ft (373 m)

Population (2012)
  - Total: 832
- Time zone: UTC-4 (BOT)

San Juan de Taperas is a village in San José de Chiquitos Municipality in Chiquitos Province, Santa Cruz Department, Bolivia. The ruins of the mission of San Juan Bautista, one of the Jesuit Missions of the Chiquitos, lie near the village. Since only the ruins of a stone tower survive near the present village of San Juan de Taperas, San Juan Bautista is not one of the six Jesuit Missions of Chiquitos recognized as UNESCO World Heritage Sites.

San Juan de Taperas has a population of 832 as of the 2012 census.

== History ==
The Jesuit mission of San Juan Bautista was initially founded in 1699 by the Jesuit missionaries Juan Bautista Zea and Juan Patricio Fernández after the mission of San José had grown too big. San Juan Bautista mission was inhabited by the indigenous Subereca, Peta, and Piñoca tribes. The mission was closed in 1705 due to an epidemic. The reduction would have needed to be relocated, but the Indians refused; hence the mission was closed. In 1713, the mission reopened in a new location.

== Languages ==
The Tao (Yúnkarirsh) dialect of Chiquitano was spoken in San Juan.

Today, Camba Spanish, which has many words from Chiquitano, is spoken in San Juan de Taperas.

== See also ==
- List of Jesuit sites
- List of the Jesuit Missions of Chiquitos
