= San Ignacio de Zamucos =

- Location within Bolivia
- Coordinates: 19°10′S 60°38′W
- Country: Bolivia
- Department: Santa Cruz Department
- Province: Cordillera Province
- Time zone: UTC-4 (BOT)

San Ignacio de Zamucos or San Ignacio was a Jesuit mission in Santa Cruz Department, Bolivia that was founded in 1724 and abandoned in 1745. The inhabitants of the mission were the Zamucoan-speaking Ayoreo.

== Location ==
The ruins of San Ignacio de Zamucos are located in the southeastern end of the Kaa-Iya del Gran Chaco National Park, near San Ignacio in Cordillera Province, Santa Cruz Department. It is located a few kilometers from the Bolivia-Paraguay border and Cerro San Miguel (or "Cerro de Irala").

== History ==
In 1716, an initial attempt was made at establishing a mission, but the mission was not actually established until 1724.

In 1724, San Ignacio de Zamucos was founded in indigenous Ayoreo ("zamucos ugaraños") territory by the Jesuit missionary Agustín Castañares and the friar Ignacio Chomé, as well as Felipe Suárez and Juan Bautista Zea. However, when Castañares died and the mission was attacked, it was abandoned in 1745. Most of the mission's inhabitants then went on to form part of the population of San Ignacio de Velasco.

== See also ==
- List of Jesuit sites
- List of the Jesuit Missions of Chiquitos
