= San Rafael de Velasco =

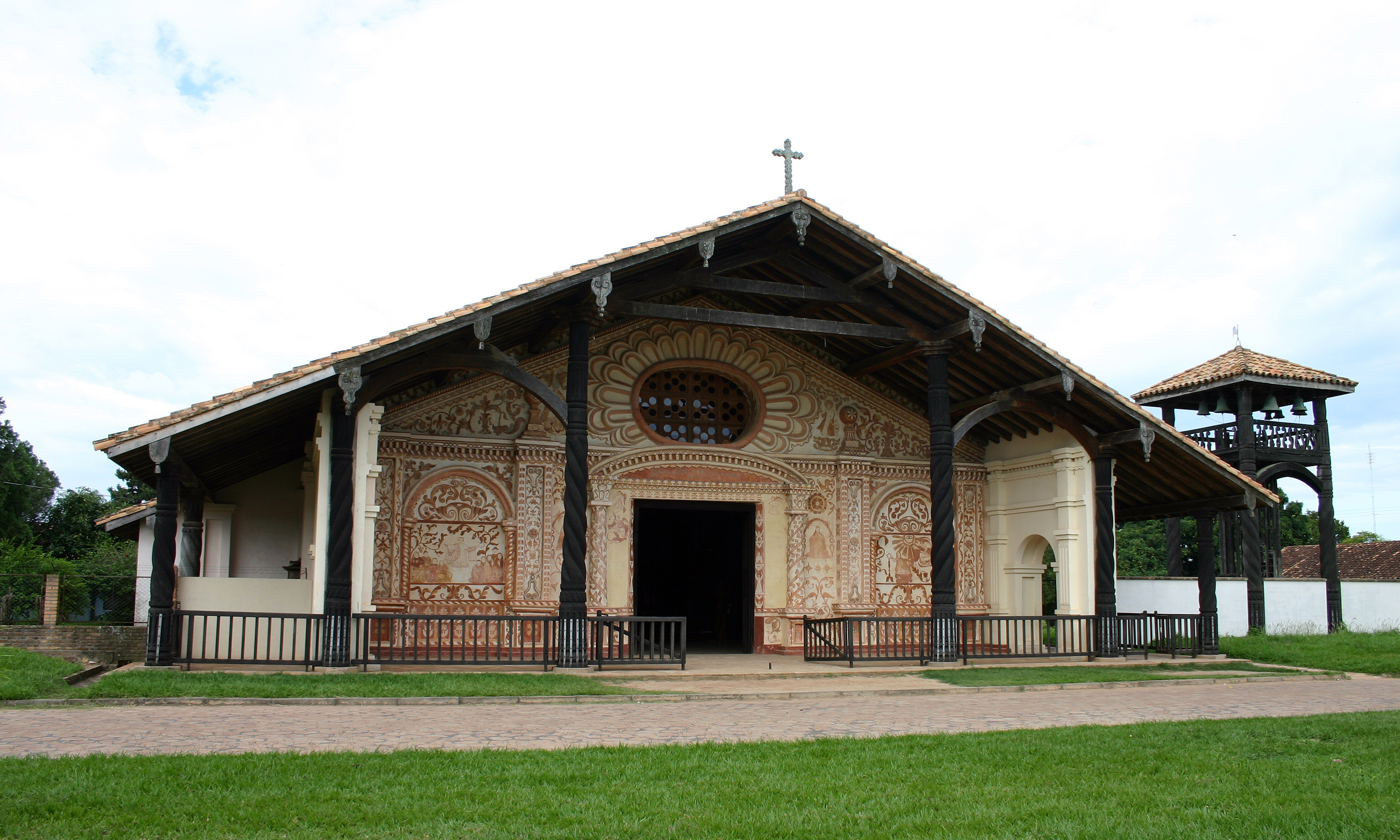
- Mission church in San Rafael de Velasco, Jesuit Missions of Bolivia

- Location within Bolivia
- Coordinates: 16.7869°S 60.6738°W
- Country: Bolivia
- Department: Santa Cruz Department
- Province: José Miguel de Velasco Province
- Municipality: San Rafael Municipality
- Canton: San Rafael Canton

Population (2001)
  - Total: 2,057
- Time zone: UTC-4 (BOT)

San Rafael de Velasco or San Rafael is the seat of the San Rafael Municipality in the José Miguel de Velasco Province, Santa Cruz Department, Bolivia. It is part of the Jesuit Missions of Chiquitos. In 1990 it was declared a World Heritage Site.

== History ==
In 1695, the mission of San José was founded by Jesuit missionaries Juan Bautista Zea and Francisco Hervás. The mission was relocated and rebuilt multiple times due to epidemics (in 1701 and again in 1705) and fires (in 1719). In 1750, the mission was rebuilt yet again.

== Languages ==
The Tao (Yúnkarirsh) dialect of Chiquitano was spoken in San Rafael.

Today, Camba Spanish, which has many words from Chiquitano, is spoken in San Rafael.

== See also ==
- List of Jesuit sites
- List of the Jesuit Missions of Chiquitos
