= Bésɨro =

Indigenous language of Bolivia

- Lomeriano
- Bésɨro
- Pronunciation: [ˈbesɨro]
- Native to: Bolivia
- Ethnicity: Chiquitano
- Native speakers: <2,400 (2012)
- Language family: Macro-Jê?: Chiquitano; Bésɨro
- Writing system: Latin script

Official status
- Official language in: Bolivia

Language codes
- ISO 639-3: cax
- Glottolog: chiq1248
- ELP: Chiquitano

Bésɨro (Lomeriano) is a variety of Chiquitano spoken by less than 2,400 Chiquitano people and a Macro-Jê language. It is one of the 37 official languages of Bolivia.

== Phonology ==
The following data is sourced from Krüsi & Krüsi (1978).

=== Consonants ===
	Bilabial	Alveolar	Palatal	Velar	Glottal
Occlusive	p	t	tʃ	k	ʔ
Fricative	β	s	ʃ		
Nasal	m	n	ɲ		
Liquid		ɾ	j		

- /β/ is realized as [w] in the environment /uβa/.
- /ʃ/ is realized as [ʃ]
  - word-initially before /i/;
  - word-medially after /i, e/;
  - after all nasal vowels.
  - Elsewhere, it is realized as a retroflex [ʂ].

=== Vowels ===
	Front		Central		Back	
	oral	nasal	oral	nasal	oral	nasal
Close	i	ĩ	ɨ	ɨ̃	u	ũ
Mid	e̞	ẽ̞			o̞	õ̞
Open			a	ã		

- /i, u/ range from close [i, u] to near-close [ɪ, ʊ].
- /e̞, o̞/ range from close-mid [e, o] to open-mid [ɛ, ɔ]. [e, ɔ] are the dominant realizations.

=== Nasal assimilation ===
Bésɨro has regressive assimilation triggered by nasal nuclei / ɨ̃ ĩ ũ õ ã ẽ/ and targeting consonant onsets within a morpheme.

- /suβũ/ → [suˈmũ] 'parrot (sp.)'

=== Phonotactics ===
The language has CV, CVV, and CVC syllables. It does not allow complex onsets or codas. The only codas allowed are nasal consonants.

== Orthography ==
Bésɨro is written using the Latin script. The current official standardized alphabet of Bésɨro is presented below:

Majuscule forms (also called uppercase or capital letters)
A	AA	B	CH	E	EE	I	II	Ɨ	ƗƗ	J	K	M	N	Ñ	O	OO	P	R	S	T	TY	U	UU	X	XH	Y	'
Minuscule forms (also called lowercase or small letters)
a	aa	b	ch	e	ee	i	ii	ɨ	ɨɨ	j	k	m	n	ñ	o	oo	p	r	s	t	ty	u	uu	x	xh	y	'
Name of letters
A	Aa	Be	Che	E	Ee	I	Ii	I	Ii	Jota	Ke	Me	Ne	Ñe	O	Oo	Pe	Re	Se	Te	Tya	U	Uu	Xa	Xha	Ye	Glotal
