= St. Ignatius Cathedral, San Ignacio de Velasco =

St. Ignatius Cathedral
- Catedral de San Ignacio
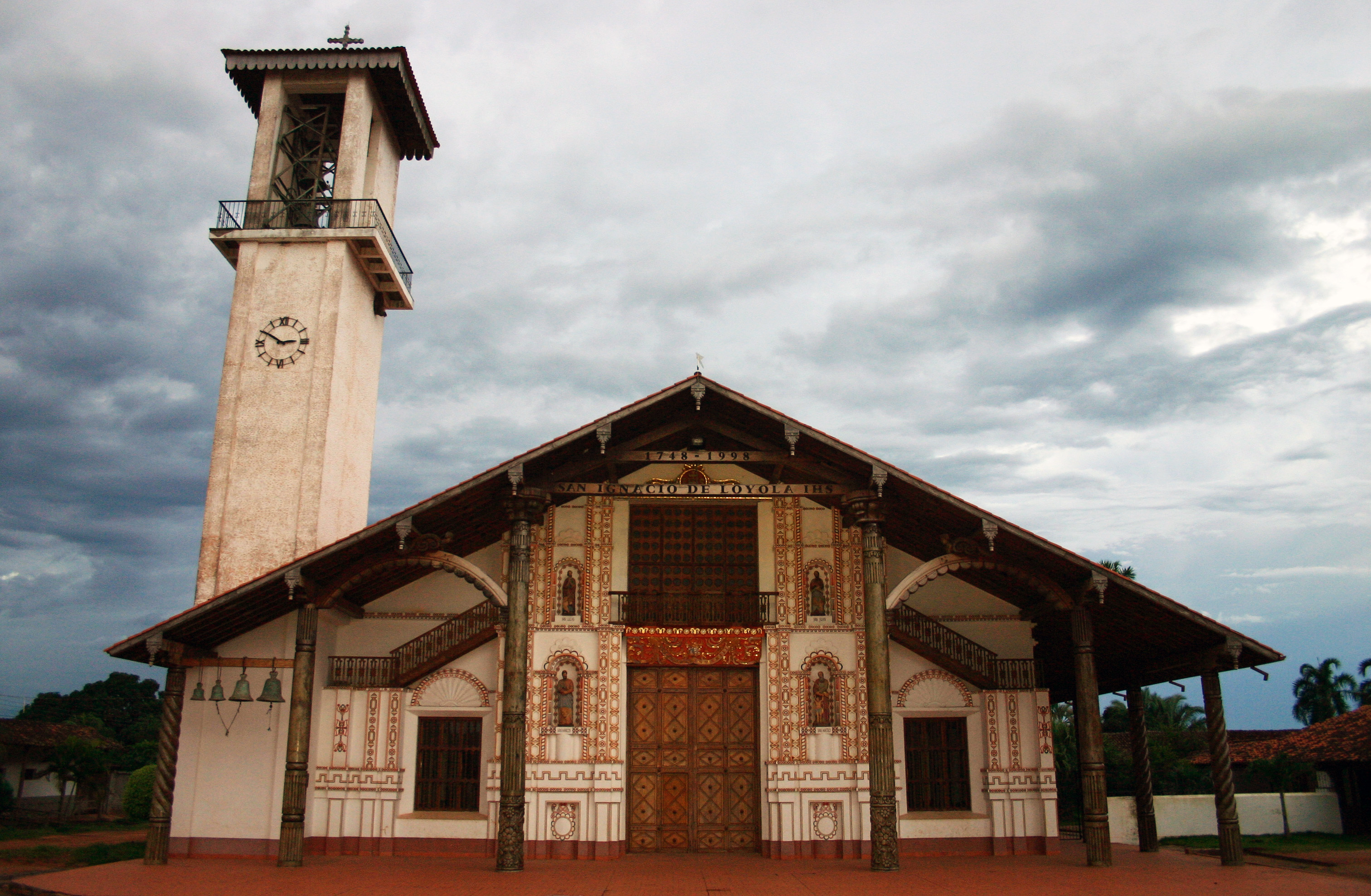
- St. Ignatius Cathedral
- Location: San Ignacio de Velasco
- Country: Bolivia
- Denomination: Roman Catholic Church

Architecture
- Architectural type: church

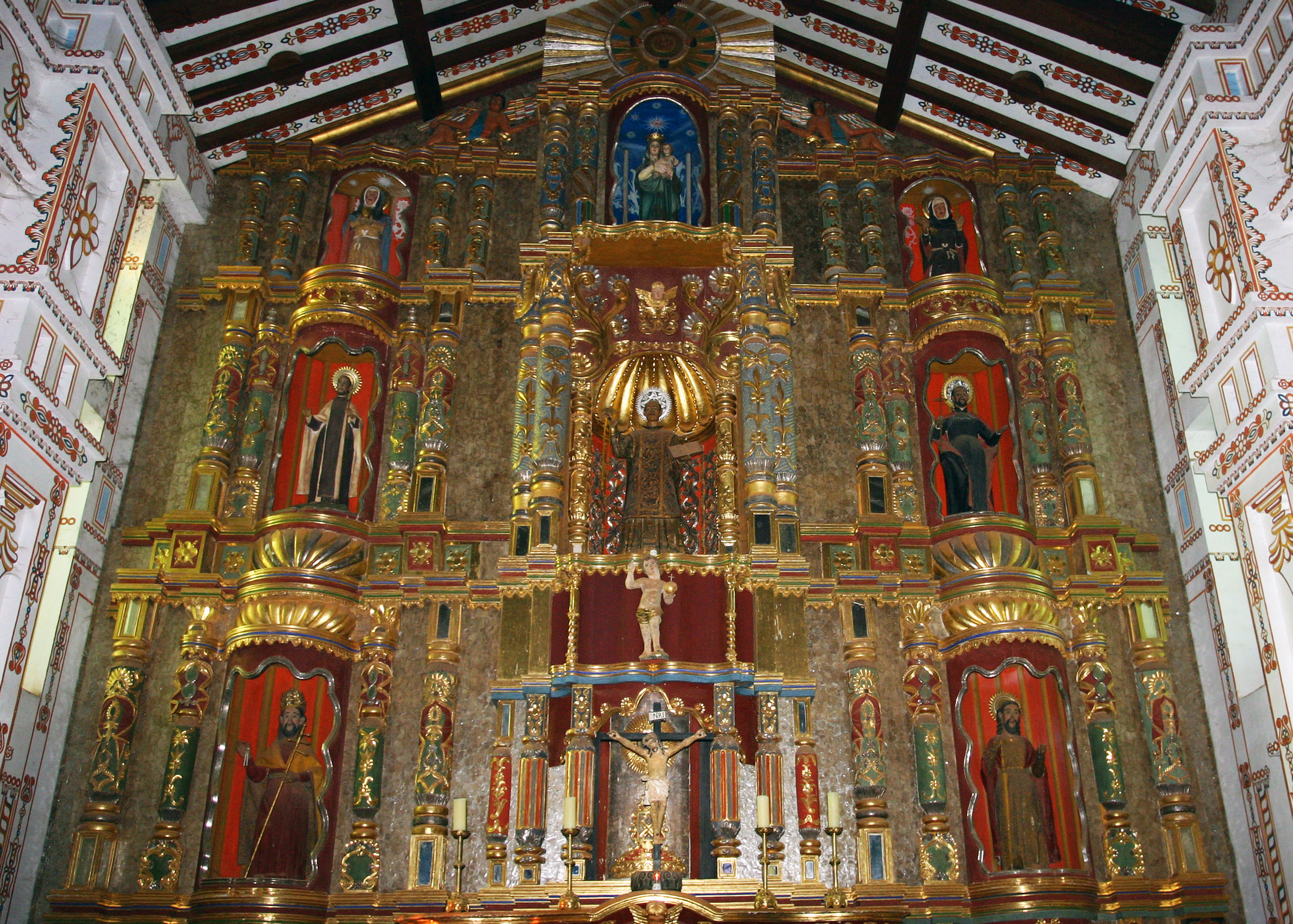
Interior view

The St. Ignatius Cathedral (Spanish: Catedral de San Ignacio), also known as San Ignacio de Velasco Cathedral, is the name of a religious building affiliated with the Catholic Church that is in the city of San Ignacio de Velasco, the capital of the province of Velasco in the department of Santa Cruz, which is in the east of the South American country of Bolivia.

== History ==
The temple that follows the Roman or Latin rite began to be constructed in 1748 with the impulse of the Jesuit missionaries and was finished in 1761. It suffered by a fire in 1948 but was rebuilt between 1998 and 2001.

== Administration ==
It functions as the headquarters or main church of the Diocese of San Ignacio de Velasco (Dioecesis Sancti Ignatii Velascani) which was created as apostolic vicariate by Pope Pius XI in 1930 and was elevated to its current status in 1994 by the bull "Solet catholica" Of Pope John Paul II.

It is under the pastoral responsibility of Bishop Robert Herman Flock Bever.

== See also ==
- Roman Catholicism in Bolivia
- St. Ignatius
