= Capitán Av. Juan Cochamanidis Airport =

Airport in Bolivia

- IATA: SNG; ICAO: SLSI

Summary
- Airport type: Public
- Serves: San Ignacio de Velasco, Bolivia
- Elevation AMSL: 1,355 ft / 413 m
- Coordinates: 16°23′00″S 60°57′46″W

Map
- Location of Capitán Av. Juan Cochamanidis Airport in Bolivia

Runways
| Direction | Length | | Surface |
| Direction | m | ft | Surface |
|---|---|---|---|
| 18/36 | 1,240 | 4,068 | Grass |
- Source: Landings.com Google Maps GCM

Capitán Av. Juan Cochamanidis Airport (Spanish: Aeropuerto Capitán Av. Juan Cochamanidis, (IATA: SNG, ICAO: SLSI)) is an airport serving San Ignacio de Velasco in the Santa Cruz Department of Bolivia. The runway is within the town.

The San Ignacio De Velasco non-directional beacon (Ident: SNG) is located on the field.

== See also ==
- Transport in Bolivia
- List of airports in Bolivia
