= Santo Corazón =

- Location within Bolivia
- Coordinates: 17°58′26″S 58°48′24″W
- Country: Bolivia
- Department: Santa Cruz Department
- Province: Ángel Sandoval Province
- Municipality: San Matías Municipality
- Elevation: 758 ft (231 m)

Population (2012)
  - Total: 774
- Time zone: UTC-4 (BOT)

Santo Corazón is a village in San Matías Municipality in Ángel Sandoval Province, Santa Cruz Department, eastern Bolivia. The mission of Santo Corazón is one of the Jesuit Missions of the Chiquitos.

Santo Corazón has a population of 774 as of the 2012 census.

== History ==
In 1760, the Jesuit Mission of Santo Corazón was founded by Jesuit missionaries Antonio Gaspar and José Chueca.

== Languages ==
Today, Camba Spanish is the most commonly used everyday language. In the past, various dialects of Otuke, such as Coraveca (Curave, Ecorabe), were spoken at the mission of San José de Chiquitos.

== See also ==
- List of Jesuit sites
- List of the Jesuit Missions of Chiquitos
