= Colla (demonym) =

Colla is a demonym used in Bolivia to refer to peoples of the western Andean part of country including those of the capital city of La Paz and the countryside around. Culturally, collas are differentiated from the rest of Bolivia by their Andean heritage including a history of Inca rule in the late 15th and early 16th century. The term colla is derivative of Qullasuyu, the province of the Inca Empire encompassing western Bolivia. Many collas also stand out by their use of Quechua in addition to Spanish. The use of the demonym colla is particularly common among eastern Bolivians. Collas are often contrasted with the lowland camba demonym. Negative stereotypes of the colla are a supposed backwardness, timidness, enviousness and collectivist and traditionalist tendencies.

== See also ==
- Aymara people
- Chapaco
- Colla Kingdom
