= San Miguel South Airport =

- IATA: none; ICAO: SLKQ

Summary
- Airport type: Public
- Serves: San Miguel de Velasco
- Location: Bolivia
- Elevation AMSL: 1,824 ft / 556 m
- Coordinates: 16°42′25″S 60°58′19″W

Map
- Location of San Miguel South Airport in Bolivia

Runways
| Direction | Length | | Surface |
| Direction | m | ft | Surface |
|---|---|---|---|
| 18/36 | 830 | 2,723 | Dirt |
- Sources: Landings.com Google Maps GCM

San Miguel South Airport (ICAO: SLKQ) is an airport serving San Miguel de Velasco in the Santa Cruz Department of Bolivia. The runway is on the south edge of the town.

== See also ==
- Transport in Bolivia
- List of airports in Bolivia
