= Migueleño Chiquitano =

Macro-Jê language of Bolivia

- ózura
- Pronunciation: [ˈo̞tsuɾḁ]
- Native to: Bolivia
- Region: San Miguel de Velasco (Santa Cruz)
- Ethnicity: Chiquitano people
- Native speakers: ~30 (2020)
- Language family: Macro-Jê ?: Chiquitano; Migueleño Chiquitano

Language codes
- ISO 639-3: –
- Glottolog: sanm1288

Migueleño Chiquitano (self-denomination: ózura [ˈo̞tsuɾḁ], literally 'our speech') is a variety of the Chiquitano language of the Macro-Jê family, which is remembered by several dozen people of the Chiquitano ethnicity in San Miguel de Velasco (Santa Cruz), Bolivia, as well as in neighboring villages.

Migueleño is closely related to other varieties of the Chiquitano language, such as Bésɨro and Eastern Chiquitano. Its most salient phonological features include the occurrence of the voiceless velar fricative /x/ corresponding to the retroflex /ʂ/ of the other dialects and the merger of the palatalized counterparts of /p/ and /k/ as [c̠]. It is also the only variety of Chiquitano in which distinct first person singular prefixes have been documented for the male and female genderlects.

== Phonology ==
The following data is sourced from Nikulin (2020).

=== Consonants ===
	Bilabial	Dental/ Alveolar	Post- alveolar	Palatal	Velar	Glottal
Plosive	p ⟨p⟩	t ⟨t⟩	t̠ʲ ⟨ty⟩	c̠ ⟨ky⟩	k ⟨k⟩	ʔ ⟨ʼ⟩
Affricate		ts ⟨z⟩	tʃ ⟨ch⟩			
Fricative		s ⟨s⟩	ʂ ⟨x⟩	ɕ ⟨xh⟩	x ⟨j⟩	h ⟨j-⟩
Liquid	β̞ ⟨b⟩	ɾ ⟨r⟩		j ⟨y⟩	ɰ ⟨g⟩	
Nasal	m ⟨m⟩	n ⟨n⟩		ɲ ⟨ñ⟩	ŋ ⟨ng⟩	

- /ʂ/ is more precisely retroflex.

Seven of the above phonemes are marginal:

- /t̠ʲ c̠ ɕ/ are derived from palatalized /t p/k x/;
- /ʂ/ is derived from /ɾ/ before an elided vowel;
- /ɰ ŋ/ result from epenthesis in the environment /ɨ_V/;
- /h/ occurs with low frequency and alternates with zero.

=== Vowels ===
	Front		Central		Back	
	oral	nasal	oral	nasal	oral	nasal
Close	i ⟨i⟩	ĩ ⟨ĩ⟩	ɨ ⟨ɨ⟩	ɨ̃ ⟨ɨ̃⟩	u ⟨u⟩	ũ ⟨ũ⟩
Mid	ɛ ⟨e⟩	ɛ̃ ⟨ẽ⟩			o ⟨o⟩	õ ⟨õ⟩
Open			a ⟨a⟩	ã ⟨ã⟩		

- /ĩ, ɨ̃, ũ/ may also be written as ⟨im, ɨm, um⟩ or ⟨in, ɨn, un⟩.
- /ɛ, ɛ̃/ are open-mid while /o, õ/ are close-mid.
- Vowels may be devoiced at the end of a prosodic word or between voiceless segments.

== Genderlects ==
In Migueleño Chiquitano, male speech is distinct from female speech in exhibiting extra morphological complexity. In particular, the male genderlect distinguishes between three grammatical genders (masculine, non-human animate, and feminine/inanimate), whereas the female genderlect has no grammatical gender distinctions at all (all nouns behave like the feminine/inanimate nouns in the male genderlect).

In addition, the first person singular prefixes are distinct in the male genderlect (underlying form |ij-|) and in the female genderlect (underlying form |ix-|).

1 SG prefix
translation	female speech	male speech
I stand	xhatɨɨka’i	yatɨɨka’i
my backbone	xhotopɨ́riyɨ	yotopɨ́riyɨ

Female and male speech further differ in using different suffixes (female -ki, male -che) when deriving content interrogative/relative words.

Interrogative and relative words
translation	female speech	male speech
Who is that behind whom you are going? (Whom do you follow?)	¿Ũka na’a si’iki aɨrotɨ́?	¿Ti’i naki si’iche aɨrotɨ́?
Whose son?	¿aɨtokí?	¿aɨtoché?
Where from?	¿aukikí?	¿aukiché?
Whose?	¿ezakí?	¿ezaché?

There are also differences in the choice of the demonstratives.

== Chiquitano homilies ==
In San Miguel de Velasco, Catholic homilies are traditionally recited in an early form of Migueleño Chiquitano on certain religious occasions. This practice can be traced back to the Jesuit reductions of the 18th century, and the texts of the homilies have been transmitted (both orally and in the written form) across generations. The homilies have been extensively studied by Severin Parzinger, who has published a compilation thereof.
