= San Javier, Ñuflo de Chávez =

San Javier
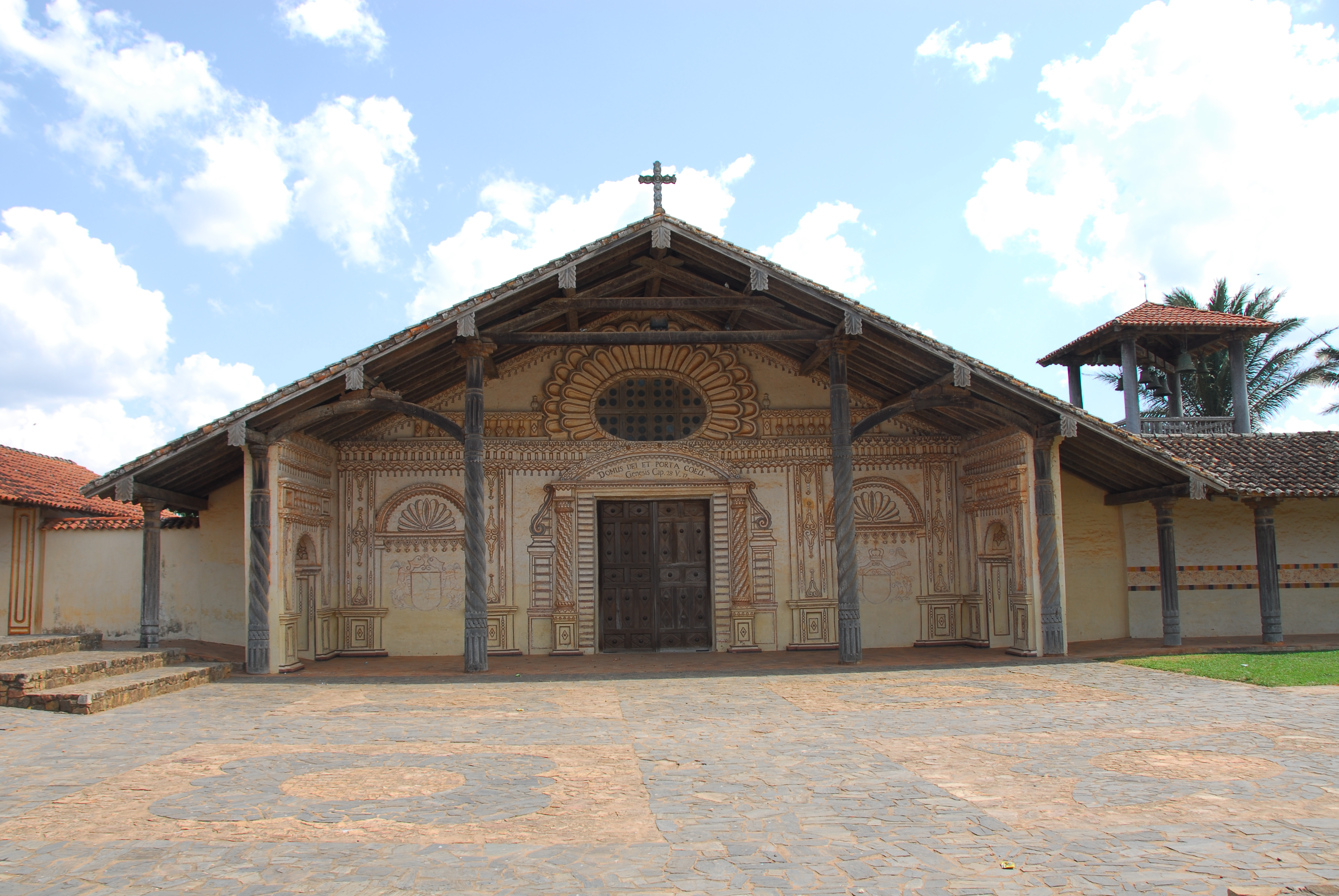
- Mission church of San Javier

- Location within Bolivia
- Coordinates: 16.2748°S 62.5072°W
- Country: Bolivia
- Department: Santa Cruz Department
- Province: Ñuflo de Chávez Province
- Municipality: San Javier Municipality

Population (2001)
  - Total: 6,048
- Time zone: UTC-4 (BOT)

San Javier (San Francisco Xavier de los Piñocas or San Xavier) is the seat of San Javier Municipality in Ñuflo de Chávez Province, Santa Cruz Department, Bolivia. The mission of San Javier is known as part of the Jesuit Missions of the Chiquitos, declared in 1990 a World Heritage Site, as a former Jesuit Reduction.

== History ==
In 1691, the mission of San Francisco Xavier was founded by Jesuit missionary José de Arce. The mission hosted the Piñoca Indians. In 1696, due to the incursion of Paulistas from Brazil, the mission was relocated to the San Miguel River. It was relocated again in 1698, this time closer to Santa Cruz, due to another Paulista incursion. In 1708, Spanish from Santa Cruz captured many Indians, and the mission had to be relocated away from Santa Cruz.

== Languages ==
The Piñoco dialect of Chiquitano, now extinct, was spoken in San Javier.

Today, Camba Spanish, which has many words from Piñoco, is spoken in San Javier.

== Climate ==
Climate data for San Javier, Ñuflo de Chávez, elevation 538 m (1,765 ft)
Month	Jan	Feb	Mar	Apr	May	Jun	Jul	Aug	Sep	Oct	Nov	Dec	Year
Mean daily maximum °C (°F)	29.3 (84.7)	28.9 (84.0)	29.1 (84.4)	28.2 (82.8)	26.2 (79.2)	25.6 (78.1)	26.2 (79.2)	28.5 (83.3)	29.6 (85.3)	30.6 (87.1)	29.9 (85.8)	29.3 (84.7)	28.5 (83.2)
Daily mean °C (°F)	24.9 (76.8)	24.5 (76.1)	24.5 (76.1)	23.5 (74.3)	21.4 (70.5)	20.5 (68.9)	20.2 (68.4)	22.2 (72.0)	23.5 (74.3)	25.1 (77.2)	25.0 (77.0)	24.9 (76.8)	23.3 (74.0)
Mean daily minimum °C (°F)	20.6 (69.1)	20.1 (68.2)	19.8 (67.6)	18.7 (65.7)	16.7 (62.1)	15.3 (59.5)	14.3 (57.7)	15.6 (60.1)	17.4 (63.3)	19.6 (67.3)	20.1 (68.2)	20.5 (68.9)	18.2 (64.8)
Average precipitation mm (inches)	193.6 (7.62)	169.2 (6.66)	148.0 (5.83)	91.0 (3.58)	69.7 (2.74)	45.1 (1.78)	26.5 (1.04)	34.7 (1.37)	60.8 (2.39)	90.2 (3.55)	132.4 (5.21)	164.9 (6.49)	1,226.1 (48.26)
Average precipitation days	12.7	11.5	10.4	6.6	5.7	3.6	2.5	2.6	3.8	5.9	8.3	11.0	84.6
Average relative humidity (%)	82.2	82.8	82.2	80.9	80.4	78.4	71.1	65.6	65.2	70.5	76.2	81.5	76.4
Source: Servicio Nacional de Meteorología e Hidrología de Bolivia

== See also ==
- List of Jesuit sites
- List of the Jesuit Missions of Chiquitos
