= San José de Chiquitos =

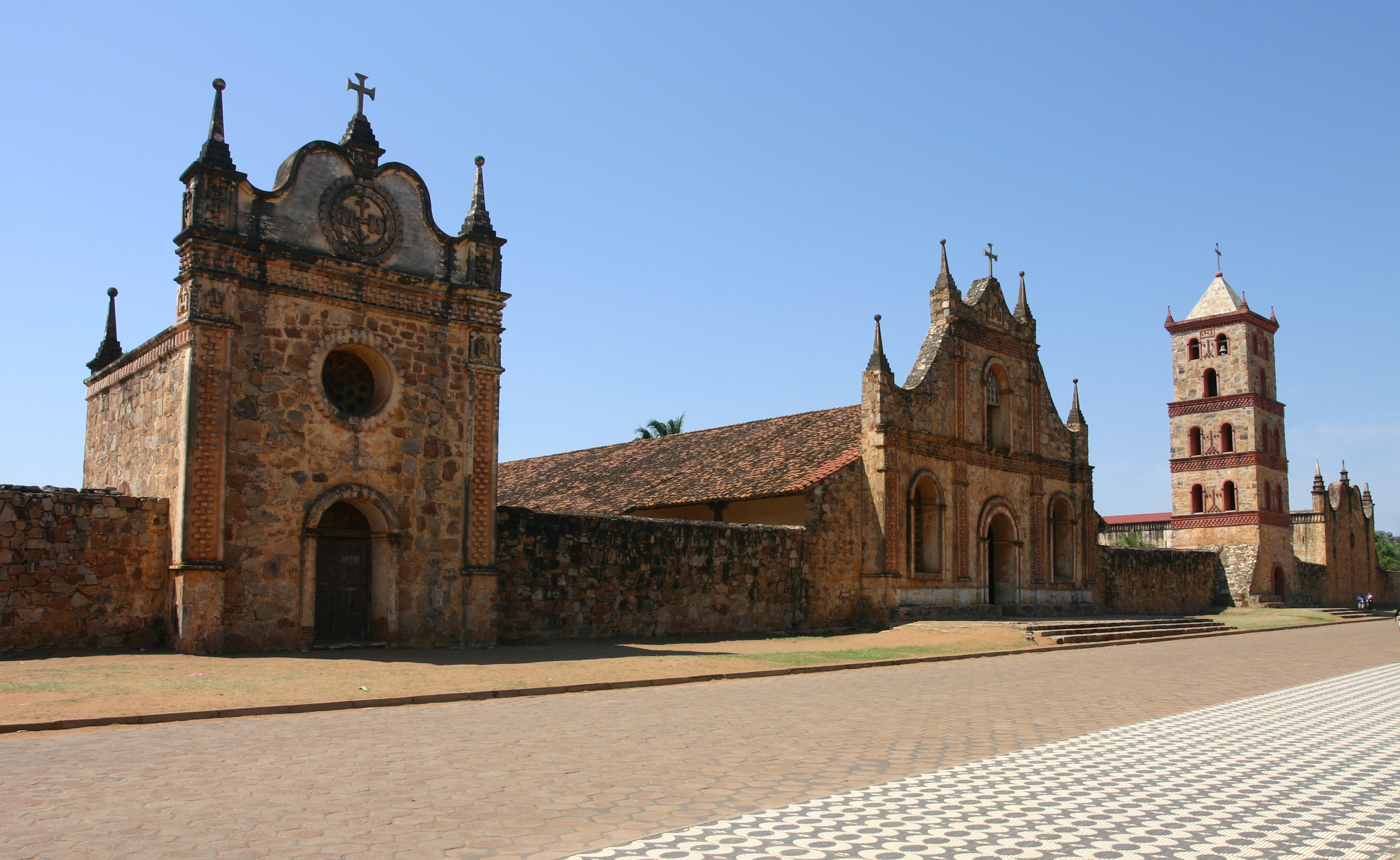
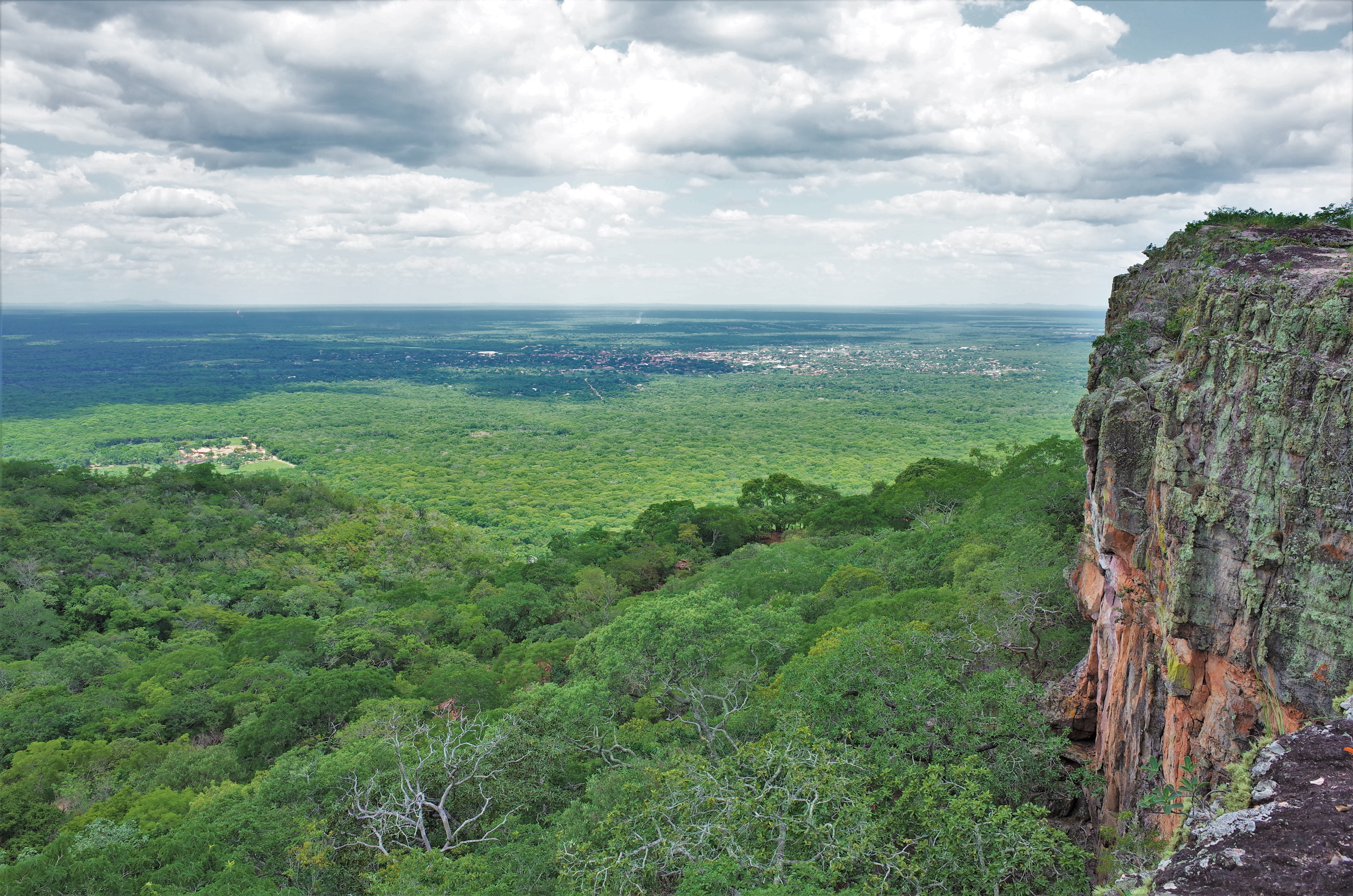

- Flag

- Location in Bolivia
- Coordinates: 17°51′0″S 60°45′0″W
- Country: Bolivia
- Department: Santa Cruz Department
- Province: Chiquitos Province
- Municipality: San José de Chiquitos Municipality
- Canton: San José Canton

Population (2001)
  - Total: 9,211
- Time zone: UTC-4 (BOT)

San José de Chiquitos (Spanish pronunciation: [ˌsan xoˈse de tʃiˈkitos]), or simply San José, is the capital of Chiquitos Province in the Santa Cruz Department, Bolivia. A former Jesuit Reduction, it is part of the Jesuit Missions of the Chiquitos, which was declared a World Heritage Site in 1990.

The ruins of the mission of San Juan Bautista, one of the Jesuit Missions of the Chiquitos, lie near the village of San Juan de Taperas in San José de Chiquitos Municipality.

== History ==
In 1698, the mission of San José was founded by Jesuit missionaries Felipe Suárez and Fr. Dionisio Ávila. The mission hosted the Penoqui Indians.

== Languages ==
Today, Camba Spanish is the most commonly used everyday language. In the past, the Penoqui dialect of Chiquitano was spoken at the mission of San José de Chiquitos.

== Climate ==
Climate data for San José de Chiquitos, elevation 284 m (932 ft)
Month	Jan	Feb	Mar	Apr	May	Jun	Jul	Aug	Sep	Oct	Nov	Dec	Year
Mean daily maximum °C (°F)	32.6 (90.7)	32.1 (89.8)	32.0 (89.6)	31.1 (88.0)	28.8 (83.8)	28.2 (82.8)	29.0 (84.2)	31.4 (88.5)	33.0 (91.4)	33.9 (93.0)	33.2 (91.8)	32.9 (91.2)	31.5 (88.7)
Daily mean °C (°F)	27.1 (80.8)	26.7 (80.1)	26.4 (79.5)	25.1 (77.2)	22.8 (73.0)	21.5 (70.7)	21.3 (70.3)	23.2 (73.8)	25.5 (77.9)	27.1 (80.8)	27.1 (80.8)	27.2 (81.0)	25.1 (77.2)
Mean daily minimum °C (°F)	21.5 (70.7)	21.2 (70.2)	20.8 (69.4)	19.1 (66.4)	16.8 (62.2)	14.9 (58.8)	13.8 (56.8)	15.3 (59.5)	18.0 (64.4)	20.4 (68.7)	21.0 (69.8)	21.5 (70.7)	18.7 (65.6)
Average precipitation mm (inches)	190.4 (7.50)	117.6 (4.63)	173.0 (6.81)	170.2 (6.70)	85.2 (3.35)	94.0 (3.70)	88.0 (3.46)	86.0 (3.39)	82.1 (3.23)	77.0 (3.03)	106 (4.2)	128 (5.0)	1,397.5 (55)
Average precipitation days	10.4	9.8	8.7	4.7	4.6	2.7	1.8	1.7	3.0	5.7	7.2	8.6	68.9
Average relative humidity (%)	72.9	75.1	75.2	73.1	72.8	69.5	60.6	55.5	54.4	60.7	65.5	71.3	67.2
Source: Servicio Nacional de Meteorología e Hidrología de Bolivia

== See also ==
- List of Jesuit sites
- List of the Jesuit Missions of Chiquitos
