= San Matías, Santa Cruz =

Coordinates: 16.3611°S 58.4053°W

San Matías (Santa Cruz)
- Town
- Interactive map of San Matías (Santa Cruz)
- Country: Bolivia
- Department: Santa Cruz Department
- Province: Ángel Sandoval Province
- Municipality: San Matías Municipality
- Canton: San Matías Canton

Population (2001)
  - Total: 5,370
- Time zone: UTC-4 (BOT)

San Matías (Santa Cruz) is a small town in Bolivia.
