= San Rafael Municipality, Santa Cruz =

San Rafael Municipality, Bolivia
- Municipality
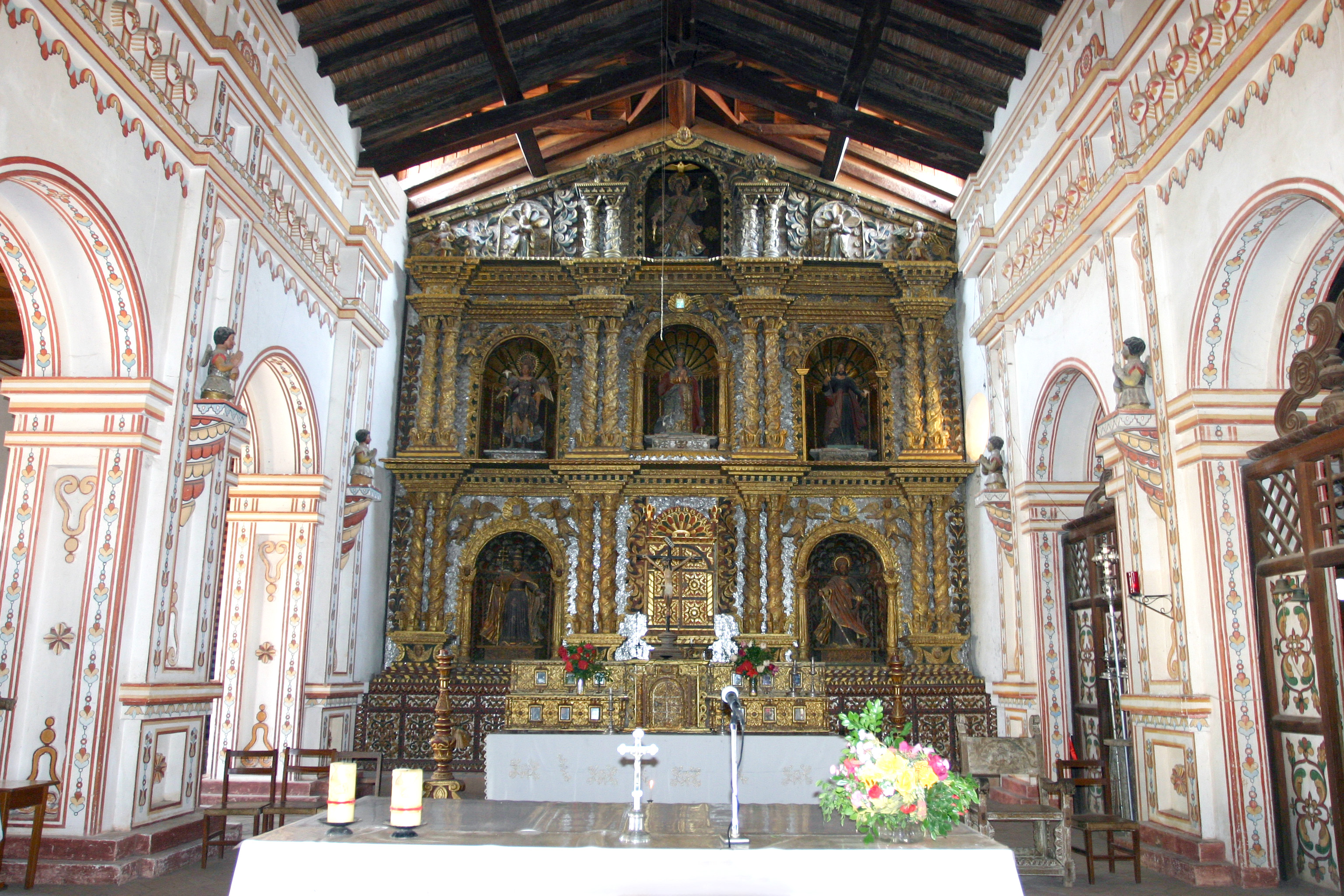
- Mission church in San Rafael de Velasco

- Location of San Rafael within Bolivia
- Coordinates: 16°47′12.84″S 60°40′25.68″W
- Country: Bolivia
- Department: Santa Cruz Department
- Province: José Miguel de Velasco Province
- Seat: San Rafael de Velasco

Government
  - Mayor: Rosauro Flores Silva
  - President: Carmelo Flores Dorado

Area
  - Total: 3,793.20 sq mi (9,824.33 km^{2})

Population (2001)
  - Total: 5,017

San Rafael Municipality is the third municipal section of the José Miguel de Velasco Province in the Santa Cruz Department, Bolivia. San Rafael de Velasco is the seat of the municipality. Its mission church is part of the World Heritage Site Jesuit Missions of Chiquitos.

== Languages ==
The predominant language spoken in the San Rafael Municipality is Spanish.

Language	Inhabitants
Quechua	29
Aymara	22
Guaraní	13
Another native	89
Spanish	4,600
Foreign	63
Only native	11
Native and Spanish	136
Only Spanish	4,469
