= Ángel Sandoval Province =

Province in Bolivia

Provincia Ángel Sandoval
- Province
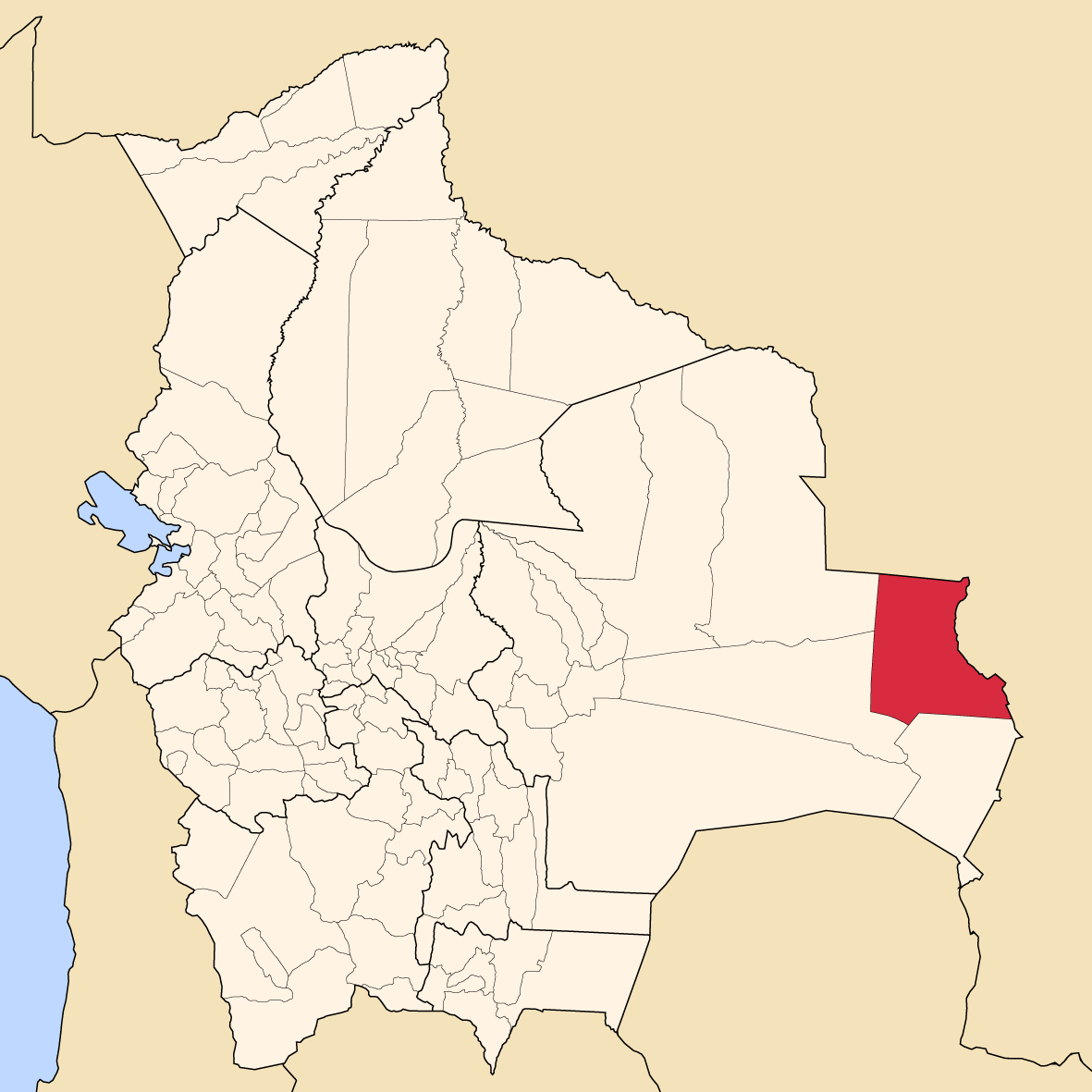
- Interactive map of Provincia Ángel Sandoval
- Country: Bolivia
- Department: Santa Cruz

Area
  - Total: 32,030 km^{2} (12,370 sq mi)

Population (2024)
  - Total: 15,336
  - Density: 0.4788/km^{2} (1.240/sq mi)
- ISO 3166 code: BO.SC.AS

Ángel Sandoval Province is one of the fifteen provinces of the Bolivian Santa Cruz Department and is situated in the department's eastern parts. Its capital is San Matías.

== Location ==
Ángel Sandoval Province is located between 16° 16' and 18° 00' South and between 57° 37' and 59° 30' West. It extends over 100–180 km from West to East, and 210 km from North to South.

The province is situated in the Bolivian lowlands and borders Brazil in the East and North, José Miguel de Velasco Province in the Northwest, Chiquitos Province in the Southwest, and Germán Busch Province in the Southeast.

== Population ==
The population of Ángel Sandoval Province has increased by circa 40% over the recent two decades:

- 1992: 10,695 inhabitants (census)
- 2001: 13,073 inhabitants (census)
- 2005: 14,135 inhabitants (est.)
- 2010: 14,719 inhabitants (est.)

In 1992, 46.1% of the population were younger than 15 years old. 98.4% of the population speak Spanish, 2.1% spoke Quechua, 1.5% Aymara, and 1.2 spoke other indigenous languages. 94.1% of the population are Catholics, 5.3% are Protestants.

The literacy rate of the province increased from 84.4% to 89.3% between 1992 and 2001.

== Division ==
The province comprises only one municipality, San Matías Municipality. It is identical to Ángel Sandoval Province. The province is further subdivided into four cantons (cantones):

- La Gaiba Canton
- Las Petas Canton
- San Matías Canton
- Santo Corazón Canton

== Places of interest ==
- San Matías Integrated Management Natural Area
