= Chiquitano languages =

Language family of Bolivia and Brazil

Chiquitano
- Chiquito
- Geographic distribution: Bolivia, Brazil (Santa Cruz (Bolivia); Mato Grosso (Brazil))
- Ethnicity: c. 100,000 Chiquitanos
- Native speakers: 2,400 (2021)
- Linguistic classification: Macro-Jê?: Chiquitano
- Subdivisions: Tao • Lomeriano (Bésɨro) • Migueleño • Ignaciano–Santiagueño; Sansimoniano; Penoqui †; Piñoco †; Manasí †

Language codes
- Glottolog: chiq1253
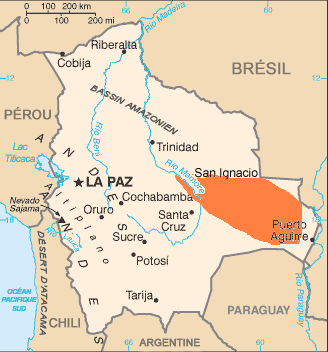

Chiquitano (or Tarapecosi) is a group of linguistic varieties, thought to belong to the Macro-Jê languages, spoken by the Chiquitano people in the central region of Santa Cruz Department of eastern Bolivia and the state of Mato Grosso in Brazil.

== Name ==
Some Chiquitano also prefer to call themselves Monkóka (plural form for 'people'; the singular form for 'person' is Monkóxɨ).

== Classification ==
Chiquitano is sometimes considered to be a language isolate.

Kaufman (1994) suggests a relationship with the Bororoan languages within his Macro-Jê "cluster", a designation he gave to unsubstantiated language family proposals. Adelaar (2008) classifies Chiquitano as a Macro-Jê language, while Andrey Nikulin (2020) suggests that Chiquitano is rather a sister of Macro-Jê. More recently, Nikulin (2023) classified Chiquitano as a branch of Macro-Jê instead of as a sister branch of it.

== Geographical distribution ==
In Brazil, Chiquitano is spoken in the municipalities of Cáceres, Porto Esperidião, Pontes e Lacerda, and Vila Bela da Santíssima Trindade in the state of Mato Grosso.

== Varieties ==
=== Historical ===
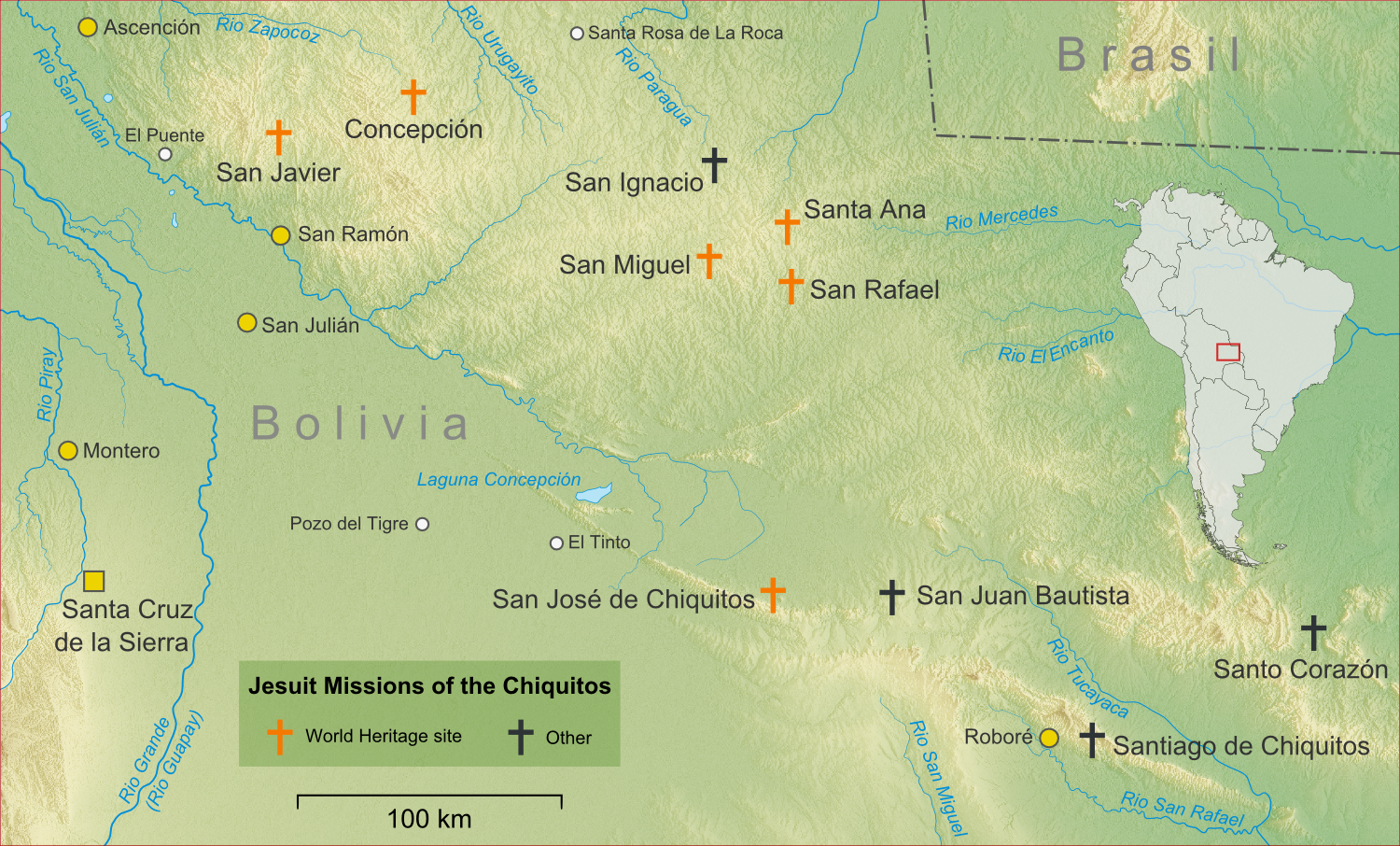
Locations of the Jesuit Missions of Chiquitos with present international borders

Four "dialects" of Chiquitano were spoken at the time of the founding of the Jesuit missions: Tao (or Yúnkarirš), Piñoco, Manasí, and Penoquí. Of these dialects, Piñoco and Tao were claimed to be mutually intelligible and thus dialects of a single language. Nikulin (2019) proposes that Camba Spanish has a Piñoco substratum. Camba Spanish was originally spoken in Santa Cruz Department, Bolivia, but is now also spoken in Beni Department and Pando Department. The only documentation of Manasí comes from a manuscript by Lucas Caballero in 1706. It was quickly replaced by the Tao dialect. Penoquí was initially spoken in San José, but was soon replaced by the Piñoco dialect, and was so divergent that Father Felipe Suarez, who authored a Chiquitano grammar, had to translate the catechism and compile a dictionary of it. The document is held at the Archivo de la Sociedad Geográfica de Santa Cruz de la Sierra. Isabelle Combès (2012) has proposed the Penoqui "dialect" to be identical to Gorgotoqui, further proposing a possible relationship to Otuke, a Bororoan language. Otuke was also spoken in some of the missions. Nikulin (2019) considers this plausible.

=== Modern ===
The Churapa variety of Chiquitano was documented by Erland Nordenskiöld and the engineer Antonio Pauly. The Sansimoniano "dialect", particularly divergent from the others, known from a single wordlist published in 1935, has also been proposed to be a Chapacuran language, though this is erroneous according to the only wordlist of the dialect. The modern dialects of Chiquitano still spoken today, Bésɨro (Lomeriano), Migueleño, Ignaciano, and Santiagueño, the latter two tentatively proposed by Nikulin to form an Eastern subgroup, spoken in San Ignacio de Velasco, Santiago de Chiquitos, and Brazil, are all found in the area occupied by the Tao dialect; Nikulin (2019) thus considers these dialects, the proto-language of which he reconstructs as Proto-Chiquitano, to be descended from Tao.

Chiquitano
  - Tao
    - Bésɨro (also known as Lomeriano Chiquitano), spoken in the Lomerío region and in Concepción, Ñuflo de Chávez Province. Co-official status and has a standard orthography.
    - Migueleño Chiquitano (in San Miguel de Velasco and surroundings), moribund with fewer than 30 speakers
    - Eastern?
      - Ignaciano Chiquitano (in San Ignacio de Velasco and surroundings)
      - Santiagueño Chiquitano (in Santiago de Chiquitos)
  - Sansimoniano (spoken in the far northeast of Beni Department)
  - Piñoco (formerly spoken in the missions of San José de los Boros, San Francisco Xavier de los Piñoca, and San José de Buenavista/Desposorios; see also Jesuit Missions of Chiquitos)

== Vocabulary ==
For a vocabulary list of Chiquitano by Santana (2012), see the Portuguese Wiktionary.

=== Language contact ===
Chiquitano has borrowed extensively from an unidentified Tupí-Guaraní variety; one example is Chiquitano takones [takoˈnɛs] ("sugarcane"), borrowed from a form close to Paraguayan Guaraní takuare'ẽ ("sugarcane"). There are also numerous Spanish borrowings.

Chiquitano (or an extinct variety close to it) has influenced the Camba variety of Spanish. This is evidenced by the numerous lexical borrowings of Chiquitano origin in local Spanish. Examples include bi ("genipa"), masi ("squirrel"), peni ("lizard"), peta ("turtle", "tortoise"), jachi ("chicha leftover"), jichi ("worm"; "jichi spirit"), among many others.
