= Camba =

Historical Bolivian term referring to the indigenous people of eastern Bolivia

Camba is a word historically used in Bolivia to refer to the indigenous population in the eastern tropical region of the country, or to those born in the area of Santa Cruz, Beni, and Pando. Nowadays, the term "Camba" is used predominantly to refer to eastern Bolivian populations of mixed Spanish, Chane, and other indigenous Amazonian descent born in the eastern lowlands in and around Santa Cruz de la Sierra.

Collas, who are the population that lives in Western Bolivia, have always been in conflict with Camba people due to their different customs, behavior and appearance. Therefore, it may be common to hear Camba people use the term "Colla" as a swear word or to insult the Western population as such as it is possible to hear Collas curse on cambas.

Camba may also be used as a colloquial term for "person", as in "Who is that person?" translated to "¿Quien es ese camba?" (ignores the ethnicity of the subject and does not change depending on gender as most Spanish nouns do). Such use is predominant in eastern Bolivia.

== Etymology and context ==
According to a theory presented by Ramón Rocha Monroy, some of the Bantu languages spoken by Angolans who were sold in America as slaves, were recorded in a book published by a Jesuit missionary named Pedro Dias in 1697, called Arte da Lengua de Angola (The art of the Angola language). This publication had recorded the word camba (Friend of the color black), among other words, and its plural form macamba.

During that time, Angola, which was a Portuguese Colony, was responsible for more than a third of the slave trade on the Atlantic directed toward Brazil From there the slaves went to the Spanish colonies, from the Río de la Plata (Plata River) to Eastern Bolivia. Kamba has become part of several Indigenous languages of the region, like Guaraní, as a demonym (nickname) for black persons (different than hũ, which means 'the color black'), as well as to refer to the King Mago Baltasar. In several local Liturgies he was called el Santo Cambá, or the Camba Saint.

Today, the term camba is used as a demonym for the mestizo cruceños, or people with indigenous and European (mainly Creole) ancestry from Santa Cruz, Pando and Beni.

African slaves got all the way to modern day Potosí, Bolivia, however, they were able to settle mostly in the yungas. The term could have begun as a demonym ther. e, and then spread to the rest of eastern Bolivia.

Another hypothesis states that the word camba comes from a town in Galicia, called Cambados. Some dispute this theory considering it to be improbable, insulting or politically incorrect to have a nickname for "cruceños" (persons from Santa Cruz) with an African origin. They support this based on the chronicles written by the Jesuits, which describe many traditions of Spaniards and Creoles in America, but don't make any mention that they would use African vocabulary to describe themselves.

== Symbols ==
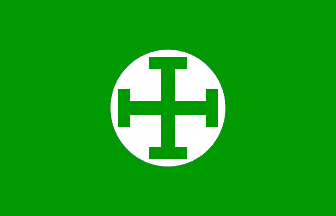
Flag of the Camba Nation

Social or sociocultural symbols are a set of characteristics that represent the culture of a particular region.

Flag of the Patujú

The Flag of the Patujú flower was created to represent the indigenous peoples of the Bolivian lowlands (as a counterpart to the wiphala). Additionally, since the Patujú flower is a symbol representing the geography and cultural diversity of the Bolivian east, it can also be said to represent the Camba people, who identify with it.

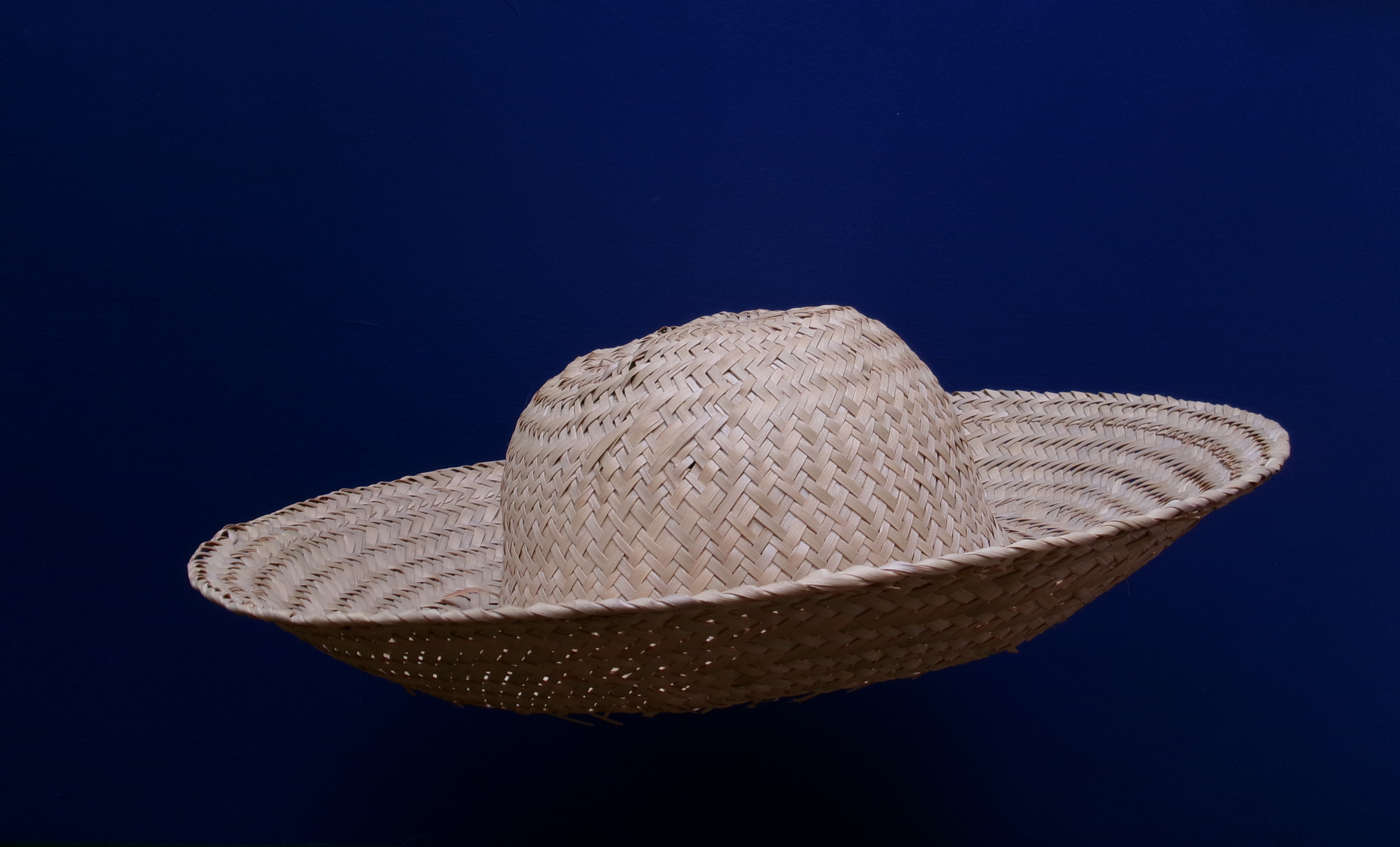
Saó Hat

The Saó Hat (sombrero e' saó) is an essential accessory in the traditional attire of the Camba people, used mainly in folkloric dances. However, in rural areas of the Santa Cruz Department and the Bolivian Amazon, it is still worn as a "hat that protects from the sun."

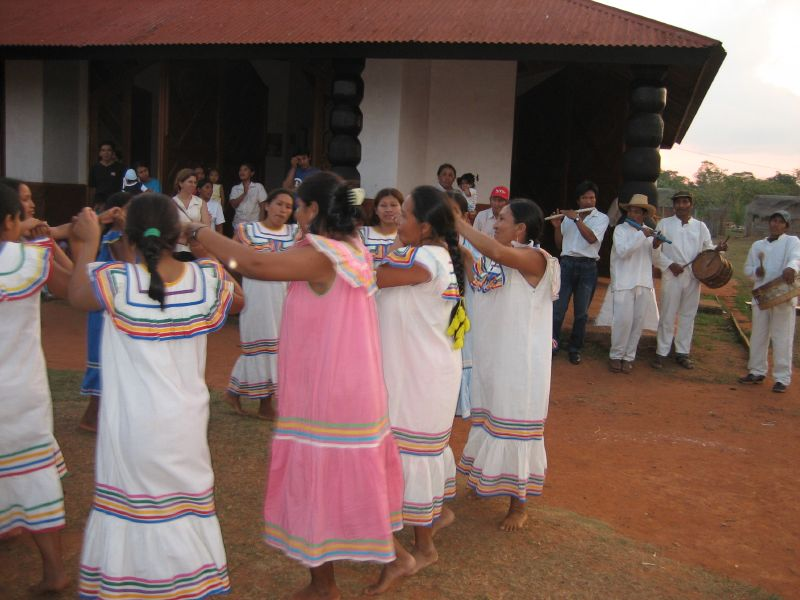
Taquirari

The Tipoy (of Guaraní origin) is considered part of the traditional clothing of Camba women and is commonly worn in the Bolivian east.

== Language ==
Camba Spanish was originally spoken in Santa Cruz Department, Bolivia, but is now also spoken in Beni Department and Pando Department. Nikulin (2019) proposes that Camba Spanish has a Piñoco Chiquitano substratum.
