= Campanero =

- Town
- Location of Paurito city in Bolivia
- Coordinates: 17°44′02″S 62°57′05″W
- Country: Bolivia
- Department: Santa Cruz Department
- Province: Andrés Ibáñez Province
- Elevation: 1,125 ft (343 m)

Population (2009)
  - Total: 3,020
- Time zone: UTC-4 (BOT)

Campanero is a small town in the Santa Cruz Department in the South American Andean Republic of Bolivia.

== Location ==
Campanero is the second largest town of Cantón Cotoca and is located in Cotoca Municipality in Andrés Ibáñez Province. It is situated at an elevation of 343 m, eighteen kilometers west of Río Grande, one of the largest rivers in the Bolivian lowlands.

== Roads ==
Campanero is located 24 kilometers east of the departmental capital Santa Cruz.
From the centre of Santa Cruz, Avenue Virgen de Cotoca leads to the east, passes Cotoca after 18 km and reaches Campanero after another six kilometers.

From there, Ruta 4/Ruta 9 goes on to Puerto Pailas where it crosses the Río Grande and reaches Pailón on the river's eastern banks. From Pailón, Ruta 4 goes further east for another 587 km before it reaches Puerto Suárez on the Brazilian border, while Ruta 9 goes north to Guayaramerin after 1175 km.

== Population ==
The population of the town has increased rapidly over the past two decades:

- 1992: 930 inhabitants
- 2001: 2,212 inhabitants
- 2009: 3,020 inhabitants

Due to the population movements over the past decades, the region has a certain amount of Quechua population, in Cotoca Municipality 17.8 percent of the population speak the Quechua language.
