= Montero Hoyos =

- Town
- Location of Montero Hoyos city in Bolivia
- Coordinates: 17°38′26″S 62°49′02″W
- Country: Bolivia
- Department: Santa Cruz Department
- Province: Andrés Ibáñez Province

Population (2009)
  - Total: 2,064
- Time zone: UTC-4 (BOT)

Montero Hoyos is a small town in the Santa Cruz Department in the South American Andean Republic of Bolivia.

== Location ==
Montero Hoyos is the central town of Cantón Montero Hoyos and is located in Santa Cruz Municipality in Andrés Ibáñez Province. It is situated at an elevation of 303 m on the left banks of the Río Grande.

== Roads ==
Montero Hoyos is located 51 kilometers north-east of the departmental capital Santa Cruz. From Santa Cruz the tarmac road Ruta 4/Ruta 9 goes east through Cotoca and Puerto Pailas before it crosses the Río Grande and reaches Pailón on the river's eastern banks. From Pailón, Ruta 4 goes further east for another 587 km before it reaches Puerto Suárez on the Brazilian border, while Ruta 9 goes north to Guayaramerin after 1175 km.

At Puerto Pailas, a dirt road leaves the Rutas 4/9 in north-westerly direction for another 4 km to Montero Hoyos.

== Population ==
The population of the place has increased rapidly over the past two decades.
The town had 985 inhabitants at the 1992 census, then 1,512 at the 2001 census, and has now 2,064 inhabitants (2009 est.).
Due to the population movements over the past decades, the region has a certain amount of Quechua population, in the Santa Cruz Municipality 12.0 percent of the population speak the Quechua language.
