= Paurito =

- Town
- Location of Paurito city in Bolivia
- Coordinates: 17°52′49″S 62°56′39″W
- Country: Bolivia
- Department: Santa Cruz Department
- Province: Andrés Ibáñez Province
- Elevation: 1,168 ft (356 m)

Population (2009)
  - Total: 2,113
- Time zone: UTC-4 (BOT)

Paurito is a small town in the Santa Cruz Department in the South American Andean Plurinational State of Bolivia.

== Location ==
Paurito is the central town of Cantón Paurito and is located in Santa Cruz Municipality in Andrés Ibáñez Province. It is situated at an elevation of 356 m fourteen kilometers west of Río Grande, one of the largest rivers in the Bolivian lowlands.

== Roads ==
Paurito is located 27 kilometers south-east of the departmental capital Santa Cruz. From Santa Cruz, the tarmac road Ruta 4/Ruta 9 goes 18 km east to Cotoca and then to Puerto Pailas where it crosses the Río Grande and reaches Pailón on the river's eastern banks. From Pailón, Ruta 4 goes further east for another 587 km before it reaches Puerto Suárez on the Brazilian border, while Ruta 9 goes north to Guayaramerin after 1175 km. At Cotoca, a dirt road leaves the Rutas 4/9 in a southern direction and reaches Paurito after sixteen kilometers.

== Population ==
The population of Paurito has increased rapidly over the past two decades as the following table shows:

Population development
Year	Inhabitants
1992	1 027
2001	1 548
2009	2 113

Due to the population movements over the past decades, the region has a certain amount of Quechua population, in the Santa Cruz Municipality 12.0 percent of the population speak the Quechua language.
