= Don Lorenzo, Bolivia =

Don Lorenzo
- Town
- Location of Paurito city in Bolivia
- Coordinates: 17°48′25″S 62°52′42″W
- Country: Bolivia
- Department: Santa Cruz Department
- Province: Andrés Ibáñez Province
- Elevation: 1,109 ft (338 m)

Population (2009)
  - Total: 2,292
- Time zone: UTC-4 (BOT)

Don Lorenzo is a small town in the Santa Cruz Department in the South American Andean Republic of Bolivia.

== Location ==
Don Lorenzo is the third largest town of Cantón Cotoca and is located in Cotoca Municipality in Andrés Ibáñez Province. It is situated at an elevation of 338 m, ten kilometers west of Río Grande, one of the largest rivers in the Bolivian lowlands.

== Roads ==
Don Lorenzo is located 36 kilometers east of the departmental capital Santa Cruz.
From the centre of Santa Cruz, Avenue 3 Pasos Al Frente leads to the east and leaves the outskirts of the city after twelve kilometers. The road goes further east for another 24 km before it reaches Don Lorenzo.
From Don Lorenzo, a twelve kilometer long road goes north where it meets the tarmac road Ruta 4/Ruta 9 that goes from Santa Cruz to Cotoca and then to Puerto Pailas where it crosses the Río Grande and reaches Pailón on the river's eastern banks. From Pailón, Ruta 4 goes further east for another 587 km before it reaches Puerto Suárez on the Brazilian border, while Ruta 9 goes north to Guayaramerin after 1175 km.

== Population ==
The population of the place has increased rapidly over the past two decades:

- 1992: 464 inhabitants
- 2001: 1,679 inhabitants
- 2009: 2,292 inhabitants

Due to the population movements over the past decades, the region has a certain amount of Quechua population, in Cotoca Municipality 17.8 percent of the population speak the Quechua language.
