= Tiquipaya, Santa Cruz =

Tiquipaya (Santa Cruz)
- Town
- Interactive map of Tiquipaya (Santa Cruz)
- Coordinates: 18°05′47″S 63°27′02″W
- Country: Bolivia
- Department: Santa Cruz
- Province: Andrés Ibáñez
- Municipality: El Torno
- Time zone: UTC-4 (BOT)

Tiquipaya is a small town near the departmental capital city of Santa Cruz, Bolivia.

== Location ==
Tiquipaya is the second largest city of the Cantón Jorochito municipality in the Andrés Ibáñez Province. The city lies at an altitude of 584 m on the right bank of the Rio Pirai between the cities of El Torno and La Angostura.

== Geography ==
Tiquipaya is located in the tropical humid climate on the eastern edge of the Andean mountain range of the Cordillera Oriental . The region used to be subtropical rainforest, but is now mostly farmland . The average temperature of the region is 24 °C, the annual precipitation is 950 mm (see La Angostura climate chart ). The monthly average temperatures vary between 20 °C in July and 26 °C in December and January, the monthly rainfall from November to March is high and is more than 100 mm and from June to September, but the climate is usually arid, with rainfall less than 40 mm.

== Transport ==
Tiquipaya is 47 kilometers by road southwest of Santa Cruz, the capital of the area. The paved highway Ruta leads from the center of Santa Cruz leads in four-lanes, called Grigota Avenue, in a southwesterly direction through the towns of El Carmen, La Guardia and El Torno to Limoncito, and closer to La Angostura, Samaipata and Comarapa to Cochabamba.

== Population ==
The population of the town has more than doubled in the past two decades. It was 849 inhabitants in the census in 1992, then 1,423 inhabitants at the 2001 census and now 1,942 inhabitants (2009 estimate). Because of the immigration history of the population, the region has a significant Quechua population. 27.7% of the population speak the Quechua language.
