= Gutiérrez, Cordillera =

Gutiérrez Kereimba Iyambae (Guarani)
- Town
- Interactive map of Gutiérrez
- Coordinates: 19.4247°S 63.5297°W
- Country: Bolivia
- Department: Santa Cruz Department
- Province: Cordillera Province
- Time zone: UTC-4 (BOT)
- Climate: Aw

Gutiérrez (Cordillera) is a small town in the Santa Cruz Department of Bolivia.
