= San José, Andrés Ibáñez =

San José
- Town
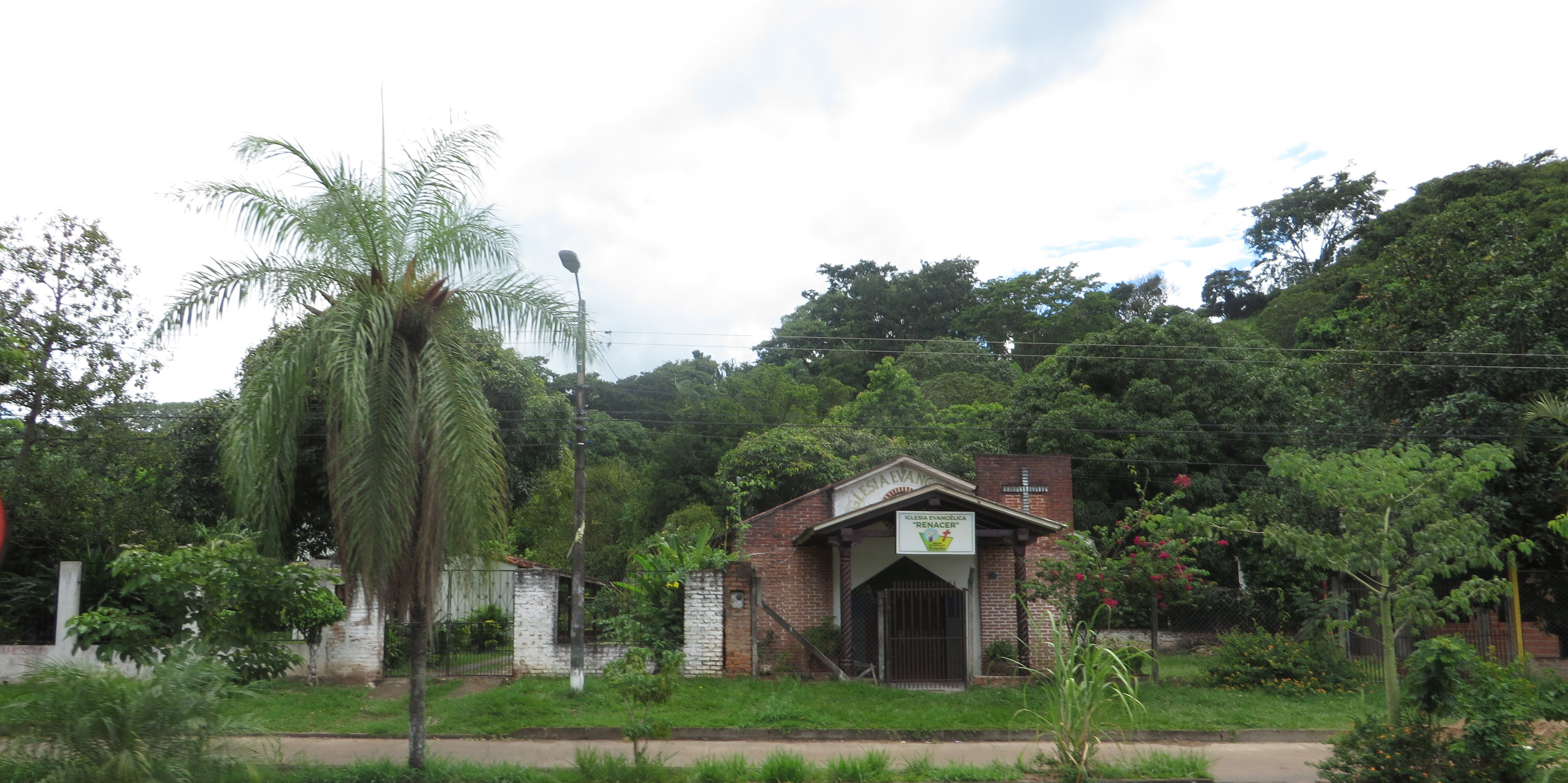

- Location of San José city in Bolivia
- Coordinates: 17°56′20″S 63°21′06″W
- Country: Bolivia
- Department: Santa Cruz Department
- Province: Andrés Ibáñez Province
- Elevation: 1,663 ft (507 m)

Population (2009)
  - Total: 2,791
- Time zone: UTC-4 (BOT)

San José is a small town in the Santa Cruz Department in the South American Andean Republic of Bolivia.

== Location ==
San José is the central town of Cantón San José and is located in La Guardia Municipality in Andrés Ibáñez Province. It is situated on the right banks of Río Piraí at an elevation of 507 m, south of the nearest town, La Guardia, and north of Santa Rita.

== Roads ==
San José is located 26 kilometers south-west of the departmental capital Santa Cruz.
From the centre of Santa Cruz, Grigota Avenue (Ruta 7) leads to the south-west, passes La Guardia and further leads to San José.
From there, Ruta 7 goes on to La Angostura, Samaipata, Comarapa and Cochabamba.

== Population ==
The population of the town has increased rapidly over the past two decades:

- 1992: 1,415 inhabitants
- 2001: 2,045 inhabitants
- 2009: 2,791 inhabitants

Due to the population movements over the past decades, the region has a certain amount of Quechua population, in La Guardia Municipality 17.1 percent of the population speak the Quechua language.
