= Porto Rico (disambiguation) =

Porto Rico is an old variant spelling of Puerto Rico, an unincorporated territory of the United States.

Porto Rico may also refer to:

- Porto Rico, Paraná, a municipality in the state of Paraná in the Southern Region of Brazil
- Porto Rico do Maranhão, a municipality in the state of Maranhão in the Northeast region of Brazil
- Porto Rico (British Columbia), a former settlement in British Columbia, Canada

== See also ==
- Puerto Rico (disambiguation)
- Souvenir de Porto Rico
