= Porongo =

- Municipal seat
- Location within Bolivia
- Coordinates: 17°51′12″S 63°18′31″W
- Country: Bolivia
- Department: Santa Cruz Department
- Province: Andrés Ibáñez Province
- Municipality: Porongo
- Elevation: 470 m (1,540 ft)

Population (2012)
  - Total: 1,433
- Time zone: UTC-4 (BOT)

Porongo is a village located in Andrés Ibáñez Province in Santa Cruz Department, Bolivia.

== Population ==
Year	Population	Source
1992	1,134	census
2001	1,185	census
2012	1,433	census
