= San Ignacio del Sara =

- Location in Bolivia
- Coordinates: 17°17′S 63°34′W
- Country: Bolivia
- Department: Santa Cruz Department
- Province: Sara Province
- Elevation: 915 ft (279 m)

Population (2012)
  - Total: 366
- Time zone: UTC-4 (BOT)
- Postal code: 07-0601-0300-8001
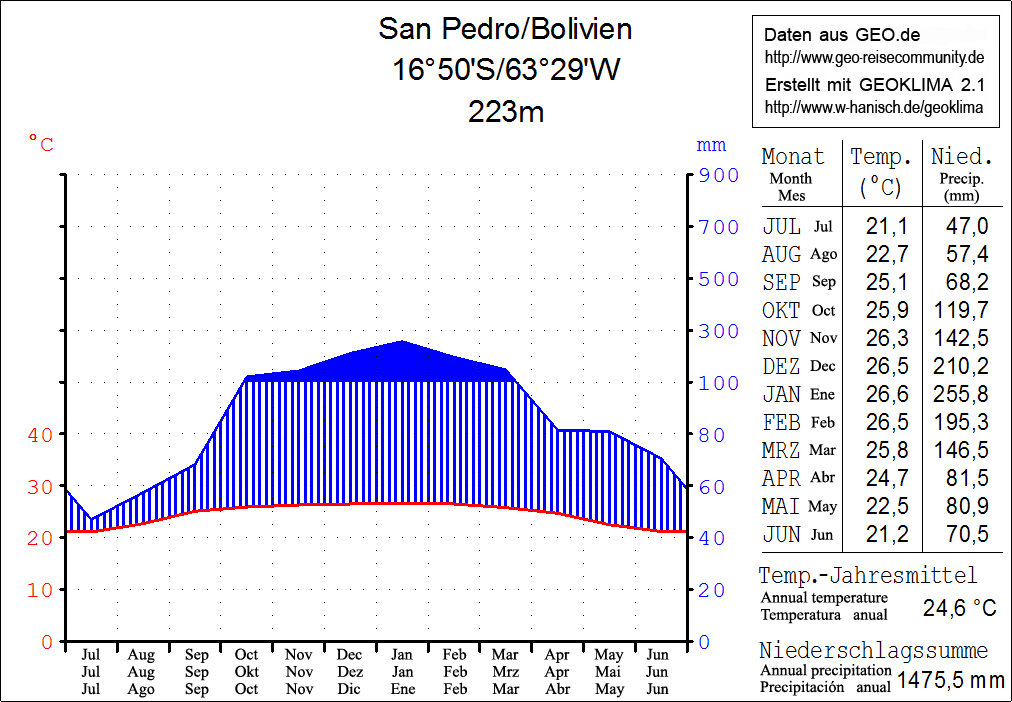
- Climate: San Pedro climate diagram (German)

San Ignacio del Sara is a town in the Santa Cruz department in the lowlands of the South American Andes state of Bolivia.

== Immediate location ==
San Ignacio del Sara is a central town of the San Ignacio del Sara canton in the district (Spanish: municipio) of Portachuelo in Sara province. The town lies at a height of 279 meters in the wet area between Río Yapacaní and Río Piraí.

== Geography ==
San Ignacio del Sara lies in the humid tropical climate before the eastern edge of the Cordillera Oriental Andean mountain chain. The region has only been developed in the last years and was covered with subtropical rainforest before colonization, but today it is mostly cultivated land.

The mean average temperature of the region is close to 25 °C (see San Pedro climate diagram); the monthly averages range between 21 °C in June/July and 26 to 27 °C from October to March. The yearly precipitation is nearly 1500 mm; the monthly average precipitation is fruitful and is between 50 mm in July and 250 mm in January.

== Transportation system ==
San Ignacio del Sara lies at a distance of 100 kilometers by road northwest of Santa Cruz, the capital of the department.

From Santa Cruz, the main asphalted Route 4 leads through Warnes and Montero to Portachuelo, and from there an additional 398 kilometers in a westerly direction to Cochabamba and a further 376 kilometers to Tambo Quemado on the Chilean border.

Ten kilometers after Portachuelo a country road branches off in a northwesterly direction, which leads through San Ignacio del Sara to Santa Rosa del Sara, where it meets the smooth Route 35, running east-west.

== Population ==
There were only minor fluctuations in the town's population in the past two decades.

Year	Population	Source
1992	374	National census
2001	407	National census
2012	366	National census
