= La Bélgica =

Coordinates: 17°33′S 63°13′W

- Town
- Interactive map of La Bélgica
- Country: Bolivia
- Department: Santa Cruz
- Province: Sara
- Municipality: Colpa Bélgica
- Time zone: UTC-4 (BOT)

La Bélgica is a town in Bolivia. It is located in Colpa Bélgica Municipality, Sara Province, Santa Cruz Department.
