= Limoncelli =

Limoncelli may refer to:

- Tom Limoncelli (born 1968), American system administrator, author, and speaker
- Limoncello, an Italian lemon liqueur mainly produced in southern Italy

== See also ==
- Limoncito (disambiguation)
