= Don Lorenzo =

Don Lorenzo may refer to:

- Don Lorenzo (film), a 1952 Italian film
- Don Lorenzo, Bolivia, a town in Santa Cruz Department, Bolivia
