= Puerto Rico, El Torno =

Coordinates: 18.0081°S 63.3933°W

Puerto Rico (El Torno)
- Town
- Interactive map of Puerto Rico (El Torno)
- Country: Bolivia
- Department: Santa Cruz Department
- Province: Andrés Ibáñez Province
- Time zone: UTC-4 (BOT)

Puerto Rico is a small town in Andrés Ibáñez Province, Bolivia, just south of the town of El Torno.
