= Jorochito =

Coordinates: 18°03′S 63°26′W

- Town
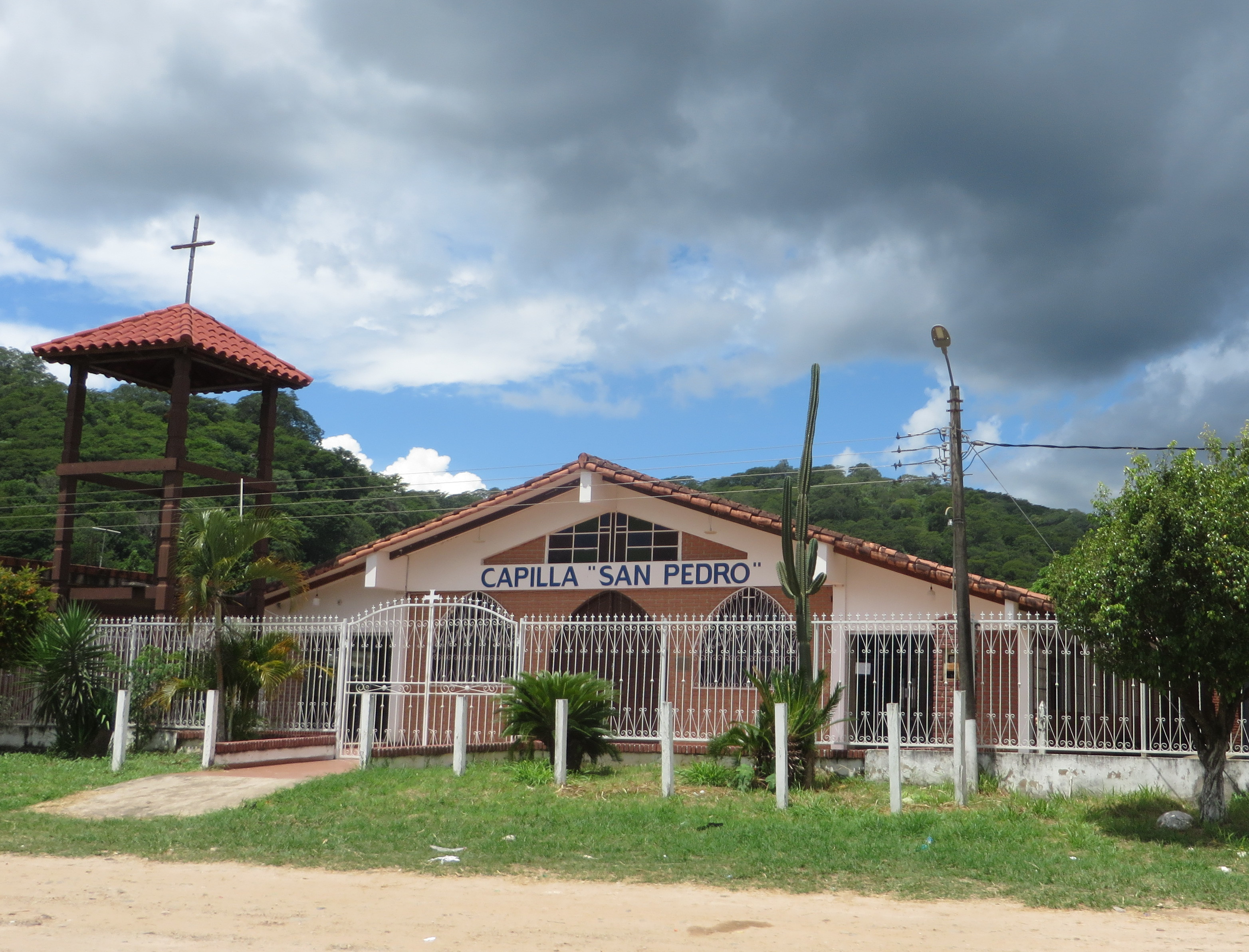
- Interactive map of Jorochito
- Country: Bolivia
- Time zone: UTC-4 (BOT)

Jorochito is a town in Santa Cruz, Bolivia, that lies along Route 7, southwest of Limoncito.
