= Puerto Rico (disambiguation) =

The Commonwealth of Puerto Rico is an unincorporated territory of the United States of America in the Caribbean Sea.

Puerto Rico may also refer to:

== Places ==
- Puerto Rico, Argentina, a city
- Puerto Rico, El Torno, Bolivia, a town
- Puerto Rico, Caquetá, Colombia, a town and municipality
- Puerto Rico, Meta, Colombia, a town and municipality
- Puerto Rico, Saipan, a village in the Northern Mariana Islands
- Puerto Rico de Gran Canaria, a holiday resort situated on the south-west coast of the Spanish island of Gran Canaria
- The original name for San Juan, Puerto Rico, the capital and largest city of the Commonwealth

== Arts and entertainment ==
- Puerto Rico (board game), a German board game
- "Puerto Rico", the title of numerous songs, see List of songs about Puerto Rico
- Teatro Puerto Rico, a former music hall in the Bronx, New York City

== Ships ==
- USS Puerto Rico, several United States Navy ships, one canceled
- SS Puerto Rico, an American cargo ship

== Other ==
- University of Puerto Rico school system
  - University of Puerto Rico, Río Piedras Campus, its largest campus

== See also ==
- Puerto Rico Trench, an oceanic trench on the Atlantic side of the Caribbean Islands
- Porto Rico (disambiguation)
