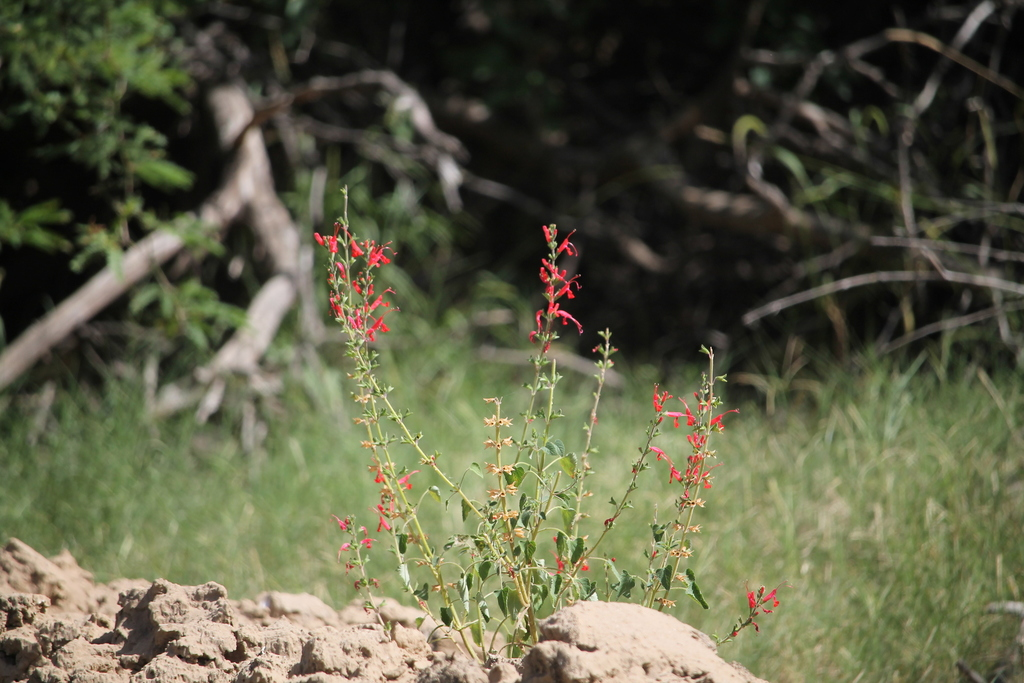

Scientific classification
- Kingdom: Plantae
- Clade: Tracheophytes
- Clade: Angiosperms
- Clade: Eudicots
- Clade: Asterids
- Order: Lamiales
- Family: Lamiaceae
- Genus: Salvia
- Species: S. exserta

Binomial name
- Salvia exserta Griseb.

Synonyms
- Salvia praeclara Epling

= Salvia exserta =

Species of herb

Salvia exserta is a species of flowering plant in the family Lamiaceae. It is an annual herb that is native to the Rio Grande basin in Bolivia, and south into Argentina. It grows in stony ground in dry woodland at 1,300 to 2,700 m (4,300 to 8,900 ft) elevation.

S. exserta reaches up to 1.5 metres (4.9 ft) high, with long petiolate leaves that are 3 to 12 cm (1.2 to 4.7 in) by 2 to 12 cm (0.79 to 4.72 in). The inflorescence of terminal racemes is 5 to 30 cm (2.0 to 11.8 in) long, with a red corolla that is 1.7 to 2.8 cm (0.67 to 1.10 in). The corolla has an upper lip that is much longer than the lower.
