= Guadalupe, Vallegrande =

Guadalupe (Vallegrande)
- Town
- Location within Bolivia
- Coordinates: 18°33′S 64°5′W
- Country: Bolivia
- Department: Santa Cruz Department
- Time zone: UTC-4 (BOT)

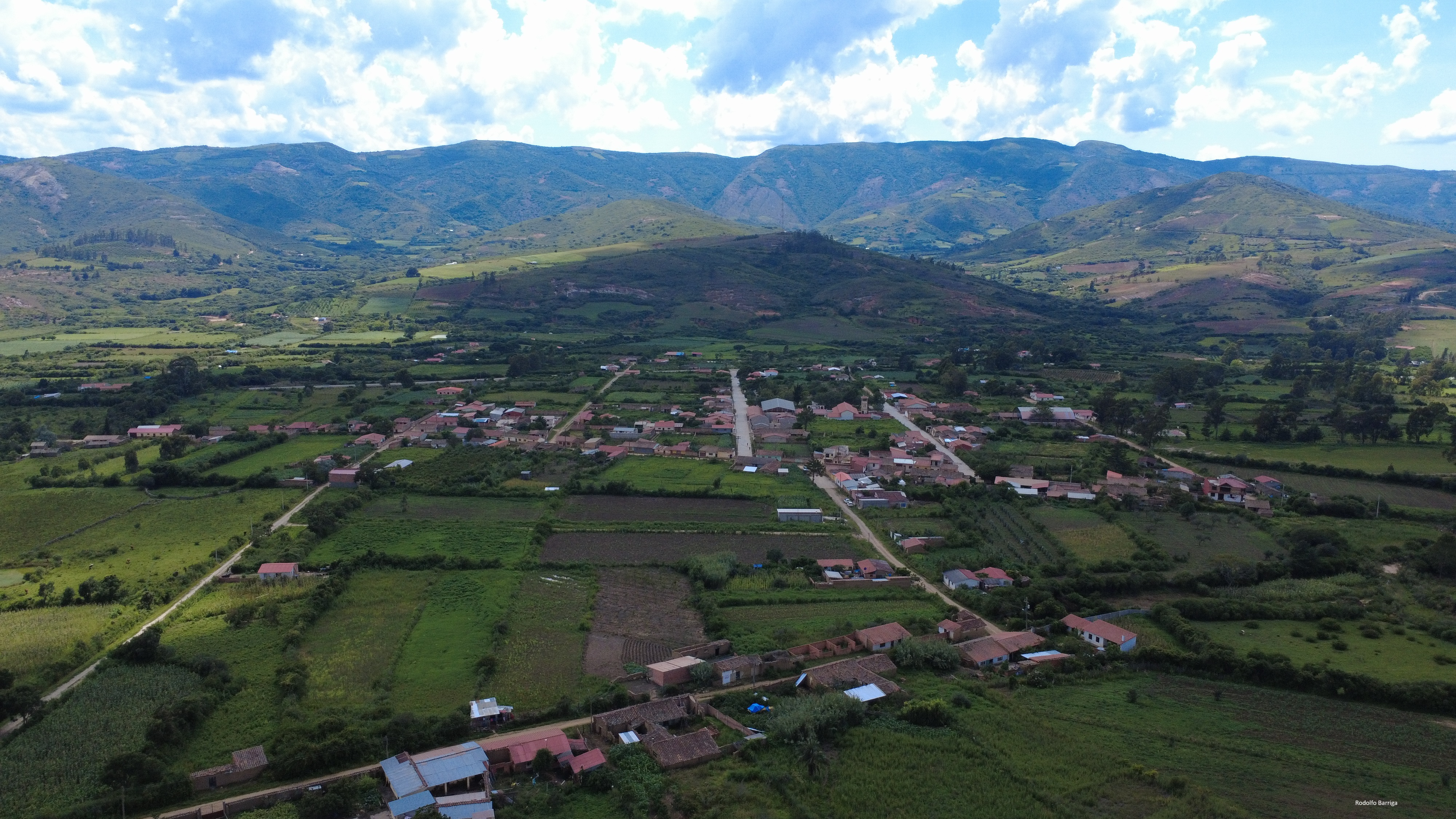
Aerial view of Guadalupe, Vallegrande, Bolivia

Guadalupe (Vallegrande) is a small town in Santa Cruz, Bolivia.
