= Lagunillas, Santa Cruz =

Lagunillas
- Location of Lagunillas within Bolivia
- Coordinates: 19°39′S 63°41′W
- Country: Bolivia
- Department: Santa Cruz Department
- Province: Cordillera Province
- Municipality: Lagunillas Municipality
- Canton: Lagunillas Canton
- Elevation: 3,009 ft (917 m)

Population (2001)
  - Total: 958
- Time zone: UTC-4 (BST)
- Climate: Cwa

Lagunillas is a location in the Santa Cruz Department in Bolivia. It is the seat of the Lagunillas Municipality, the first municipal section of the Cordillera Province.
