= Puerto Pailas =

Puerto Pailas Pailas
- Town
- Location of Puerto Pailas city in Bolivia
- Coordinates: 17°40′03″S 62°47′27″W
- Country: Bolivia
- Department: (Santa Cruz Province, Argentina) Santa Cruz Department
- Province: Andrés Ibáñez Province
- Municipality: Cotoca

Population (2009)
  - Total: 3,141
- Time zone: UTC-4 (BOT)

Puerto Pailas is a canton and town in the Santa Cruz Department in the South American Andean Republic of Bolivia.

== Location ==
Puerto Pailas is the central town of Puerto Pailas Cantón and is located in Cotoca Municipality in Andrés Ibáñez Province. It is situated at an elevation of 297 m on the left banks of Río Grande, one of the longest rivers in the Bolivian lowlands, which is 1,200 m wide at this place and is spanned by a road bridge here.

== Roads ==
It sits a strategically important place within the region's road network, located 47 kilometers east of the departmental capital Santa Cruz, on the principal route from that city to Beni, the Chiquitanía, and Brazil. From Santa Cruz the tarmac road Ruta 4/Ruta 9 goes east through Cotoca to Puerto Pailas where it crosses the Río Grande and reaches Pailón on the river's eastern banks. From Pailón, Ruta 4 goes further east for another 587 km before it reaches Puerto Suárez on the Brazilian border, while Ruta 9 goes north to Guayaramerin after 1175 km.

At Puerto Pailas, a dirt road leaves the Rutas 4 and 9 in north-westerly direction and goes 4 km to the neighbouring town Montero Hoyos.

== Population ==
The population of the place has increased rapidly over the past two decades.

The town had 1,621 inhabitants at the 1992 census, then 2,301 at the 2001 census, and has now 3,141 inhabitants (2009 est.). Due to the population movements over the past decades, the region has a certain amount of Quechua population, in Puerto Pailas Municipality 17.8 percent of the population speak the Quechua language.
