= Vaca Díez Province =

Coordinates: 11.417°S 65.667°W

Vaca Díez is a province in the Beni Department, Bolivia. The two largest settlements in Vaca Díez are Guayaramerín with a population of 35,764 in 2012, along with Riberalta with a population of 78,754. Vaca Díez measures 16,228 km^{2} (10,083 miles) in size.

== See also ==
- Alto Ivon
- Exaltación, Vaca Diéz
