= Limoncito (disambiguation) =

Limoncito is a small town in the Santa Cruz Department in Bolivia.

Limoncito is Spanish for 'little lemon', and may also refer to the common names of two fruits in the Philippines:

- × Citrofortunella microcarpa, the calamondin or calamansi, also known as limoncito or limonsito
- Triphasia trifolia, the limeberry, also known as limoncitong kastila or limonsitong kastila (literally "Spanish limoncito")
