= Santa Rita, El Torno =

Coordinates: 17°58′47″S 63°22′15″W

Santa Rita (El Torno)
- Town
- Interactive map of Santa Rita (El Torno)
- Country: Bolivia
- Department: Santa Cruz Department
- Time zone: UTC-4 (BOT)

Santa Rita (El Torno) is a small town in Bolivia.
