= Exaltación, Vaca Diéz =

Exaltación
- Location of Exaltación, Vaca Diéz town in Bolivia
- Coordinates: 11°27′S 66°34′W
- Country: Bolivia
- Department: Beni Department
- Province: Vaca Diéz Province
- Time zone: UTC-4 (BOT)

Exaltación is a town in Vaca Diéz Province in the Beni Department of northern Bolivia.
