= Alto Ivon =

- Location in Bolivia
- Coordinates: 11°52′24″S 66°2′13″W
- Country: Bolivia
- Department: Beni Department
- Province: Vaca Díez Province
- Municipality: Riberalta Municipality
- Canton: Ivon Canton

Population (2012)
  - Total: 509
- Time zone: UTC-4 (BOT)

Alto Ivon is a village in the Vaca Díez Province, in the Beni Department of Bolivia.
