= Ipitá =

Coordinates: 19°20′S 63°32′W

- Town
- Interactive map of Ipitá
- Country: Bolivia
- Time zone: UTC-4 (BOT)

Ipitá is a small town in Bolivia.
