= Pulquina =

- Town
- Interactive map of Pulquina
- Coordinates: 18.0997°S 64.4303°W
- Country: Bolivia
- Time zone: UTC-4 (BOT)

Pulquina is a small town in Bolivia.
