= Virgen de Cotoca =

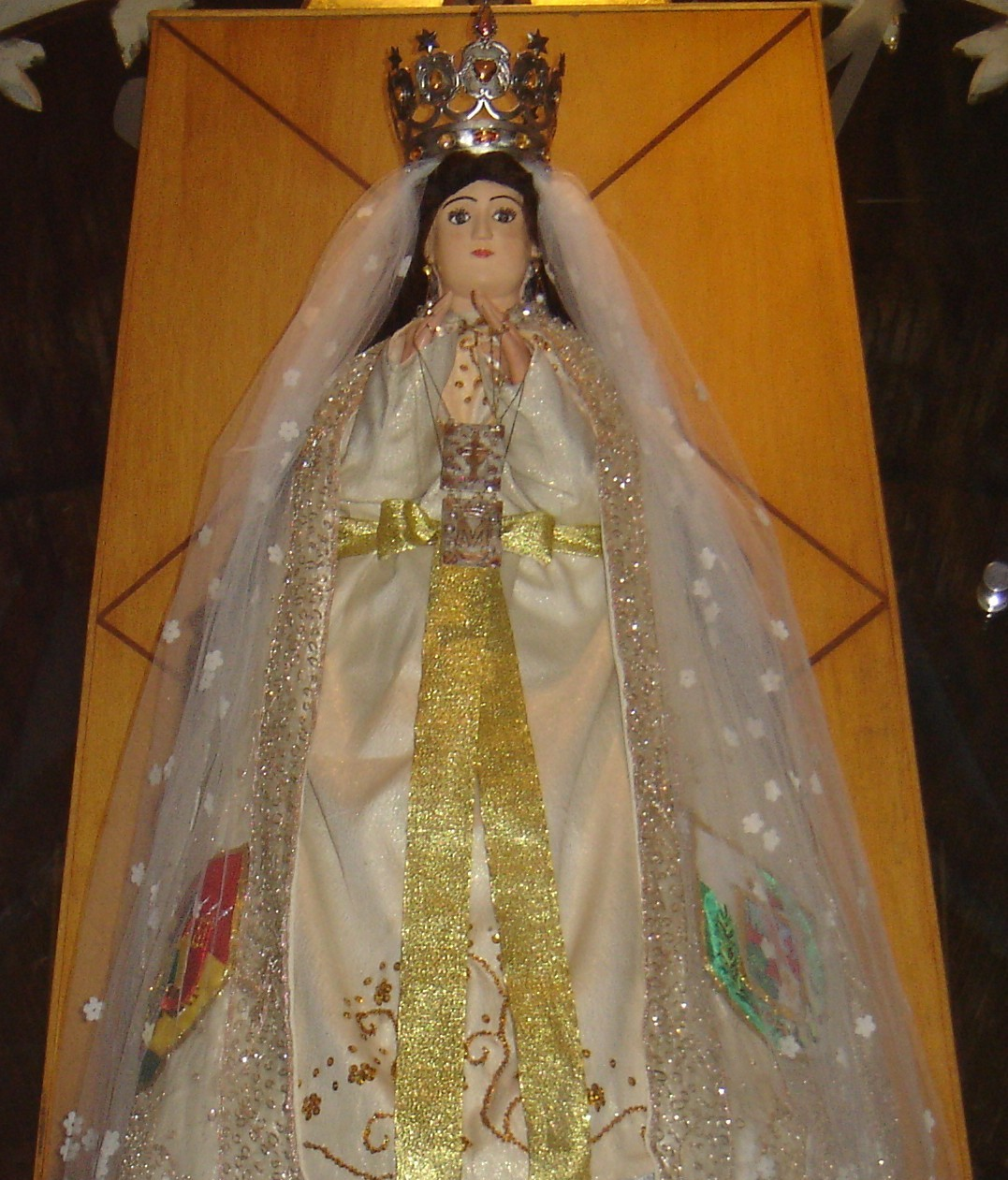

Blessed Virgin of Cotoca
- Venerated in: Roman Catholic Church
- Major shrine: Sanctuary of the Virgin of Cotoca, Cotoca, Bolivia
- Feast: 8 December to 15 December
- Attributes: Statue of the Blessed Virgin Mary, white embroidered mantle, gold crown and jewelry, scapuler
- Patronage: Santa Cruz, Eastern Bolivia

The Virgen de Cotoca (literal translation: Virgin of Cotoca; figurative translation: Our Lady of Cotoca; variant: Blessed Virgin of Cotoco) is the patroness saint for the Department of Santa Cruz, Bolivia. Her image is located in a shrine built in her honor and located in the City of Cotoca in the Department of Santa Cruz, Bolivia. The Virgin of Cotoca is venerated by thousands of Bolivians who ask for her intercession for blessings and other petitions.

There is one feast day dedicated to the Virgin of Cotoca, but it is celebrated over the course of 8 days. The celebration begins 8 December, which is also the feast of the Immaculate Conception celebrated by Roman Catholics. The celebration of the Virgin of Cotoca ends on 15 December. Throughout the 8 days, but primarily on the first and 8th day, thousands of devoted Bolivians make pilgrimages to the shrine where the image is located in Cotoca.

== History ==
=== The legend ===
The exact origin of the image of the Virgin of Cotoca is not entirely clear. Popular imagination has converted the origin into various legends. The most popular legend tells of two lumberman who, while attempting to cut down a tree, found a beautiful image of the Virgin Mary in the trunk of the tree.

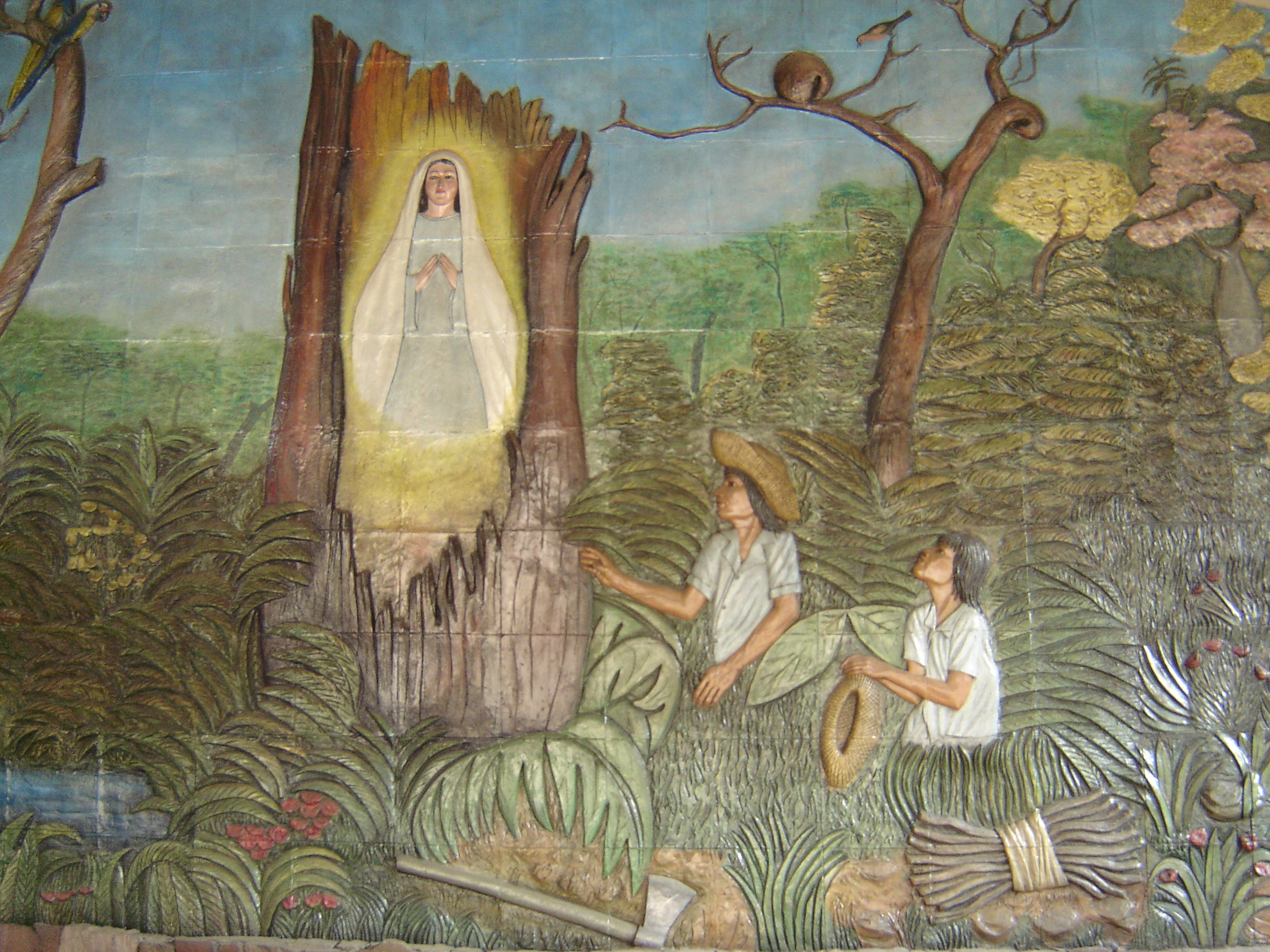
Mural showing the legend of the first apparition of the Virgin of Cotoca, created by Germán Miguel García Miranda

The City of Cotoca, where the image is currently housed, most likely began as a village started by a small agricultural community. Due to Cotoca’s geographical location, it has always been a regular stop for many travelers on their way from the nearby capital Santa Cruz to the Chiquitania territory in Bolivia and to the country of Brazil. Up through well into the 19th century, the population of Cotoca primarily consisted of Afro-Bolivianos and mulattos who worked as slaves on the local sugar cane haciendas.

The legend of the original apparition of the Virgin of Cotoca involves several runaway slaves. This legend is well known due to the writer Aquiles Gomez. In Gomez's writings, he relates that several slaves were unjustly accused by their patron of assassinating another hacienda owner. The slaves escaped into the surrounding jungle to avoid their own death. According to the legend, two of the slaves were looking for firewood when they suddenly came upon a majestic image of the Virgin Mary in the trunk of a tree. The slaves were Christian and prayed fervently that the Virgin would intercede for them so as to establish their innocence of the crime. The slaves carefully removed the trunk with the image and took it to Cotoca to show their patron in hopes that he would believe that they had not killed the man in question. When the slaves arrived in Cotoca, they were greeted with the news that the actual killer had already confessed to the crime. Remarkably, the confession is said to have occurred exactly the same day and hour that the slaves had come upon the image in the tree.

This event is considered to be the first of many miracles attributed to the Virgin of Cotoca.

In 1799, primarily due to the miracles said to be occurring because of the Virgin of Cotoca's intercession, the Catholic Church in Bolivia authorized the construction of a shrine to be built in her honor. The first mass was celebrated at the shrine on December 15, 1800.

=== The image ===
The statue of the Virgin of Cotoca is of neatly carved wood polished in polychrome. She is covered with golden jewelry and crowned with a bejeweled crown. The image wears a white or sky-blue mantle with gold trim, emblazoned with the coat of arms of Bolivia and of the Archdiocese of Santa Cruz, and holds a white scapular in her hands.

=== Devotion ===
Although it has undergone numerous renovations over time, the Shrine of the Virgin of Cotoca still exists in Cotoca and is currently cared for by the Dominican priests. Those making pilgrimages to the sanctuary usually do so on foot, beginning in the City of Santa Cruz located approximately 20 kilometers outside of Cotoca.
