= Limoncito =

- City
- Location within Bolivia
- Coordinates: 18°2′S 63°24′W
- Country: Bolivia
- Department: Santa Cruz Department
- Province: Andrés Ibáñez Province
- Municipality: El Torno Municipality

Population (2001)
  - Total: 3,064
- Time zone: UTC-4 (BOT)

Limoncito is a town in the Santa Cruz Department in Bolivia.
