= Porto Rico, Paraná =

Coordinates: 22°46′19″S 53°16′01″W

- Municipality
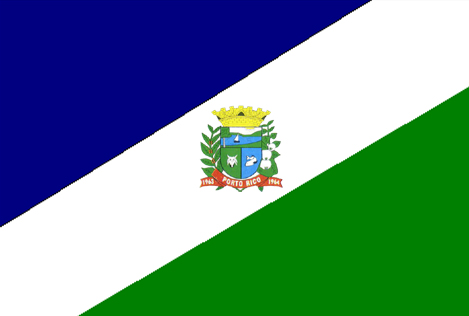
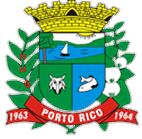
- Flag Coat of arms
- Interactive map of Porto Rico, Paraná
- Country: Brazil
- Region: Southern
- State: Paraná
- Mesoregion: Noroeste Paranaense

Population (2020)
  - Total: 2,556
- Time zone: UTC−3 (BRT)

Porto Rico, Paraná is a municipality in the state of Paraná in the South Region of Brazil.

== See also ==
- List of municipalities in Paraná
