= Sara Province =

Province in Bolivia

Provincia Sara
- Province
- Interactive map of Provincia Sara
- Coordinates: 17.000°S 63.583°W
- Country: Bolivia
- Department: Santa Cruz

Area
  - Total: 6,886 km^{2} (2,659 sq mi)

Population (2024)
  - Total: 44,713
  - Density: 6.493/km^{2} (16.82/sq mi)
- ISO 3166 code: BO.SC.SG

Sara is a province in the Santa Cruz Department, Bolivia. Its capital is Portachuelo.

== Subdivision ==
The province is divided into three municipalities which are further subdivided into cantons.

Section	Municipality	Seat
1st	Portachuelo Municipality	Portachuelo
2nd	Santa Rosa del Sara Municipality	Santa Rosa del Sara
3rd	Colpa Bélgica Municipality	La Bélgica
