= Cordillera Province (Bolivia) =

Cordillera
- Province
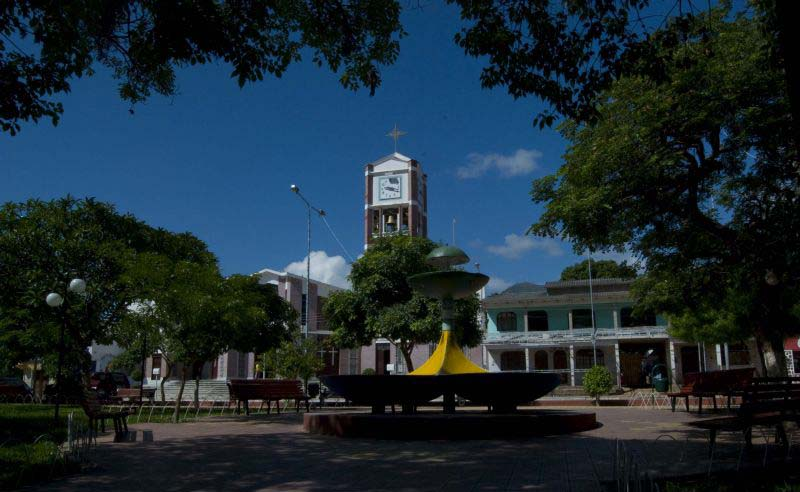
- San Francisco Church in Camiri

- Flag

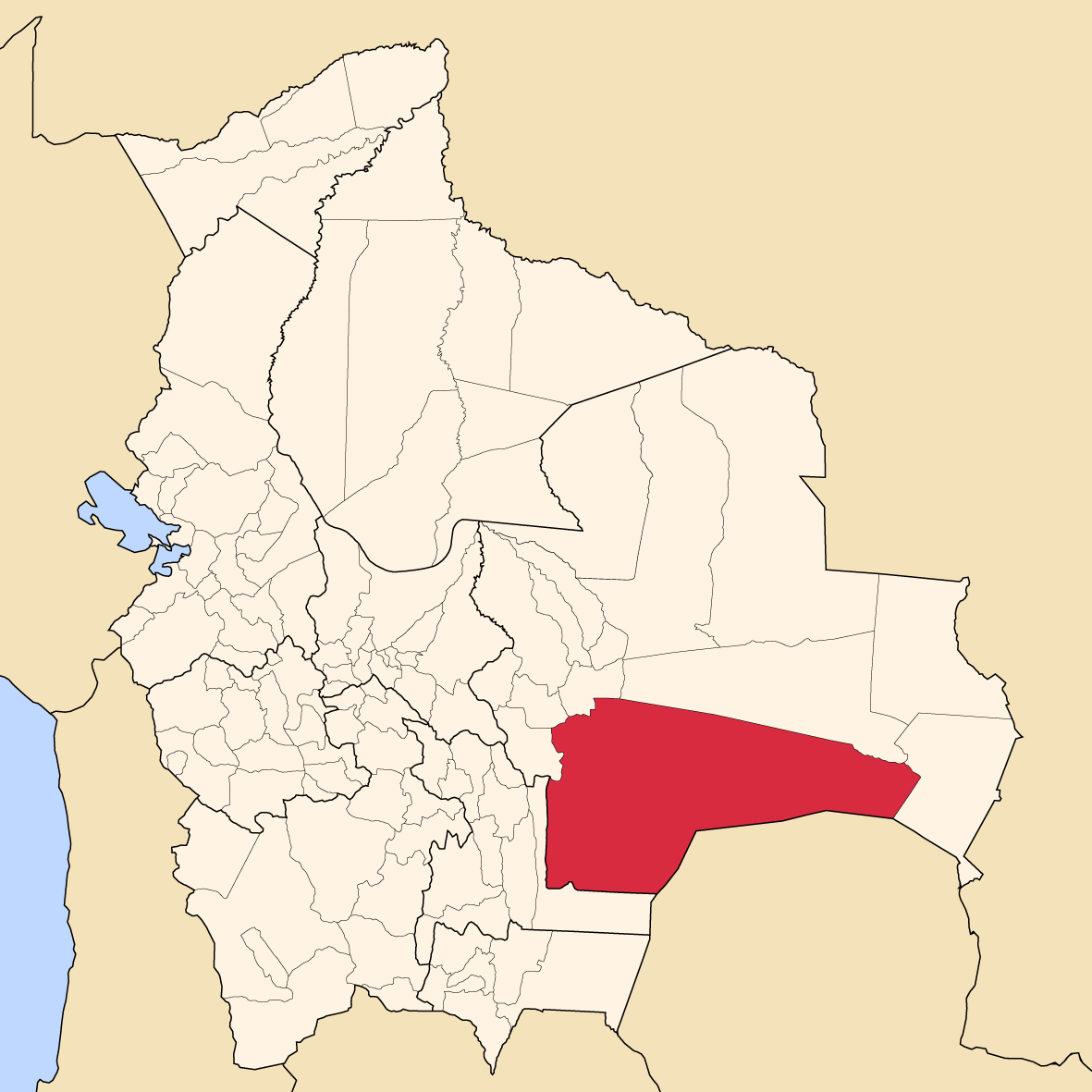
- Location of the Cordillera Province within Bolivia

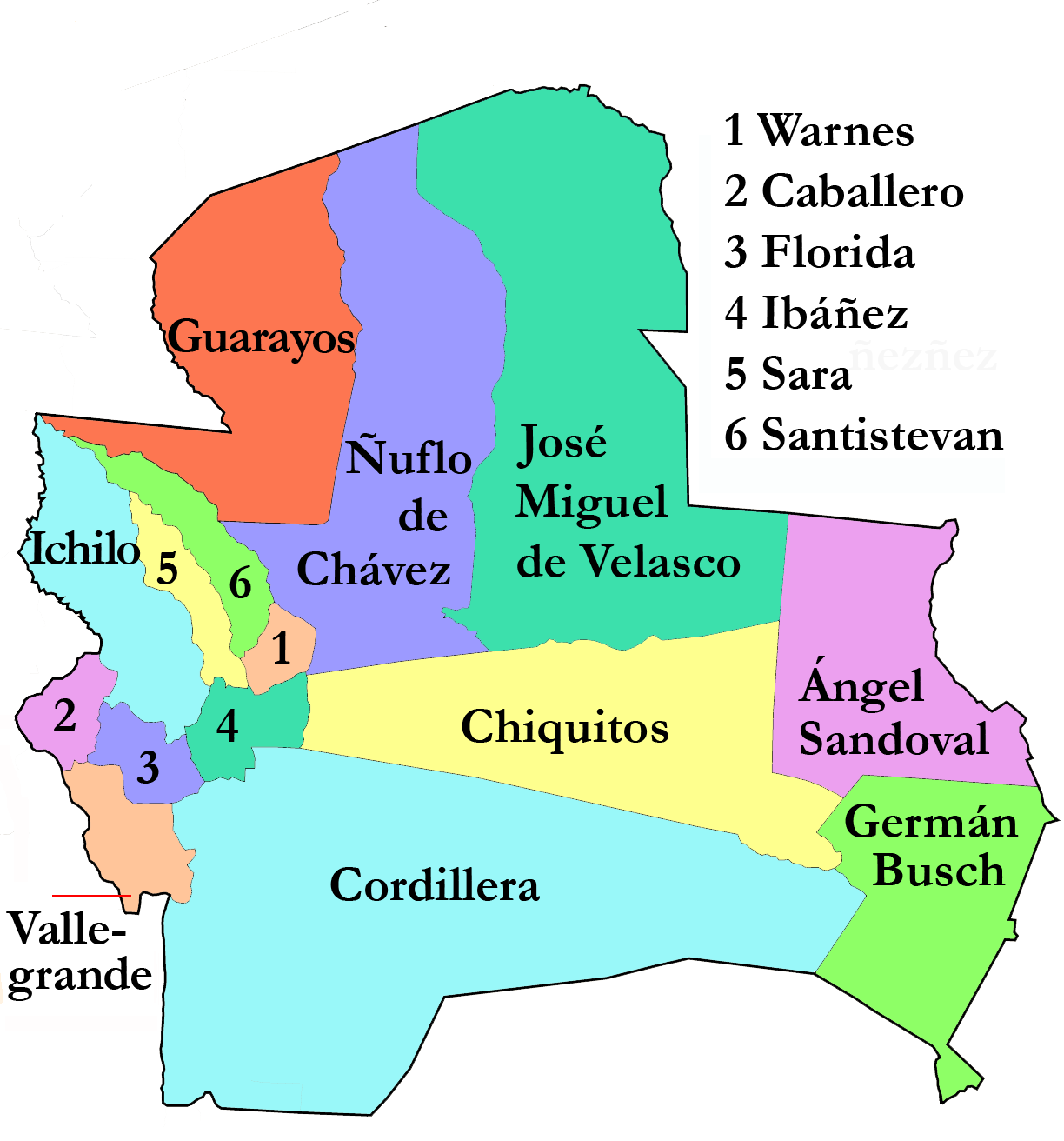
- Provinces of the Santa Cruz Department
- Coordinates: 19°13′S 61°15′W
- Country: Bolivia
- Department: Santa Cruz Department
- Municipalities: 7
- Cantons: 19
- Foundation: January 23, 1826
- Capital: Lagunillas

Area
  - Total: 33,299 sq mi (86,245 km^{2})

Population (2024)
  - Total: 134,713
  - Density: 4.0455/sq mi (1.5620/km^{2})
- Time zone: UTC-4 (BOT)
- Area code: BO.SC.CR
- Website: www.santacruz.gob.bo

Cordillera is a province in the Santa Cruz Department, Bolivia. Its capital is Lagunillas.

== Geography ==
This area of the Santa Cruz Chaco occupies the southern part of the department, is the largest province of the country, geographically defined as the Gran Chaco and that extends to the departments of Tarija and Chuquisaca and even the republics of Paraguay and Argentina. Characteristics of dry weather, warm day and cold at night. The name of this province is due to its topography, being the largest province in the department and the country. Bounded on the north by the provinces of Chiquitos and Andrés Ibáñez. The south by the Republic of Paraguay and the department of Chuquisaca. The east by the Germán Busch province. To the West and the department of Chuquisaca province Vallegrande Florida and has a surface area of 86,245 km² occupying 23.3% of the total area of the department, being the largest province of the country Its height above sea level is: 1240 m has a population: 190,768,098 inhabitants (2001 census). A population density: 1.49 people per km² Relief .- belongs to a clearly defined geographical area known as Gran Chaco, which extends to the departments of Chuquisaca and Tarija and the republics of Argentina and Paraguay. One of the three quarters of the territory is on the ramifications of (Cordillera Real or Oriental) This region is made up of parallel chains oriented from north to south decrease gradually increased until complete series of low hills. The remaining two thirds are just plain wet and covered with vegetation.

== Demographics ==
The latest census in Bolivia (2024) counted 134,713 people (122,369, aged 4 and over) in the province, out of which 16,138 were German-speaking Mennonites aged 4 and over or 13.2% of the entire population.

== Subdivision ==
The province is divided into seven municipalities which are further subdivided into cantons.

== History ==
La Cordillera de los Chiriguanosa or simply Cordillera is the word with which the colonial era began to know what is now the Cordillera Province and large surrounding territories. This name is because Chiriguanosa - Guarani occupied much of the Andean Cordillera orbit. The Royal Charter of 17 December 1743 established that the territory of the Cordillera Province came from the south to the banks of the Pilcomayo River, and the east to the Paraguay River. By a decree of January 23, 1826 issued under the presidency of Marshal Antonio José de Sucre, Cordillera Province was established with five departments of Bolivia. The DS 24 September 1857 that is subject to Cordillera the political leadership of Santa Cruz, with total independence from Vallegrande. Only three months later, on December 25 DS 1857 leads to the creation of the political leadership of the Cordillera, which was not implemented. Act of 1863 are created in the prefectures and sub-departments and provinces, respectively, to replace the political leadership created by Supreme Decree on December 25, 1857. The sub would be the responsibility of raising the contribution indigenal. In 1877 The Board of Directors of the Cordillera province leads the Supreme Government a comprehensive note, accompanied by incontrovertible documents on the right of that province and the territories of Cuevo Ibo, sought by the department of Chuquisaca.

== Places of interest ==
- Kaa-Iya del Gran Chaco National Park and Integrated Management Natural Area
- Otuquis National Park and Integrated Management Natural Area
