= Pailón =

- Town
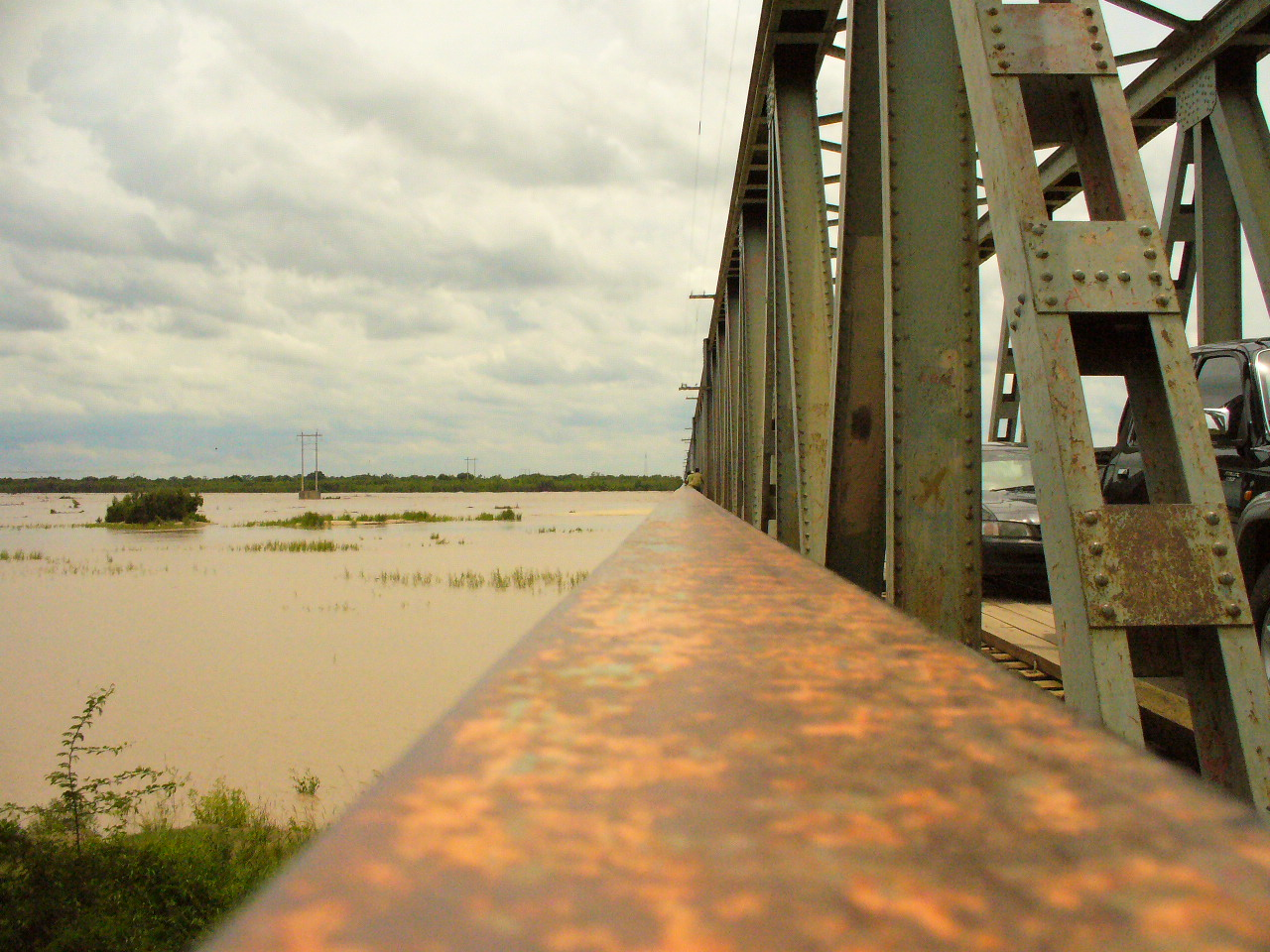
- Bridge over Río Grande between Pailón and Puerto Pailas

- Location within Bolivia
- Coordinates: 17°39′34″S 62°43′11″W
- Country: Bolivia
- Department: Santa Cruz Department
- Province: Chiquitos
- Municipality: Pailón

Area
  - Total: 10.155 km^{2} (3.921 sq mi)
- Elevation: 291 m (955 ft)

Population (2012)
  - Total: 9,850
- Census 2012
- Time zone: UTC-4 (BOT)
- Postal code: 07-0502-0101-9004
- Area code: (+591)

Pailón is a small town in Bolivia. It is in the second municipal section of Chiquitos Province and is 51 kilometres (32 mi) east of the city Santa Cruz de la Sierra.

== Climate ==
Climate data for Pailón, elevation 279 m (915 ft), (1988–2009)
Month	Jan	Feb	Mar	Apr	May	Jun	Jul	Aug	Sep	Oct	Nov	Dec	Year
Record high °C (°F)	36.5 (97.7)	38.1 (100.6)	36.5 (97.7)	35.4 (95.7)	36.5 (97.7)	35.3 (95.5)	34.3 (93.7)	36.1 (97.0)	38.3 (100.9)	38.3 (100.9)	37.5 (99.5)	36.4 (97.5)	38.3 (100.9)
Mean daily maximum °C (°F)	32.4 (90.3)	32.4 (90.3)	32.1 (89.8)	30.1 (86.2)	29.5 (85.1)	27.4 (81.3)	27.4 (81.3)	29.5 (85.1)	30.9 (87.6)	31.6 (88.9)	32.7 (90.9)	32.2 (90.0)	30.7 (87.2)
Daily mean °C (°F)	27.0 (80.6)	27.1 (80.8)	26.7 (80.1)	24.9 (76.8)	24.3 (75.7)	22.6 (72.7)	21.6 (70.9)	23.4 (74.1)	24.8 (76.6)	26.1 (79.0)	26.7 (80.1)	26.8 (80.2)	25.2 (77.3)
Mean daily minimum °C (°F)	21.6 (70.9)	21.8 (71.2)	21.3 (70.3)	19.8 (67.6)	19.0 (66.2)	17.8 (64.0)	15.8 (60.4)	17.2 (63.0)	18.7 (65.7)	20.6 (69.1)	20.8 (69.4)	21.3 (70.3)	19.6 (67.3)
Record low °C (°F)	16.1 (61.0)	15.2 (59.4)	16.1 (61.0)	10.1 (50.2)	7.2 (45.0)	8.2 (46.8)	3.0 (37.4)	6.8 (44.2)	9.2 (48.6)	12.1 (53.8)	12.3 (54.1)	10.0 (50.0)	3.0 (37.4)
Average precipitation mm (inches)	162.0 (6.38)	145.6 (5.73)	111.0 (4.37)	91.9 (3.62)	58.8 (2.31)	49.9 (1.96)	39.9 (1.57)	32.2 (1.27)	73.3 (2.89)	76.0 (2.99)	111.3 (4.38)	114.3 (4.50)	1,066.2 (41.97)
Average precipitation days	8.5	7.7	6.2	4.5	4.2	3.4	2.0	2.2	3.4	4.1	5.9	7.6	59.7
Source: Servicio Nacional de Meteorología e Hidrología de Bolivia
