= El Torno, Santa Cruz =

Coordinates: 17.9947°S 63.3842°W

El Torno (Santa Cruz)
- Town
- Interactive map of El Torno (Santa Cruz)
- Country: Bolivia
- Time zone: UTC-4 (BOT)

El Torno, Santa Cruz

El Torno (Santa Cruz) is a town in Bolivia. In 2010 it had an estimated population of 21,294.
