= Cotoca =

- Town
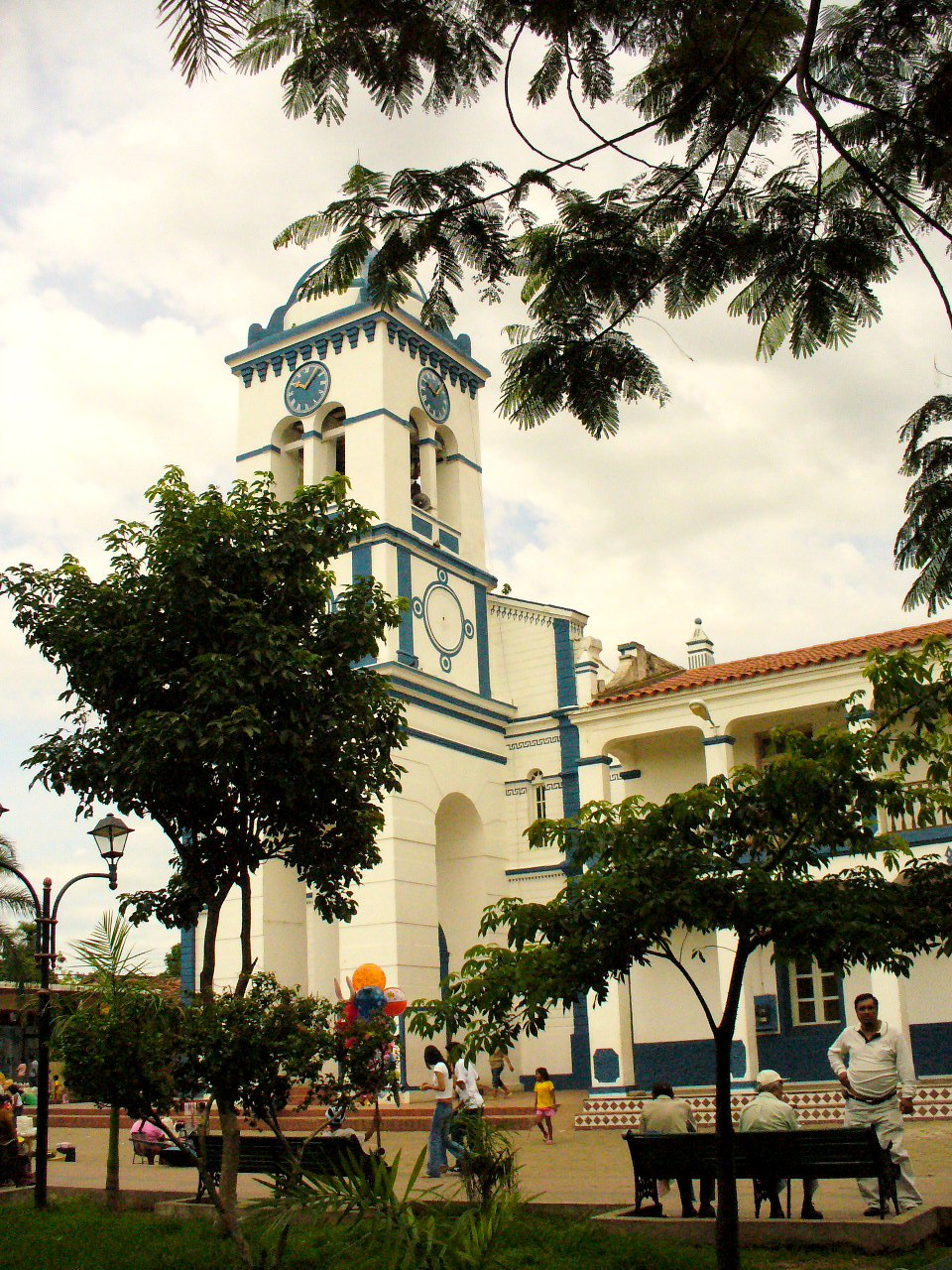
- Main church

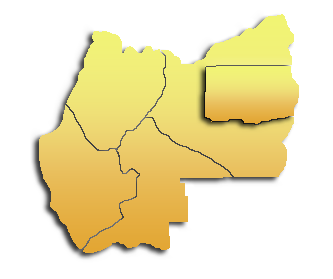
- Cotoca Municipality within Andrés Ibáñez

- Location within Bolivia
- Coordinates: 17°45′13″S 62°59′48″W
- Country: Bolivia
- Department: Santa Cruz Department
- Province: Andrés Ibáñez Province
- Municipality: Cotoca

Area
  - Total: 8.35 km^{2} (3.22 sq mi)
- Elevation: 363 m (1,191 ft)

Population (2012)
  - Total: 26,305
  - Density: 3,150/km^{2} (8,160/sq mi)
- Time zone: UTC-4 (BOT)
- Climate: Aw

Cotoca is a canton and Municipality of Andrés Ibáñez Province in Santa Cruz Department, Bolivia. The municipality consists of two cantons – Cotoca itself and Puerto Pailas. In 2010 it had an estimated population of 23,951 for the canton and 56,451 for the municipality.

In 1799, the Catholic Church authorised the building of a shrine to the Virgen de Cotoca, an image of Mary that was seen in the town. The Virgin is now the patron saint of the entire province of Santa Cruz and her feast from 8 to 15 December draws thousands of Bolivians.

The population increased tenfold in the last forty years:

Year	Canton	Municipality
1976	2,107	
1992	9,229	21,252
2001	15,181	36,425
2009	23 951	56,451

== Politics ==
In the Bolivian regional election, 2010, Cotoca placed the Verdes (Bolivia) party of Governor Rubén Costas first, although by less than the overall result for the province:

Party	Votes	%	% across Department
Verdes (Bolivia)	5,623	34.0%	50.6%
MAS	3,533	21.4%	36.3%
Tiluchi	3149	19.1%	n/a
SOL	3067	18.6%	n/a
ASIP	703	4.3%	n/a
Broad Front (MNR & Autonomia)	453	2.7%	4,3%

== Climate ==
Climate data for Cotoca, elevation 359 m (1,178 ft), (1991–2007)
Month	Jan	Feb	Mar	Apr	May	Jun	Jul	Aug	Sep	Oct	Nov	Dec	Year
Mean daily maximum °C (°F)	32.3 (90.1)	31.8 (89.2)	31.8 (89.2)	30.4 (86.7)	27.6 (81.7)	26.9 (80.4)	27.0 (80.6)	29.9 (85.8)	31.2 (88.2)	32.5 (90.5)	32.6 (90.7)	31.7 (89.1)	30.5 (86.9)
Daily mean °C (°F)	27.2 (81.0)	26.8 (80.2)	26.5 (79.7)	24.9 (76.8)	22.4 (72.3)	21.5 (70.7)	21.1 (70.0)	23.4 (74.1)	24.7 (76.5)	26.5 (79.7)	26.7 (80.1)	26.7 (80.1)	24.9 (76.8)
Mean daily minimum °C (°F)	22.0 (71.6)	21.7 (71.1)	21.2 (70.2)	19.6 (67.3)	17.1 (62.8)	16.2 (61.2)	15.3 (59.5)	16.8 (62.2)	18.3 (64.9)	20.5 (68.9)	20.8 (69.4)	21.6 (70.9)	19.3 (66.7)
Average precipitation mm (inches)	136.8 (5.39)	167.9 (6.61)	111.4 (4.39)	86.9 (3.42)	49.3 (1.94)	49.1 (1.93)	24.3 (0.96)	26.6 (1.05)	68.1 (2.68)	92.5 (3.64)	138.4 (5.45)	193.1 (7.60)	1,144.4 (45.06)
Average precipitation days	8.3	9.9	7.7	6.2	5.6	5.6	2.9	2.9	3.7	5.2	7.2	10.1	75.3
Average relative humidity (%)	91.5	91.6	91.1	90.9	90.3	89.3	87.8	87.4	88.2	88.9	89.2	91.2	89.8
Source: Servicio Nacional de Meteorología e Hidrología de Bolivia
