= Guayaramerín =

- City
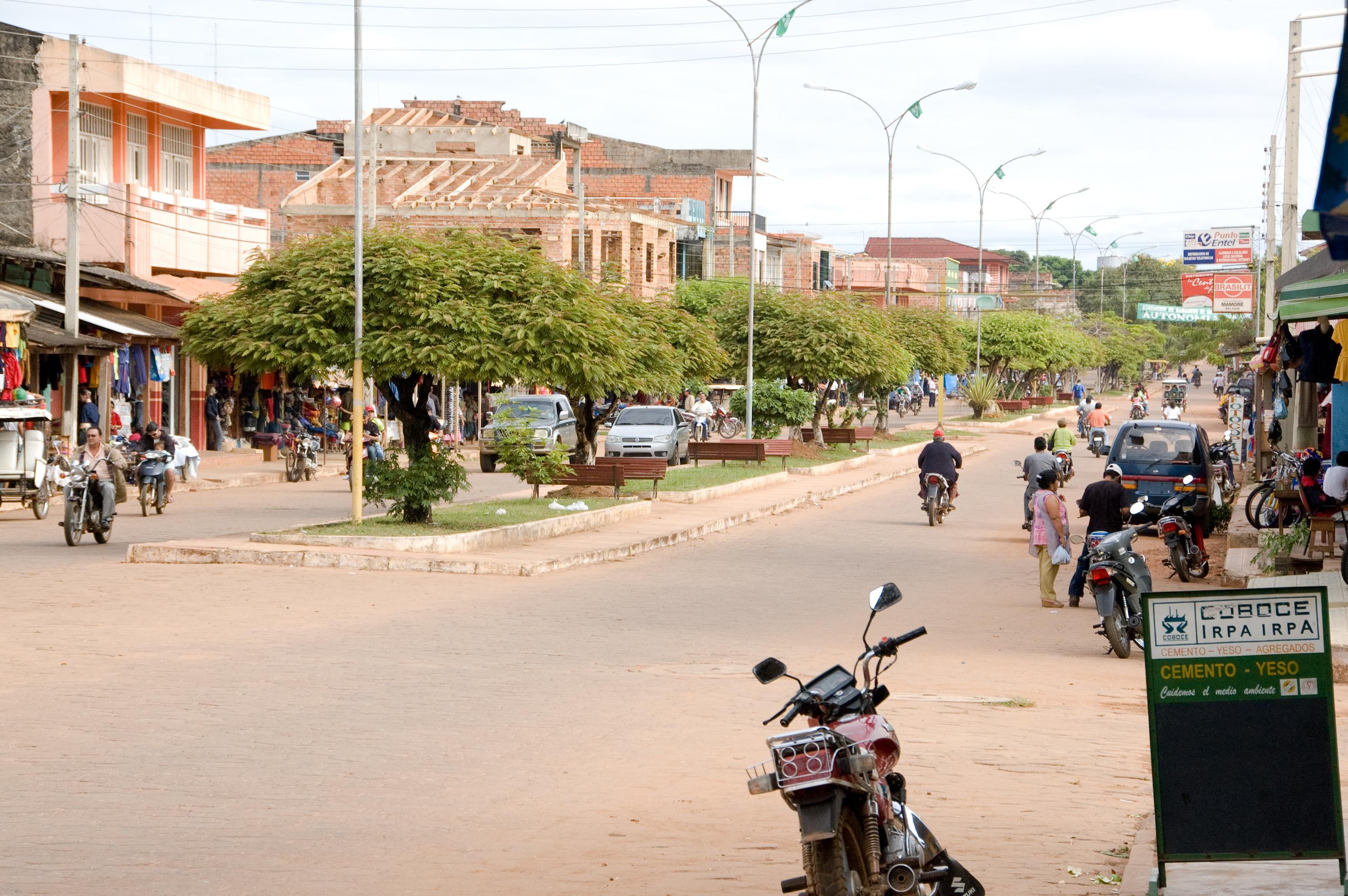

- Location of Guayaramerín town in Bolivia
- Coordinates: 10°48′S 65°23′W
- Country: Bolivia
- Department: Beni Department
- Province: Vaca Díez Province
- Municipality: Guayaramerín Municipality
- Settled: 1892

Area
  - Total: 13.9 km^{2} (5.4 sq mi)
- Elevation: 128 m (420 ft)

Population (2012)
  - Total: 39,010
  - Density: 2,810/km^{2} (7,270/sq mi)
- Time zone: UTC-4 (BOT)

Guayaramerín is a city within the Bolivian Beni Department. It is the capital of the Guayaramerín Municipality in the Vaca Díez Province. Guayaramerín is located on the west side of the Mamoré River, facing the Brazilian city of Guajará-Mirim. It is a port in which there is a permanent port of the Bolivian Navy. Guayaramerín Airport is south of the city, and served by Ecojet.

Facing the city there is the small island of Suárez, or Guajará-Mirim as it is called by the Brazilian government. The island is disputed by both countries, and treaties in 1867, 1877 and 1958 have failed to clear the matter.

== Climate ==
Climate data for Guayaramerín (Guayaramerín Airport), elevation 130 m (430 ft)
| Month | Jan | Feb | Mar | Apr | May | Jun | Jul | Aug | Sep | Oct | Nov | Dec | Year |
|---|---|---|---|---|---|---|---|---|---|---|---|---|---|
| Mean daily maximum °C (°F) | 31.9 (89.4) | 31.7 (89.1) | 32.1 (89.8) | 32.1 (89.8) | 31.6 (88.9) | 31.2 (88.2) | 31.9 (89.4) | 33.4 (92.1) | 33.8 (92.8) | 33.6 (92.5) | 32.8 (91.0) | 32.3 (90.1) | 32.4 (90.3) |
| Daily mean °C (°F) | 26.7 (80.1) | 26.6 (79.9) | 26.7 (80.1) | 26.7 (80.1) | 25.8 (78.4) | 24.9 (76.8) | 24.5 (76.1) | 25.9 (78.6) | 26.8 (80.2) | 27.4 (81.3) | 27.0 (80.6) | 26.8 (80.2) | 26.3 (79.4) |
| Mean daily minimum °C (°F) | 21.6 (70.9) | 21.6 (70.9) | 21.5 (70.7) | 21.2 (70.2) | 20.1 (68.2) | 18.6 (65.5) | 17.1 (62.8) | 18.4 (65.1) | 20.0 (68.0) | 21.2 (70.2) | 21.4 (70.5) | 21.6 (70.9) | 20.4 (68.7) |
| Average precipitation mm (inches) | 276.4 (10.88) | 256.9 (10.11) | 235.6 (9.28) | 166.6 (6.56) | 74.8 (2.94) | 26.3 (1.04) | 12.6 (0.50) | 22.6 (0.89) | 69.9 (2.75) | 143.2 (5.64) | 209.8 (8.26) | 249.1 (9.81) | 1,743.8 (68.66) |
| Average precipitation days | 17.5 | 16.1 | 15.6 | 11.4 | 6.1 | 2.6 | 1.5 | 2.4 | 4.9 | 9.6 | 12.8 | 14.9 | 115.4 |
| Average relative humidity (%) | 79.9 | 81.1 | 80.2 | 79.6 | 78.1 | 75.8 | 68.7 | 65.2 | 66.7 | 72.0 | 76.4 | 79.0 | 75.2 |
Source: Servicio Nacional de Meteorología e Hidrología de Bolivia

== Consular representation ==
Brazil has a Consulate in Guayaramerín.
