= Santa Cruz Department =

Department of Bolivia

Coordinates: 18.418°S 62.345°W

Santa Cruz Departamento de Santa Cruz (Spanish)
- Department
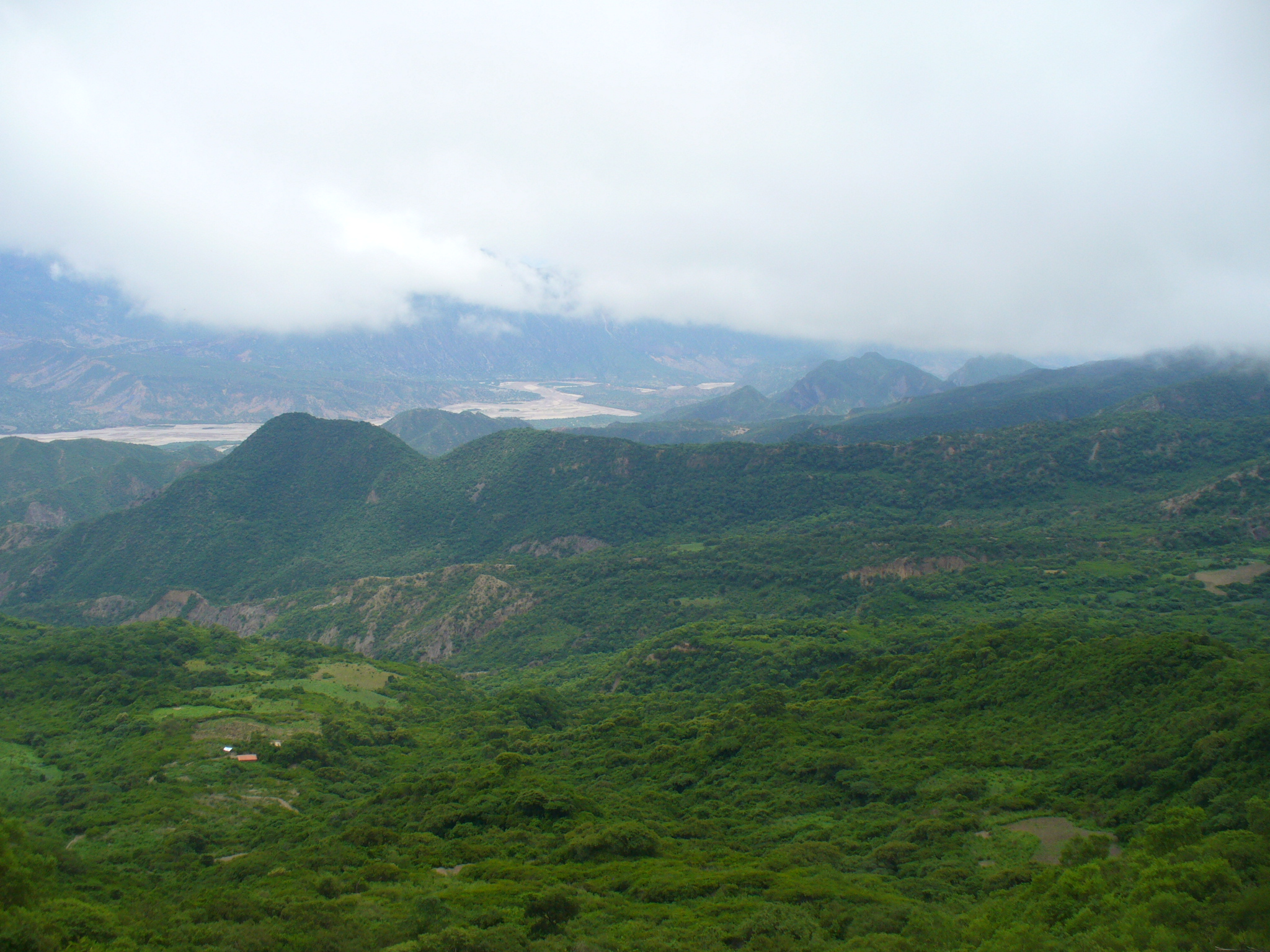
- View of the Guapay River

- Flag Coat of arms
- Motto: Siempre libres cruceños seamos. (Free Cruceños may we always be)
- Anthem: Himno a Santa Cruz
- Location within Bolivia
- Country: Bolivia
- Capital: Santa Cruz de la Sierra
- Provinces: 15
- Established as department by law: 23 July 1826

Government
  - Governor: Juan Pablo Velasco (Libre)
  - Lieutenant governor: Mario Aguilera (Creemos)
  - Senators: Centa Rek (Creemos); Henry Montero (Creemos); Isidoro Quispe (MAS); Soledad Flores (MAS)

Area
  - Total: 370,621 km^{2} (143,098 sq mi)
  - Rank: 1st in Bolivia
- 33.74% of Bolivia

Population (2024 census)
  - Total: 3,122,605
  - Rank: 1st in Bolivia
  - Density: 8.42533/km^{2} (21.8215/sq mi)
- Time zone: UTC-4 (BOT)
- Area code: +(591) 3
- Official language: Spanish, Guaraní
- ISO 3166-2: BO-S
- GDP (2023): in constant Dollar of 2015
- Total: US$ 15.5 billion Int$ 36.3 billion (PPP)
- Per capita: US$ 4,200; Int$ 9,900 (PPP)
- HDI (2019): 0.777 high · 1st of 9
- Website: www.santacruz.gob.bo

Santa Cruz (Spanish pronunciation: [ˌsanta ˈkɾus]) is the largest of the nine constituent departments of Bolivia, occupying about one-third (33.74%) of the country's territory. With an area of 370,621 km^{2} (143,098 sq mi), it is slightly smaller than Japan or the US state of Montana. It is located in the eastern part of the country, sharing borders in the north and east with Brazil and with Paraguay in the south.

In the 2024 census, it had an estimated population of 3.1 million, making it the most populated department. Its capital city is Santa Cruz de la Sierra. The department is one of the wealthiest departments in Bolivia, with huge reserves of natural gas. Besides, it has experienced the highest increase of economic growth during the last 50 years in Bolivia and South America.

== Government and administration ==
According to the current Constitution, the highest authority in the department lies with the governor. The former figure of prefect was appointed by the President of the Republic till 2005, when the prefect for the first time was elected by popular vote to serve for a five-year term. In 2010 the first governor was elected according to the implementation of autonomy after a struggle for almost a decade by the people of Santa Cruz.

Santa Cruz also has a Departmental Assembly (Asamblea Departamental), which derives but differs from the previous Departmental Council (Consejo Departamental). It is a state legislature with limited legislation powers, being able to make laws in certain subjects in exclusivity and in some others in concurrence with the state legislative branch.

== Economy ==
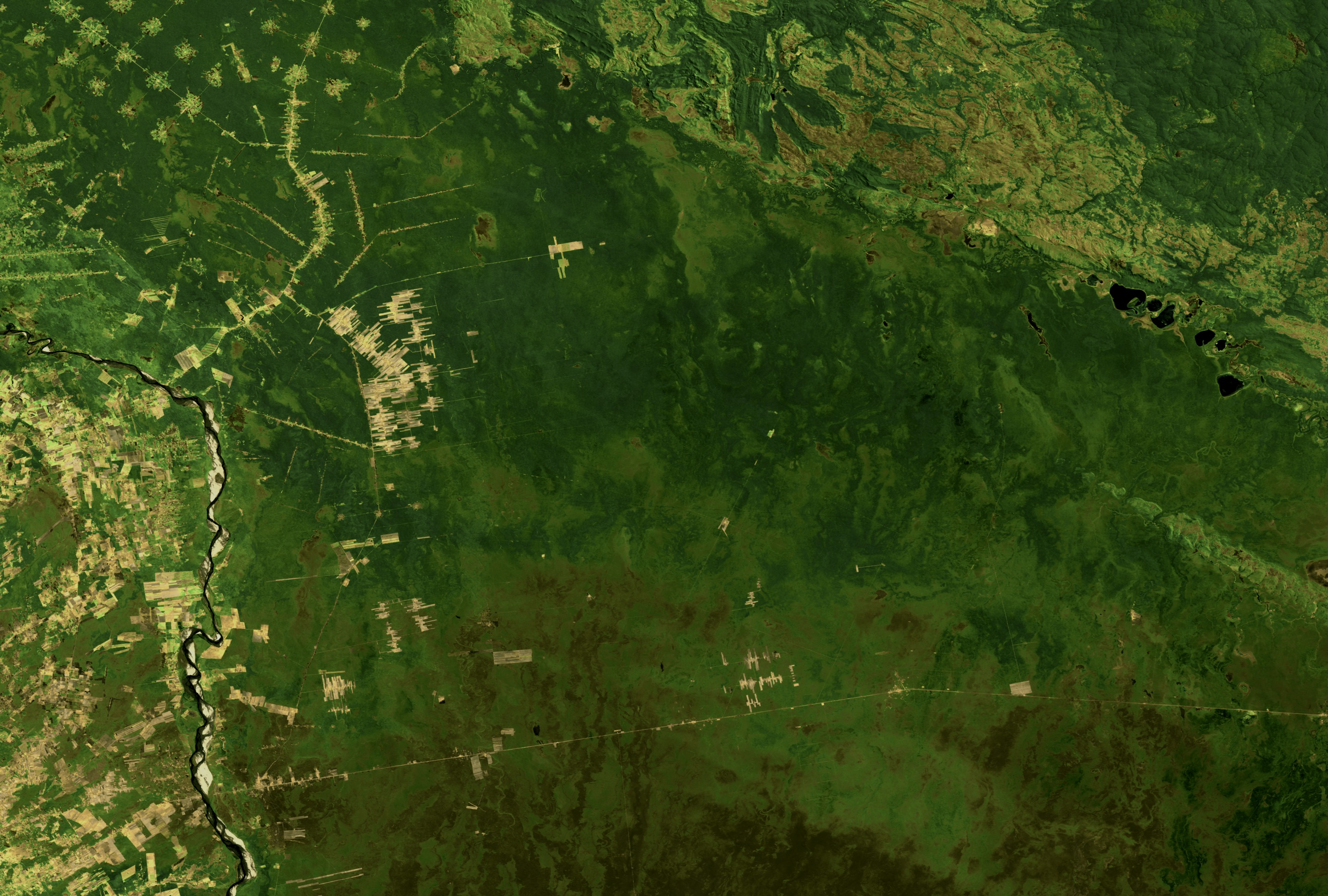
1984

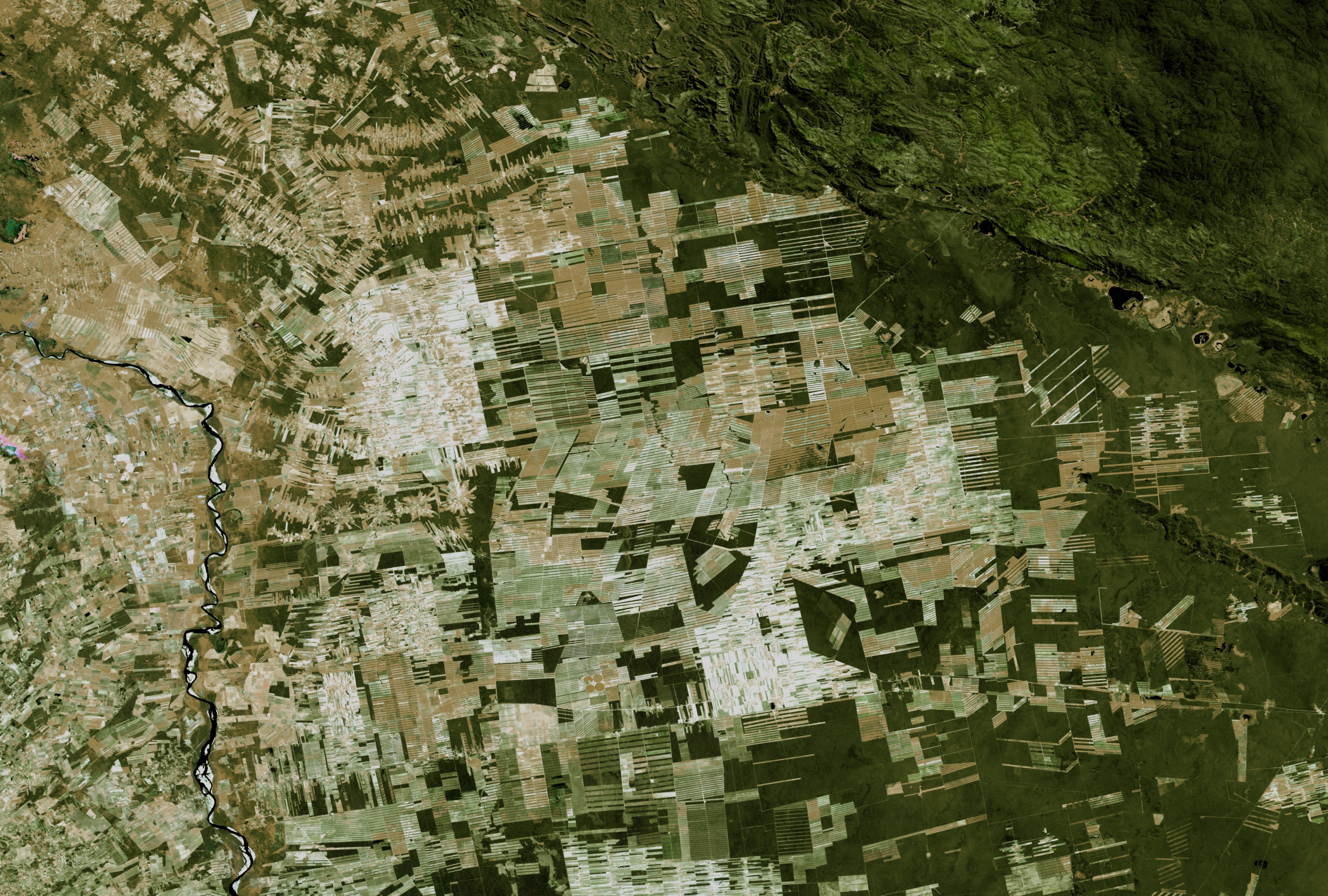
2000

Satellite images of western Chiquitos and southern Ñuflo de Chávez provinces illustrate deforestation from agrarian expansion.

The department covers a vast expanse of territory in eastern Bolivia, much of it rainforests, extending from the Andes to the border with Brazil. The department's economy depends largely on agriculture, with sugar, cotton, soybeans and rice being grown. The amount of land cultivated by modern farming techniques is increasing rapidly in the Santa Cruz area, where weather allows for two crops a year.

In recent years, the discovery of natural gas in the department has led to plans for the development of a regional natural gas industry that is likely to boost the local economy. Bolivia's energy minister said two proposed liquefied petroleum gas plants may allow the country to boost supplies to Brazil and Argentina by 2010, easing a shortage of the fuel after a lack of investment reduced output. The processing plants would be built in Santa Cruz and each would produce about 200 tons of liquefied petroleum gas a day. The plants would help turn a deficit of gas into a “surplus”.

In July 2004, the people voted in a nationwide referendum to allow for regulated exportation of the gas.

The department also hosts El Mutún, the world's second largest iron ore reserve (after Carajás in Brazil) and largest magnesium deposits are also located there. Located in the Germán Busch Province in the Santa Cruz Department of Bolivia, near Puerto Suárez, El Mutún extends across the border into Brazil, where it is called the Serrania de Jacadigo. Also known as the "Serrania Mutún", it has an area of about 75 square kilometers. Its estimated reserves are about 40.205 billion tons of iron ore of 50% iron, mainly in hematite and magnetite form, and in lesser quantities in siderite and manganese minerals. This can be compared with an estimate of the total world reserves of iron ore: 800 billion tons of crude ore containing more than 230 billion tons of iron.

== Geography ==
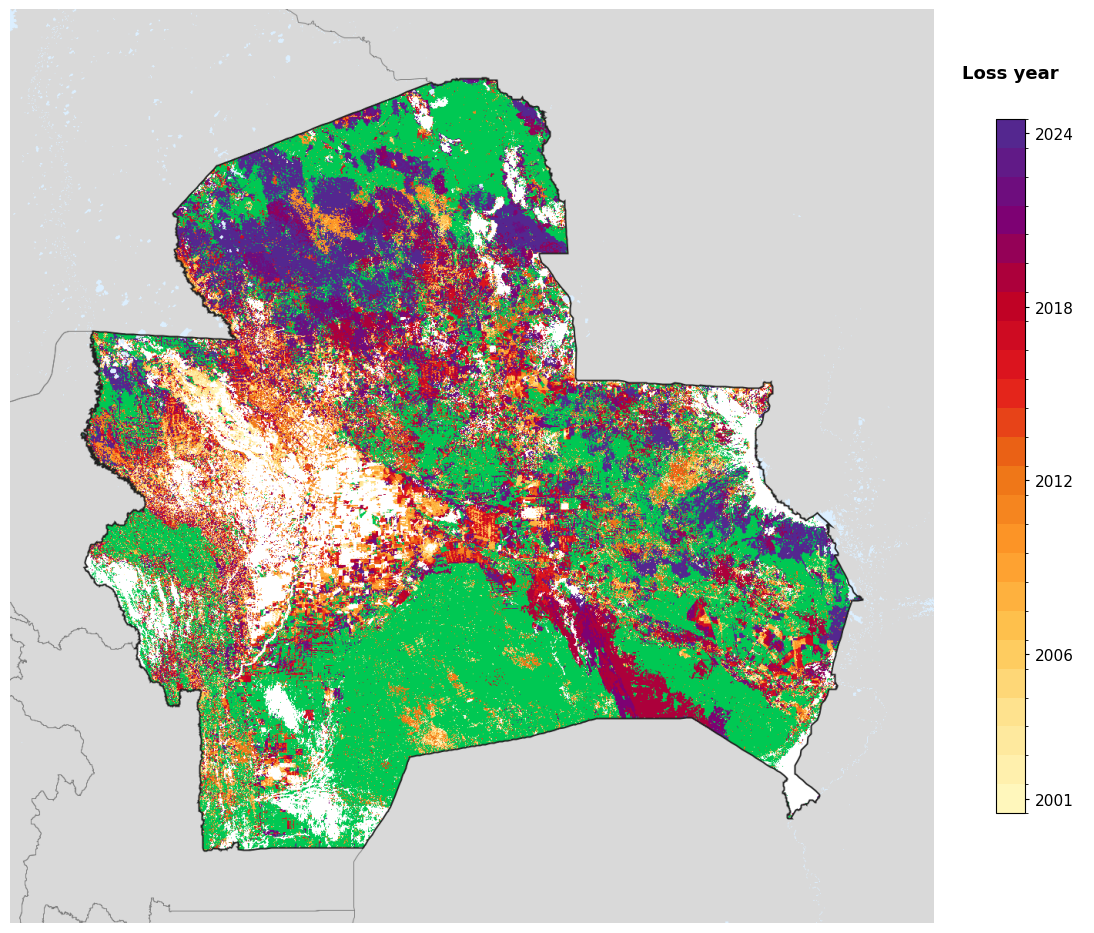
Tree-cover loss year in Santa Cruz, 2001-2024, from the Global Forest Change dataset.

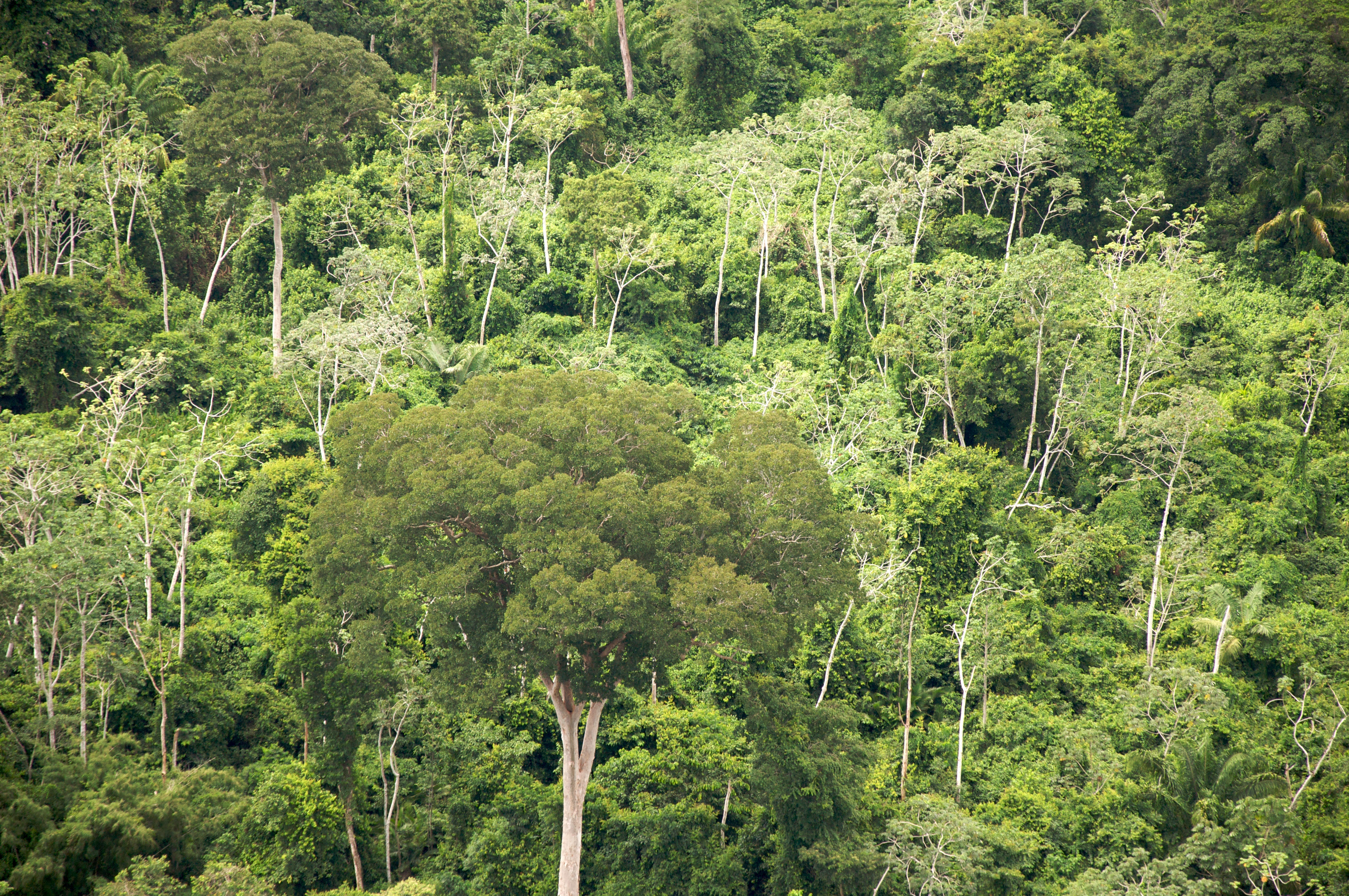
Aerial photo of forest, Santa Cruz Department, 2009.

Santa Cruz Department is the largest of the Bolivian departments and covers a wide and diverse area. In the west lies a series of temperate Sub-Andean ranges and valleys while to the north and south lies two different lowlands areas; the Beni and Chaco lowlands respectively. To the northeast lies the flat Llanos Chiquitanos areas and beyond these the Serranías Chiquitanas ranges. In the far east the departments have small parts of the huge Pantanal wetland.

=== Rivers and lakes ===
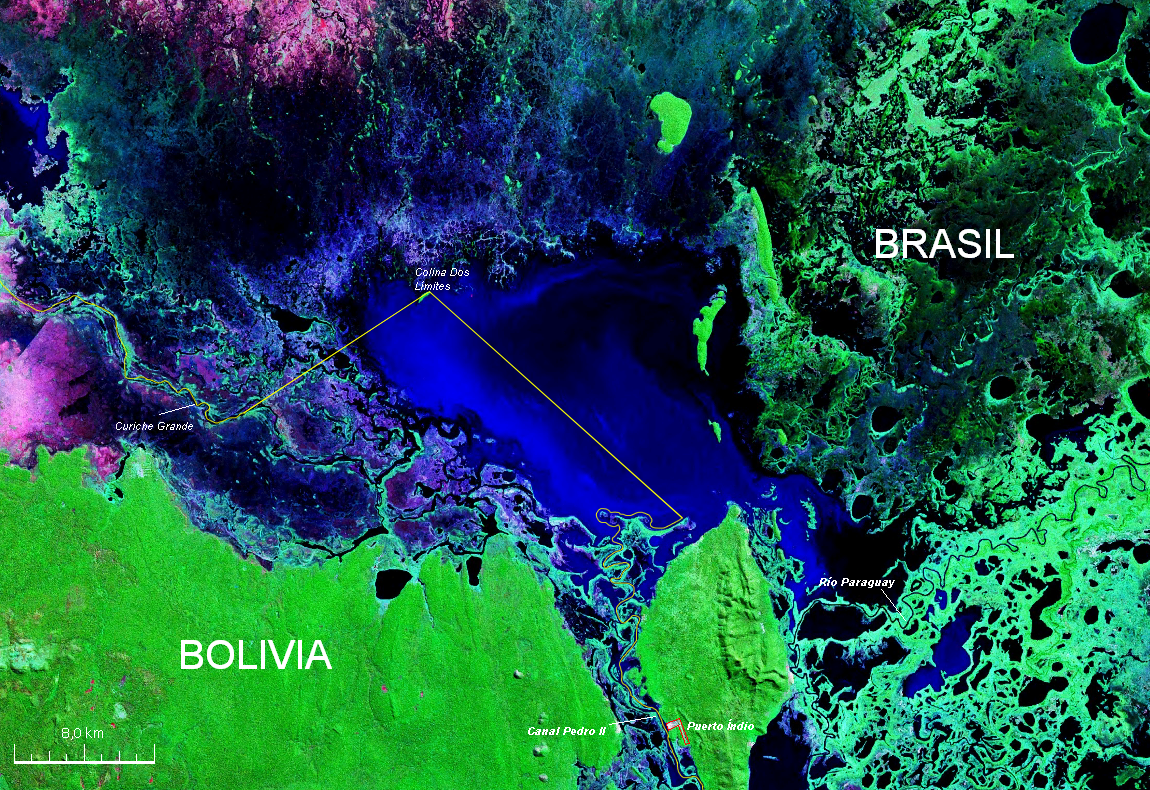
Satellite map of lake Uberaba near the Brazilian border.

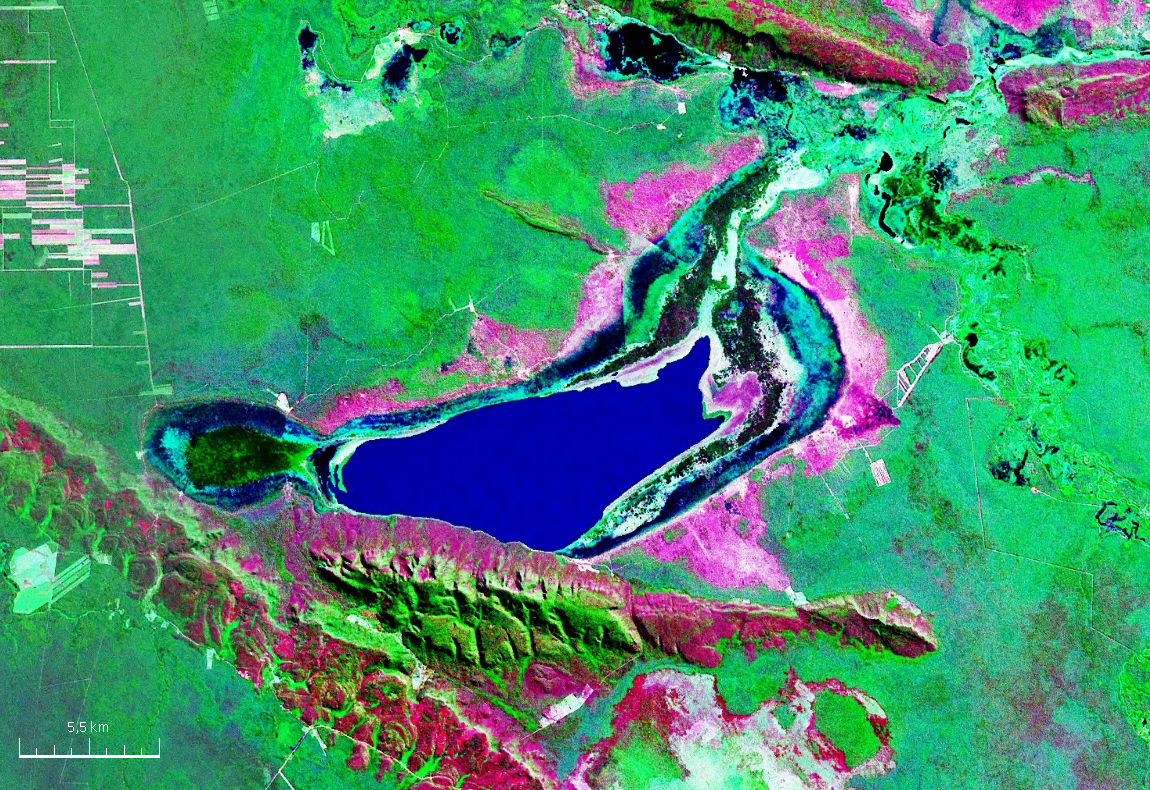
Satellite map of lake Concepción in the center of the department.

The rivers of Santa Cruz are part of any of two basins: the Amazon Basin (north) and the Plate Basin (south).

The main rivers in the northern basin are river Iténez, making the border with Brazil, Río Grande, river Piraí, and river Itonomas. In the southern basin, the main rivers are river Paraguay and its tributaries, including river Negro.

The main lakes are lake Mandioré, Uberaba, lake La Gaiba, Laguna de Marfil, Concepción, and lake San Jorge.

The rivers by length within Santa Cruz:

8 out of 48 km of the Paraguay not part of the Brazilian border.

The main lakes by their area within the department:

== Demographics ==
The first settlers of Santa Cruz were mainly Spaniards that accompanied Ñuflo de Chávez, as well as Guarani, and some Flemings, Portuguese, Germans and Italians working for the Spanish crown. Among the first settlers there were also Sephardic Jews recently converted to Christianity who were persecuted by the Inquisition in Spain. Santa Cruz has a multicultural population: 57% are Mestizos with both Indigenous Amazonian and European ascendants, 30% are Natives (Chiquitano, Chane, Ayoreo, as well as Quechua and Aymara internal migrants from other departments) and 13% are Whites of European descent, of whom about a third are the so-called "Russian" Mennonites (see Mennonites in Bolivia) of German tradition, language and descent.

Historical population
| Year | Pop. | ±% p.a. |
|---|---|---|
| 1976 | 710,724 | — |
| 1992 | 1,364,389 | +4.16% |
| 2001 | 2,029,471 | +4.51% |
| 2012 | 2,657,762 | +2.48% |
| 2024 | 3,115,386 | +1.33% |
Source: Citypopulation

== Climate ==
At 416 meters above sea level, it is warm and tropical most of the year. Winters are short and last only 2–3 months but can get very cold very suddenly. "Surazos" (southerly winds that blow in from Argentina) can drop the temperature by as much as 30 degrees overnight. This extreme cold lasts only a few days at a time and the beautiful, sub-tropical Santa Cruz is pleasant throughout most of the year. Here the climate varies by geographical zone: temperate to cold in the western sierras and warm to hot and humid as one descends into the extensive plains.

The department of Santa Cruz regularly experiences devastating forest fires, often started by landowners who want to burn forests to create new agricultural land. This practice puts a great strain on the rich biodiversity of the country.

== Provinces ==
The Department of Santa Cruz is divided into 15 provinces.

| Province | Capital | Area (km^{2}) | |
|---|---|---|---|
| Andrés Ibáñez | Santa Cruz de la Sierra | 4,821 | 1,653,001 |
| Ignacio Warnes | Warnes | 1,216 | 108,888 |
| José Miguel de Velasco | San Ignacio | 65,425 | 69,972 |
| Ichilo | Buena Vista | 14,232 | 92,721 |
| Chiquitos | San José | 31,429 | 82,429 |
| Sara | Portachuelo | 6,886 | 42,278 |
| Cordillera | Lagunillas | 86,245 | 120,111 |
| Vallegrande | Vallegrande | 6,414 | 26,576 |
| Florida | Samaipata | 4,132 | 32,842 |
| Obispo Santiesteban | Montero | 3,673 | 181,169 |
| Ñuflo de Chávez | Concepción | 54,150 | 116,545 |
| Ángel Sandoval | San Matías | 37,442 | 14,415 |
| Manuel Maria Caballero | Comarapa | 2,310 | 23,267 |
| Germán Busch | Puerto Suárez | 24,903 | 42,799 |
| Guarayos | Ascensión | 20,293 | 48,301 |

== Calls for autonomy ==
During the later stages of the Chaco war between Paraguay and Bolivia, as the Paraguayan army approached Santa Cruz department, local nationalists backed by a Paraguay-based independence movement sought to create a separate independent state in Santa Cruz department.

A referendum on autonomy was held in Santa Cruz department in 2008. Eastern departments in Bolivia, including Santa Cruz, have majority of the natural gas reserves. Bolivian president Evo Morales was planning to introduce legislation to tackle the poverty in the country using tax revenues from richer departments like Santa Cruz. Additionally, Morales's attempts to change the constitution were opposed by the opposition governors who run five of Bolivia's nine regions. 85.6% voted in favour of autonomy. The Bolivian government considered the referendum illegal.

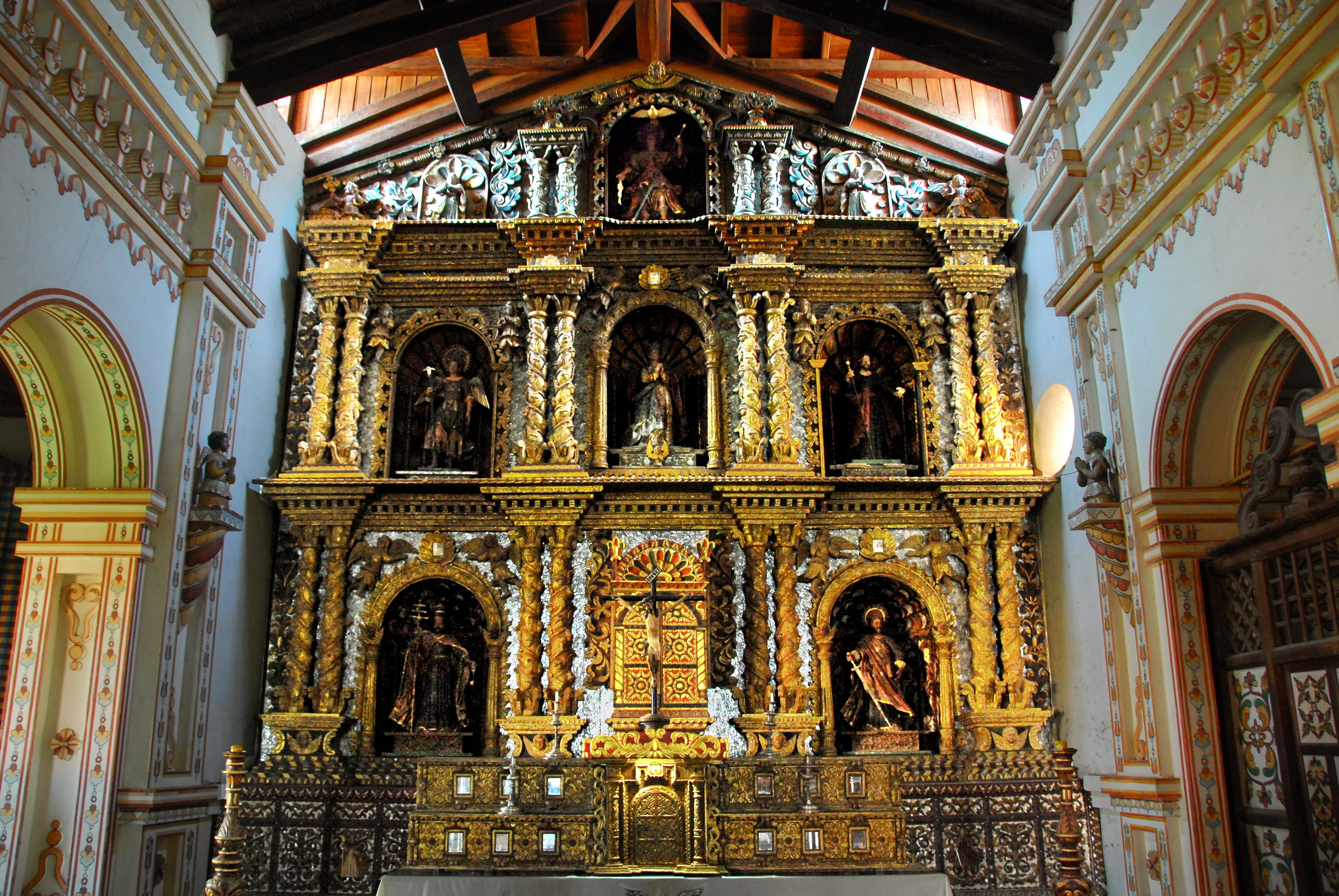
Altar in the church of San Rafael de Velasco, Santa Cruz.

== Places of interest ==
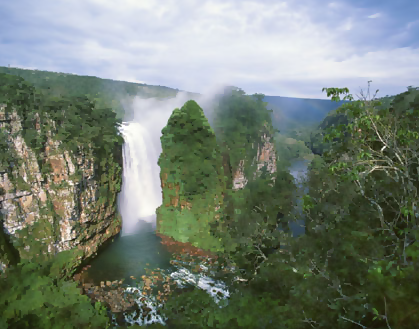
Cataratas Arcoiris Bolivia, Noel Kempff Mercado National Park

- Campanero, a portion of the population speak the Quechua language
- Kaa-Iya del Gran Chaco National Park and Integrated Management Natural Area
- Paurito
- Samaipata, Bolivia
- San José, Andrés Ibáñez
- Shrine of the Virgen de Cotoca (Patron Saint of the Department)
- Tucavaca Valley Municipal Reserve

== Villages and towns ==
- Cotoca
- El Carmen
- Guadalupe, Vallegrande
- Hardeman
- Ipitá
- Jorochito
- Limoncito
- Mora, Cordillera
- Puerto Rico, El Torno
- Pulquina
- San Ignacio del Sara
- San Pedro, Santistevan

== See also ==
- Ríos Blanco y Negro Wildlife Reserve
