= Andrés Ibáñez Province =

Andrés Ibáñez
- Province
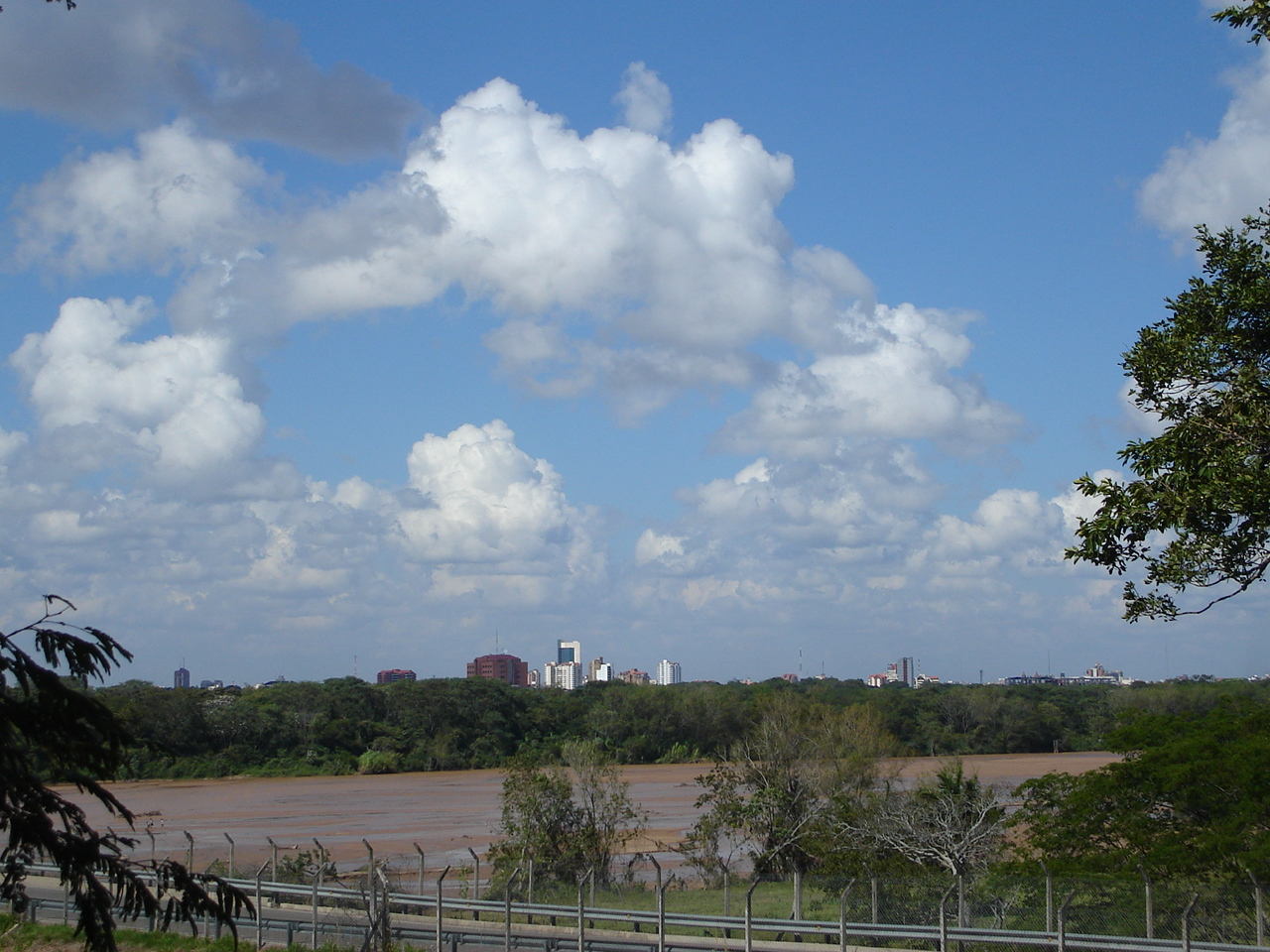
- Santa Cruz de la Sierra, situated at the Piray River

- Flag

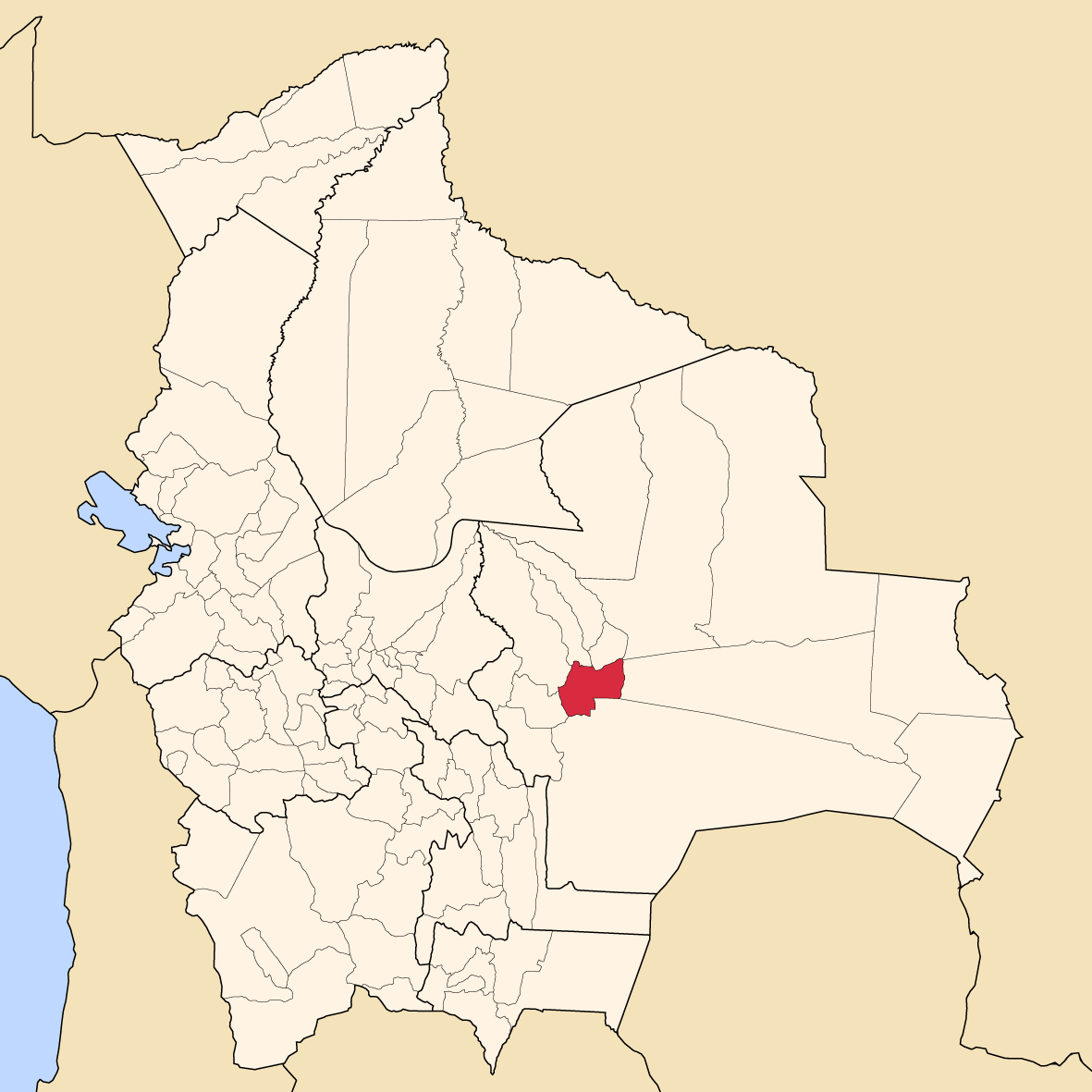
- Location of the Andrés Ibáñez Province within Bolivia

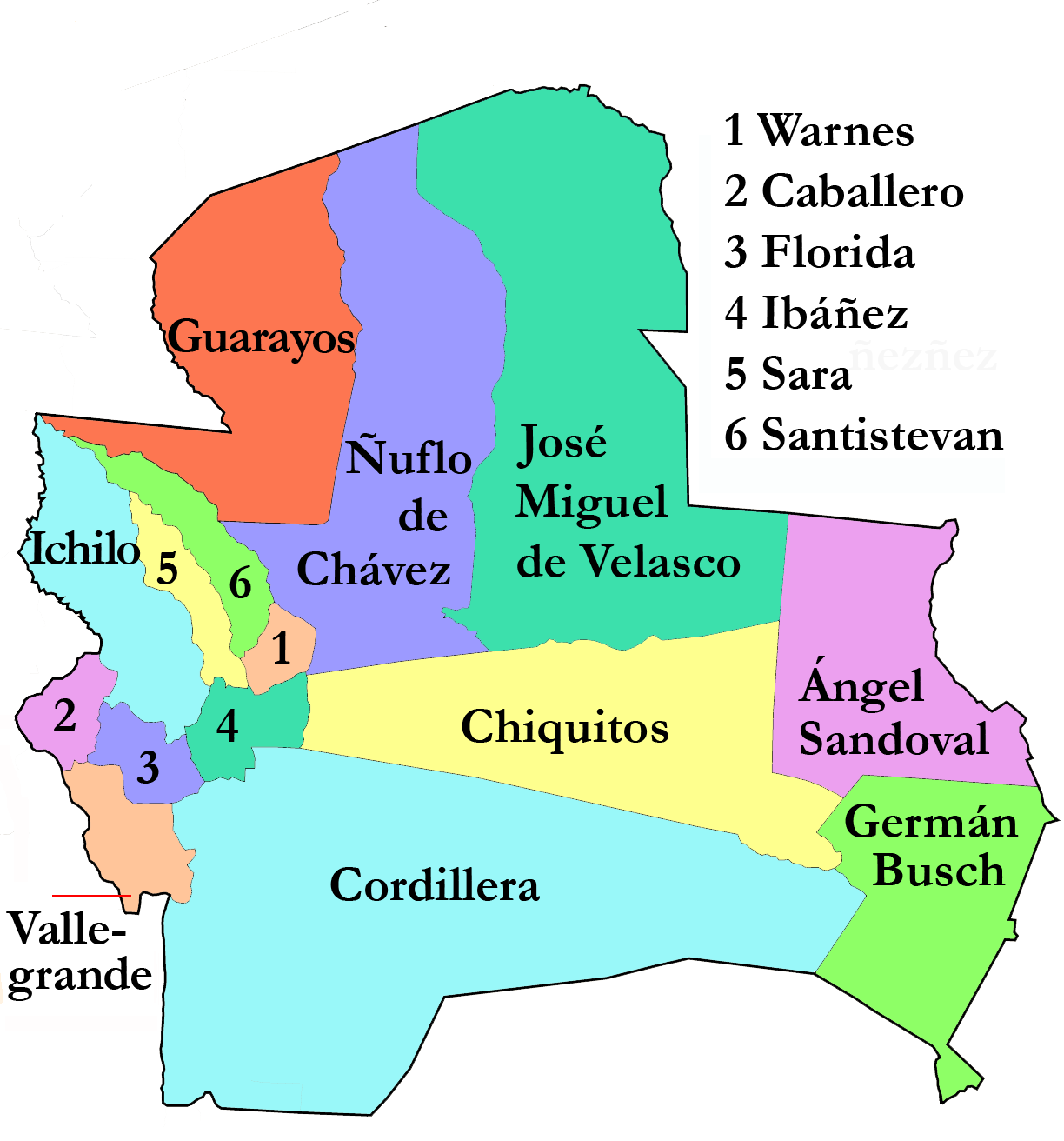
- Provinces of the Santa Cruz Department
- Coordinates: 17°50′S 63°15′W
- Country: Bolivia
- Department: Santa Cruz Department
- Municipalities: 5
- Cantons: 18
- Foundation: December 6, 1944
- Named for: Bolivian revolutionary
- Capital: Santa Cruz de la Sierra

Area
  - Total: 1,861 sq mi (4,821 km^{2})
- Elevation: 1,365 ft (416 m)

Population (2024)
  - Total: 1,939,159
  - Density: 1,042/sq mi (402.2/km^{2})
- Time zone: UTC-4 (BOT)
- Area code: BO.SC.AI
- Website: www.santacruz.gob.bo

Andrés Ibáñez Province is one of the fifteen provinces of the Bolivian Santa Cruz Department, situated in the western part of the department. Its capital is Santa Cruz de la Sierra which is also the capital of the department.

The province was created on December 6, 1944, during the presidency of Gualberto Villarroel López.

== Location ==
Andrés Ibáñez Province is located between 17° 30' and 18° 15' South and between 62° 48' and 63° 40' West. It extends over 110 km from west to east, and 90 km from north to south.

The province is situated in the Bolivian lowlands and borders Ignacio Warnes Province and Sara Province in the north, Ichilo Province in the northwest, Florida Province in the southwest, Cordillera Province in the southeast, and Chiquitos Province in the east.

== Climate ==
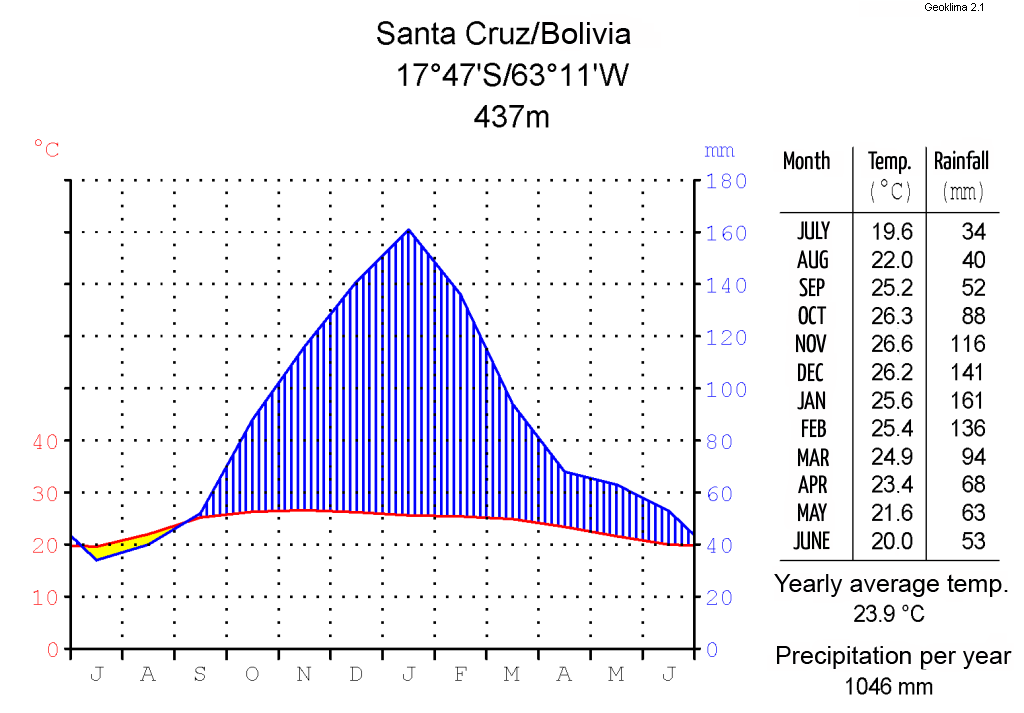

Andrés Ibáñez Province is situated in an area of a semihumid tropical climate. It is characterized by a very short dry season in the months of July and August and sufficient precipitation during the rest of the year, reaching a maximum in January.

The monthly average temperatures are a tropical 20 to 26°C, with the lowest temperatures in the dry season when nights are slightly colder because the cloud cover is broken. The yearly average temperature is 23.9°C.

== Division ==
Andrés Ibáñez Province comprises five municipalities which are further subdivided into cantons.

Section	Municipality	Inhabitants (2001)	Seat
Capital Municipality	Santa Cruz Municipality	1,135,526	Santa Cruz de la Sierra
1st	Cotoca Municipality	36,425	Cotoca
2nd	Ayacucho Municipality or Porongo Municipality	11,085	Porongo
3rd	La Guardia Municipality	39,552	La Guardia
4th	El Torno Municipality	37,961	El Torno

== Population ==
The population of Andrés Ibáñez Province has increased by circa 130% over the recent two decades:

- 1992: 784,678 inhabitants (census)
- 2001: 1,260,549 inhabitants (census)
- 2005: 1,526,187 inhabitants (est.)
- 2010: 1,841,282 inhabitants (est.)

40.1% of the population are younger than 15 years old. (1992)

99.0% of the population speak Spanish, 12.5% speak Quechua, 3.4% Aymara, and 0.8 speak Guaraní. (1992)

6.7% of the employed population work in agriculture, 1.0% in mining, 14.1% in the industrial sector, and 78.2% in general services (2001).

15.7% of the population have no access to electricity, 22.2% have no sanitary facilities. (1992)

86.1% of the population are Catholics, 9.7% are Protestants. (1992)

50% of the population is of European descent

40% of the population is Mestizo.

10% of the population is native to Bolivia
