= Río Grande (Bolivia) =

River in Bolivia

Grande River
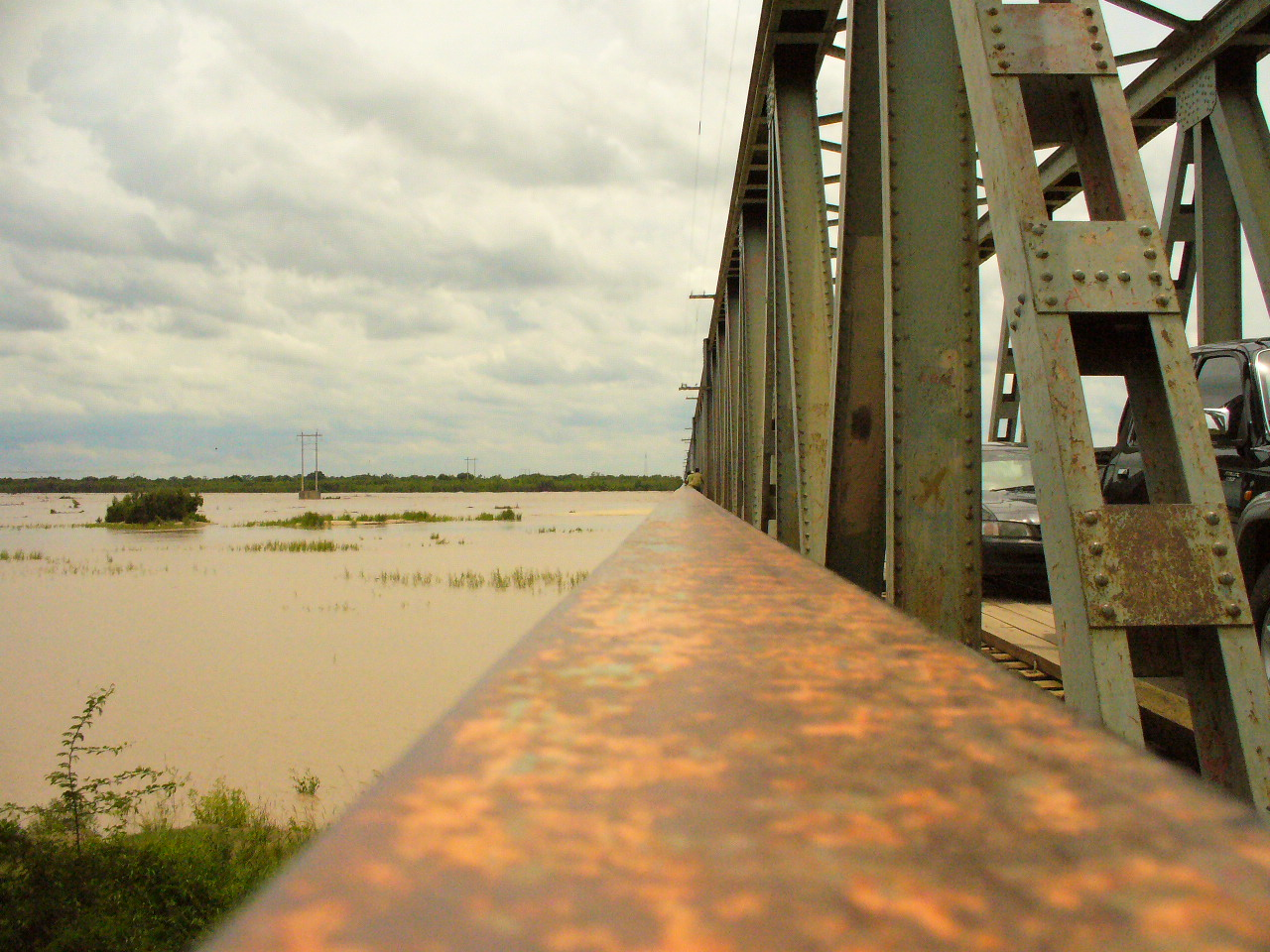
- Río Grande at Puerto Pailas

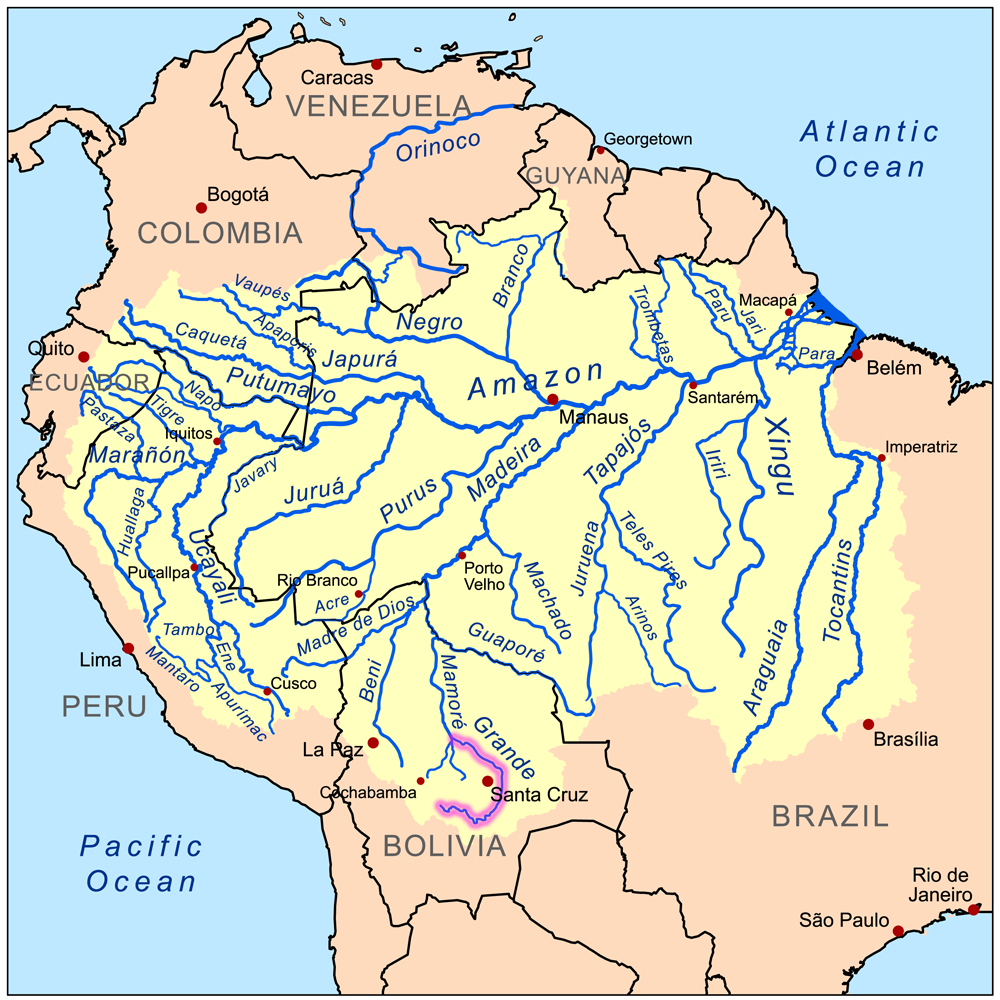
- Map of the Amazon Basin showing Río Grande (highlighted)
- Native name: Río Grande (Spanish)

Location
- Country: Bolivia

Physical characteristics
- Source: Sierra de Cochabamba
  - elevation: 3,693 m (12,116 ft)
- Mouth: Mamoré River
  - elevation: 174 m (571 ft)
- Length: 820 km (510 mi)

The Río Grande (or Río Guapay) in Bolivia rises on the southern slope of the Cochabamba mountains, east of the city Cochabamba, at 17°26′11″S 65°52′22″W. At its source, it is known as the Rocha River. It crosses the Cochabamba valley basin in a westerly direction, turning south east after 65 kilometres (40 mi) and after another 50 km (31 mi) joining the Arque River at 17°42′10″S 66°14′45″W and an elevation of 2,350 m (7,710 ft).

From this junction the river receives the name Caine River for 162 km (101 mi) and continues to flow in a south easterly direction, before it is called Río Grande. After a total of 500 km (310 mi) the river turns north east and in a wide curve flows round the lowland city of Santa Cruz.

After 1,438 km (894 mi), the Río Grande joins the Ichilo River at 15°48′09″S 64°43′47″W which is a tributary to the Mamoré.
