= Ñuflo de Chávez Province =

- Province
- Mission church in Concepción, one of the Jesuit Missions of Chiquitos (declared a World Heritage Site in 1990)

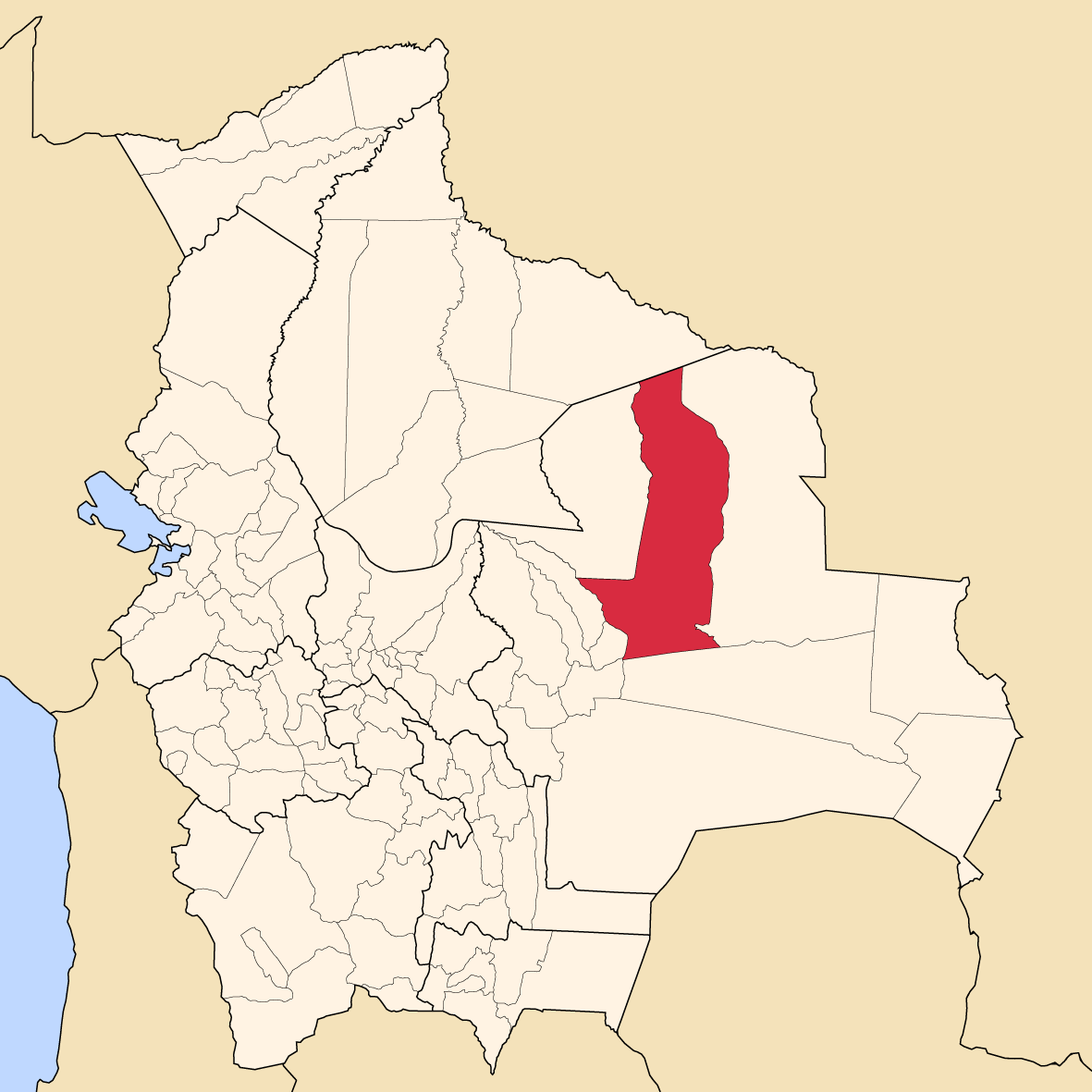
- Location of Ñuflo de Chávez Province within Bolivia

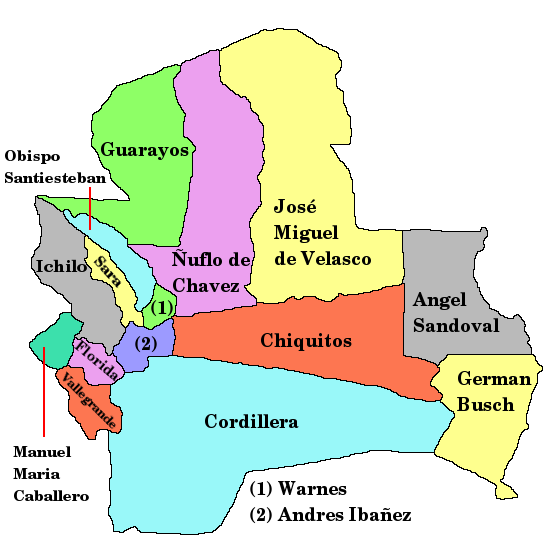
- Provinces of the Santa Cruz Department
- Coordinates: 16°00′0″S 62°00′0″W
- Country: Bolivia
- Department: Santa Cruz Department
- Capital: Concepción

Government
  - Sub governor: Widen Barbery (Concepción)

Area
  - Total: 20,910 sq mi (54,150 km^{2})
- Elevation: 1,627 ft (496 m)

Population (2024)
  - Total: 129,674
  - Density: 6.202/sq mi (2.395/km^{2})
  - Ethnicities: Chiquitos
- Time zone: UTC-4 (BOT)
- Area code: BO.SC.NC

Ñuflo de Chávez is one of the fifteen provinces of the Bolivian Santa Cruz Department and is situated in the northern and central parts of the department. The name of the province honors the conquistador Ñuflo de Chaves (1518–1556) who founded the city of Santa Cruz de la Sierra. Its capital is Concepción. The province was created by law of September 16, 1915, during the presidency of Ismael Montes. Originally it was part of the Chiquitos Province.

== Location ==
Ñuflo de Chávez Province is located between 13° 45' and 17° 30' South and between 61° 30' and 63° 25' West. It extends over a length of 520 km from north to south, and up to 250 km from west to east.

The province is situated in the Bolivian lowlands and borders Beni Department in the north, Guarayos Province in the north-west, Obispo Santistevan Province and Ignacio Warnes Province in the south-west, Andrés Ibáñez Province and Chiquitos Province in the south, and José Miguel de Velasco Province in the east.

== Division ==
The province comprises six municipalities which are further subdivided into cantons:

Section	Municipality	Inhabitants (2001)	Seat	Inhabitants (2001)
1st	Concepción Municipality	14,522	Concepción	5,586
2nd	San Javier Municipality (also San Xavier Municipality)	11,316	San Javier	5,538
3rd	San Ramón Municipality	5,660	San Ramón	4,746
4th	San Julián Municipality	56,206	San Julián	6,585
5th	San Antonio de Lomerío Municipality	6,293	San Antonio de Lomerío	1,313
6th	Cuatro Cañadas Municipality	17, 574	Cuatro Cañadas	4,571

== Demographics ==
The inhabitants of the Ñuflo de Chávez Province are mainly Chiquitos whose culture roots in the fusion of their ancient customs and the influence of the Jesuit missionaries. During the 2001 census the ethnic composition of the population was as follows:

Ethnic group	Concepción Municipality (%)	San Javier Municipality (%)	San Ramón Municipality (%)	San Julián Municipality (%)	San Antonio de Lomerío Municipality (%)	Cuatro Cañadas Municipality (%)
Quechua	4.2	3.6	13.5	49.6	1.5	36.4
Aymara	1.2	1.4	2.3	2.2	0.2	2.2
Guaraní, Chiquitos or Moxos	67.8	68.4	31.1	8.6	87.0	7.8
Not indigenous	25.1	24.7	52.5	38.1	10.7	51.3
Other indigenous groups	1.8	1.9	0.7	1.5	0.7	2.4

The population of the province has increased by more than 100% over the recent two decades:

- 1992: 61,008 inhabitants (census)
- 2001: 93,997 inhabitants (census)
- 2005: 111,813 inhabitants (est.)
- 2024: 129,674 inhabitants (census)

48.3% of the population are younger than 15 years old. (1992)

The literacy rate of the province is 94.3%. (2012)

87.3% of the population have no access to electricity, 50.4% have no sanitary facilities. (1992)

79.5% of the population are Catholics, 17.2% are Protestants. (1992)

In 1992 91.6% of the population spoke Spanish, 30.1% Quechua, 2.0% Aymara and 1.2 spoke Guaraní. During the 2001 census Spanish was spoken by 79,377 people, Quechua by 20,763, Aymara by 1,362, Guarani by 1,002, other native languages by 3,619 and foreign languages by 5,617 people. The following table shows the number of speakers per municipality:

Language	Concepción Municipality (%)	San Javier Municipality (%)	San Ramón Municipality (%)	San Julián Municipality (%)	San Antonio de Lomerío Municipality (%)	Cuatro Cañadas Municipality (%)
Quechua	363	247	468	14,855	46	4,782
Aymara	120	104	75	804	7	252
Guaraní	53	142	25	682	14	86
Another native	901	128	29	138	2.221	202
Spanish	13,370	10,414	5,278	32,182	5.480	12.637
Foreign	134	102	84	1,209	199	3,864
Only native	138	31	46	2,430	162	628
Native and Spanish	1,264	559	522	13,469	2,118	4,558
Only Spanish	12,119	9,865	4,769	19,405	3,474	11,018

The latest census in Bolivia (2024) counted 129,674 people (118,314, aged 4 and over) in the province, out of which 8,057 were German-speaking Mennonites aged 4 and over or 6.8% of the entire population.

== Economy ==
The principal economic activities are devoted to animal husbandry, dairy farming, forestry and tourism. Another important occupation is handicraft like the fabrication of hammocks, textiles, hats, bags and baskets.

== Environment ==
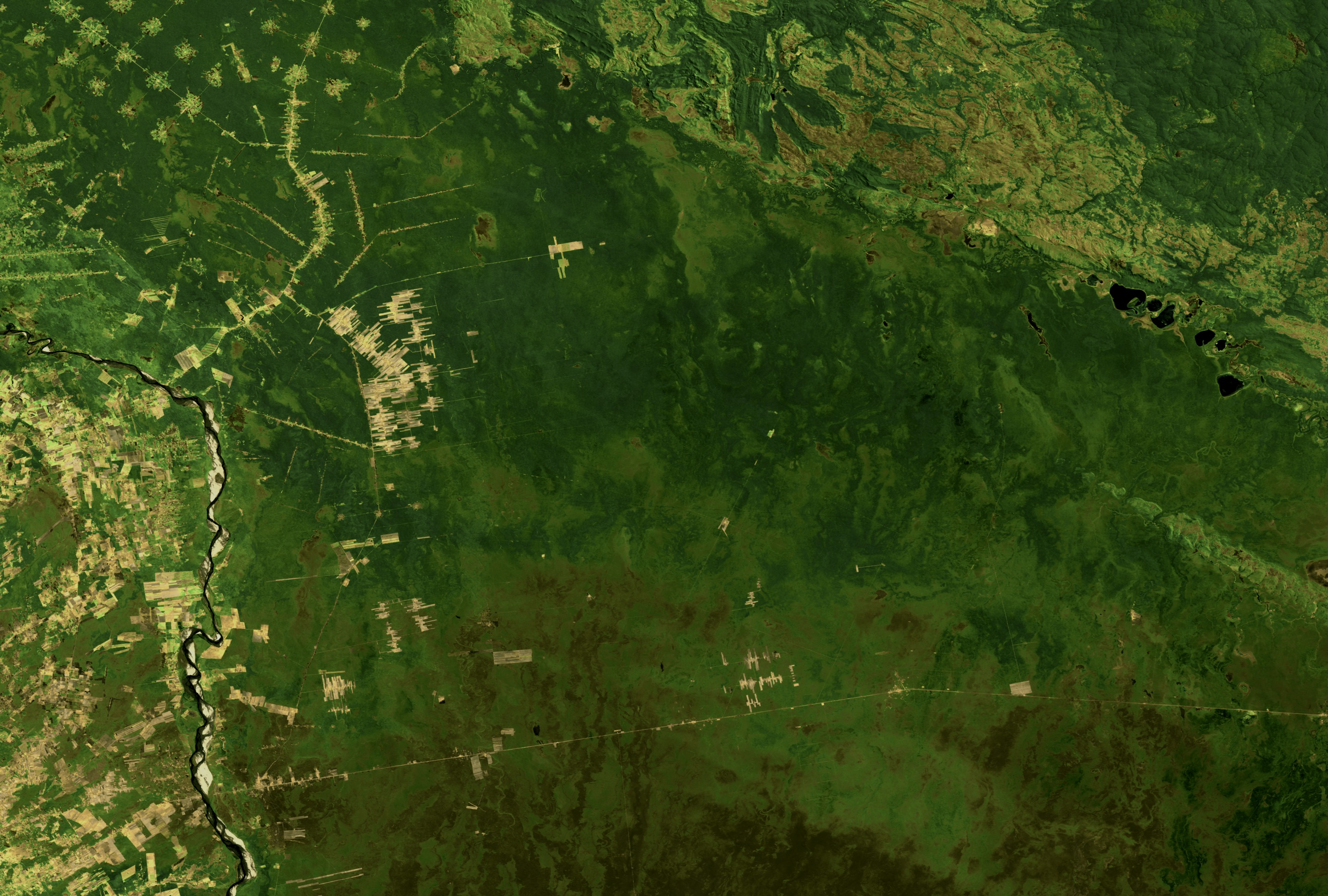
1984

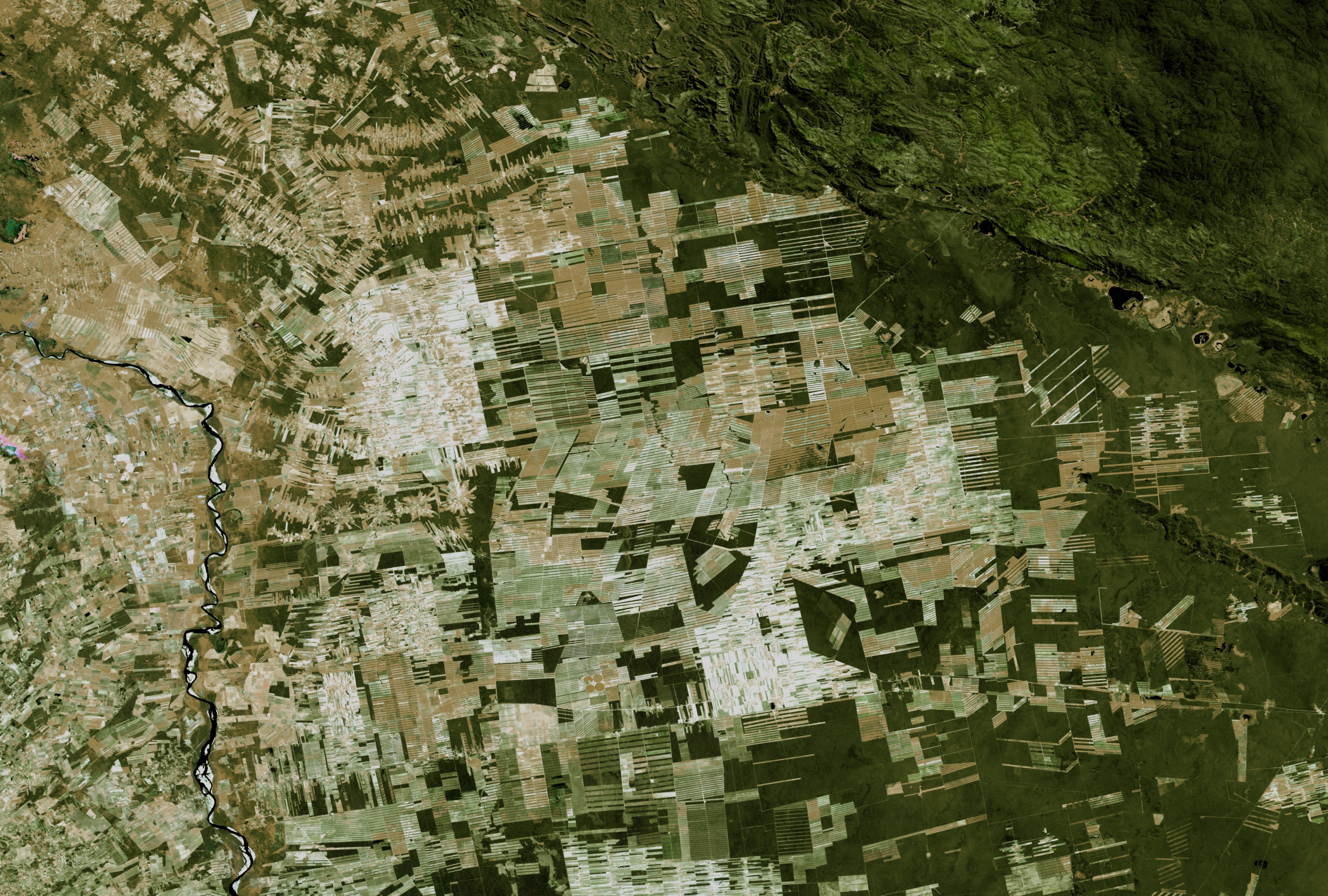
2000

Satellite images of western Chiquitos and southern Ñuflo de Chávez provinces illustrate deforestation from agrarian expansion.

Increased agricultural use of the land has led to deforestation in the area.

== Gallery ==
Concepción mission church (now the Immaculate Conception Cathedral)

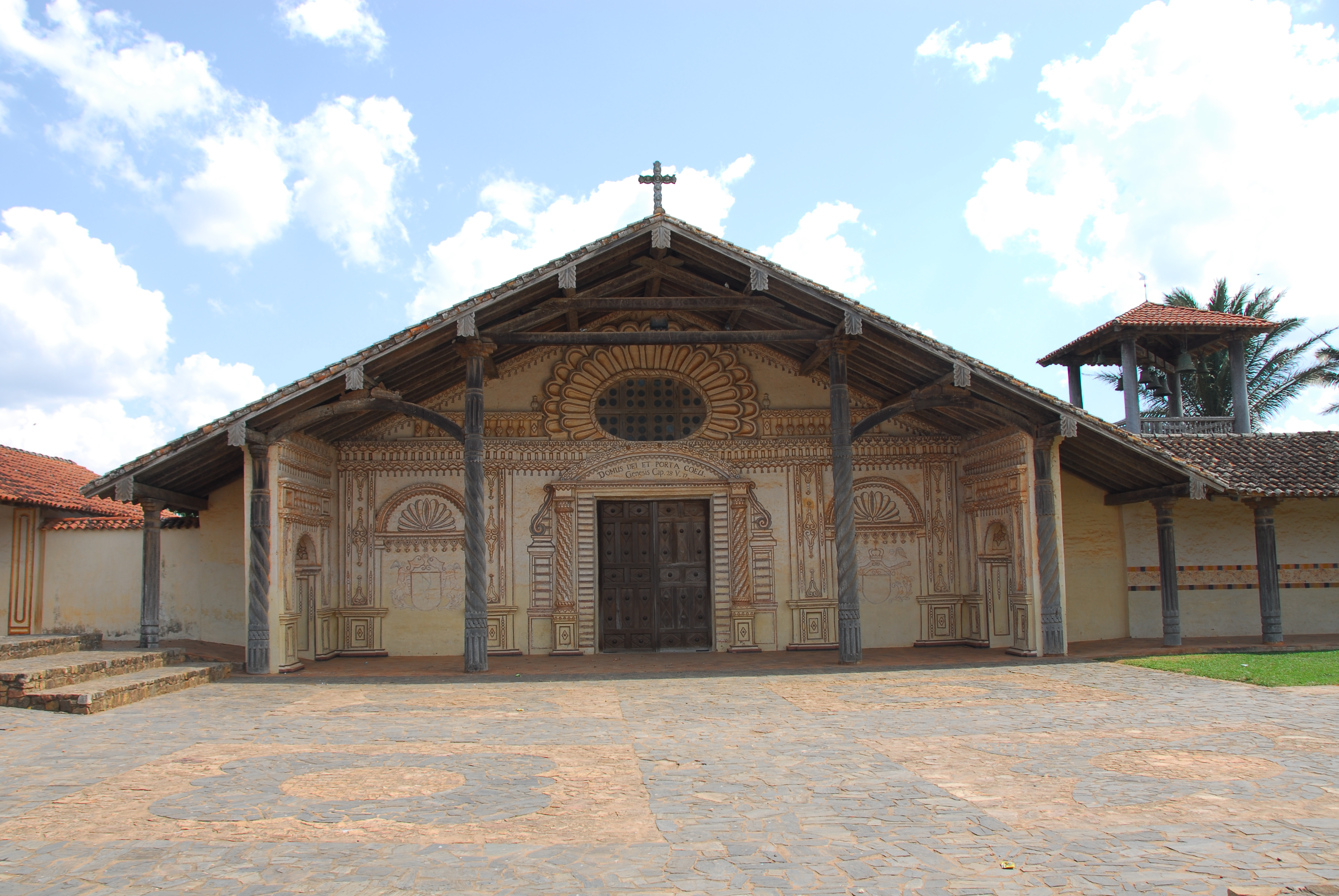
San Javier mission church

== See also ==
- Jesuit Missions of Chiquitos
