= Chané Magallanes =

- Town
- Location in Bolivia
- Coordinates: 16°57′35″S 63°13′50″W
- Country: Bolivia
- Time zone: UTC-4 (BOT)

Chané Magallanes is a small town in Bolivia. It pertains to the canton Chané Independencia, in the Municipality of Fernández Alonso, in the Province Obispo Santiestevan, in the Department of Santa Cruz. In 2012, it had an estimated population of 686.
