= Okinawa Uno Municipality =

Coordinates: 17°19′58″S 62°50′06″W

Okinawa Uno, is a municipality of Bolivia, located in Ignacio Warnes Province in Santa Cruz Department. Its shares its name with the town of Okinawa I, which lies between the Río Grande to the east and the Pailón River to the west. The municipality has a population of 10,508 inhabitants, according to the 2024 Bolivian census.

== History ==
The town of Okinawa I was established by Okinawan immigrants after the end of the Second World War, and during its peak in the mid-1960s consisted of 565 families and over 3,000 Okinawans in total.

The municipality was established on 6 April 1991, separating it from Warnes Municipality.

== Demography ==
Year	Population	Source
2001	11,661	2001 Census
2012	12,482	2012 Census
2024	10,508	2024 census

== Cantons and communities ==
Okinawa Uno is divided into two cantons at its creation: Okinawa Uno and Ignacia Zeballos, with Okinawa Uno and Nuevo Horizonte as their respective capitals. They contain the following communities.

Okinawa Uno Canton includes the communities of:

- Nueva Esperanza
- El Carmen
- El Retiro
- Puerto Perez
- Valle Chico Los Limones
- Junta Pailon
- Las Mercedes
- Okinawa 2
- Puerto Nuevo
- Rancho Chico
- Los Angeles
- Monte Verde
- Nueva Aurora
- Okinawa 1
- San Antonio
- Sumuque
- Villa Reyes

Ignacia Zeballos Canton includes the communities of:

- Nuevo Horizonte
- Virgen De Guadalupe
- Okinawa 3
- San Miguel
- San Miguel II

== See also ==
- Bolivia–Japan relations

== Sources ==
- Miyahira, Katsuyuki; Petrucci, Peter R. (2015). "Uchinaaguchi as an online symbolic resource within and across the Okinawan diaspora". In Heinrich, Patrick; Miyara, Shinsho; Shimoji, Michinori (eds.). Handbook of the Ryukyuan Languages. De Gruyter Mouton. pp. 553–573. doi:10.1515/9781614511151.553. ISBN 9781614511618.
- Suzuki, Taku (2010). Embodying Belonging: Racializing Okinawan Diaspora in Bolivia and Japan. Honolulu: University of Hawaiʻi Press. ISBN 9780824833442. JSTOR j.ctt6wqxfx.
