= Japanese Bolivians =

Japonés Boliviano 日系ボリビア人 Nikkei Boribiajin

Total population
- As of 2010: 2,828 Japanese nationals ~11,350 Bolivians of Japanese descent

Regions with significant populations
- Santa Cruz Department, La Paz, Beni Department

Languages
- Bolivian Spanish, Japanese, Okinawan

Religion
- Catholicism, Protestantism, Mahayana Buddhism, Shinto, Atheism, None

Related ethnic groups
- Japanese diaspora, Okinawan, Japanese Peruvians

Japanese Bolivians (Spanish: Japonés Boliviano; Japanese: 日系ボリビア人, Nikkei Boribiajin) are Bolivians of Japanese ancestry or Japanese-born people who reside in Bolivia.

== History ==
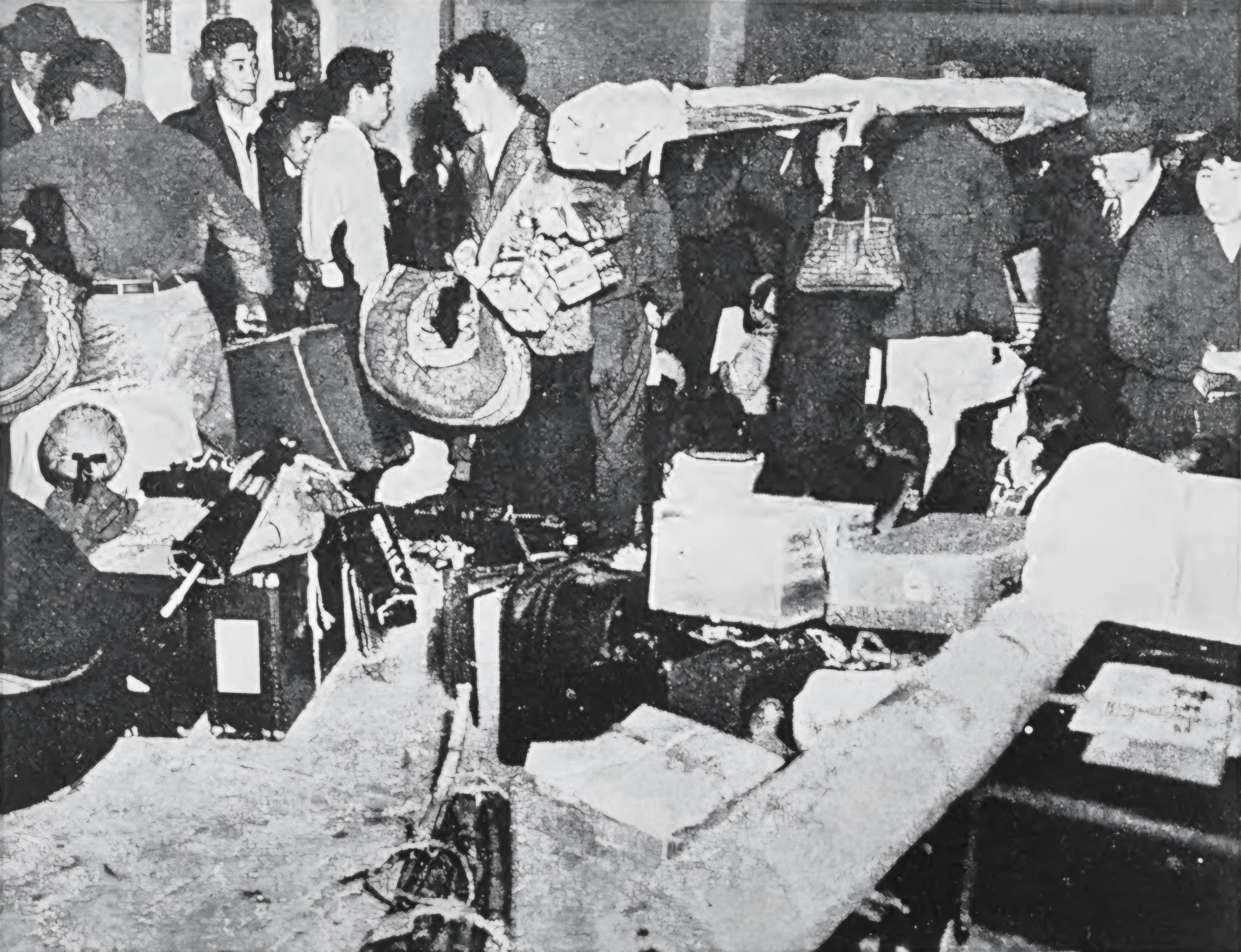
Immigration from Ryukyus to Bolivia (1956)

Since Bolivia has no coast, the first Japanese settlers came from neighboring Peru where their work contracts ended prior to the 1950s. Most Japanese settlers had origins from Okinawa, while the rest from Gifu, Hiroshima, Kanagawa and Osaka prefectures. Some of the settlers left Peru for Bolivia after epidemics of disease hit the settlers in Peru. In 1899, Mapiri River Region in La Paz experienced the first arrival of 91 Japanese workers assigned to rubber plantations. From then, the Andes Mountains continued to attract several hundred more Japanese laborers, who found work in mining and railroad construction. The inland Amazon River region emerged as the second main destination for the workers, who also came through Peru to work on rubber plantations in northwestern Bolivia. The end of World War I and the Great Depression shifted Japanese workers to the rubber and mining industries, respectively. The only places in Bolivia that survived major changes were the cities of Riberalta and La Paz, which served as the base of Japanese commercial activities. In the 1930s, most Japanese remained as settlers and many brought wives from their home country while most married local women; these created differences that divided the community.

When World War II began, only 29 Japanese Bolivians were deported to the United States. The war had little effect on the lives of residents of Japanese descent in Bolivia, since the local government did not impose any anti-Japanese measures. After the end of the war, the government warmly welcomed Japanese refugees. Treaties after 1954 guided a new chapter of Japanese Bolivian history, and led to the massive influx of agricultural settlers from U.S.-controlled Okinawa and mainland Japan. The need to relocate settlers from war-torn Japan met the Bolivian government's wish to develop the eastern lower lands in Santa Cruz Department. With the financial help of the Japanese government, Colonia Okinawa and Colonia San Juan de Yapacaní were established; the two settlements formed distinctive communities with separate identities—one Okinawan and the other mainland Japanese—that are also currently in transition from the immigrant generation to the Bolivian-born generation. While Colonia Okinawa grows soy and wheat, San Juan de Yapacaní has specialized in rice and egg production. Nowadays, many descendants have moved to the nearby city of Santa Cruz de la Sierra.

== Language ==
First-generation Japanese settlers generally use Japanese in their daily discourse, and cannot speak Spanish fluently. Subsequent generations had a decreased fluency in the Japanese language, which was attributed to the absence of Japanese-language schools in communes and speak Spanish more fluently than the first-generation settlers. Many first-generation settlers in Colonia Okinawa are still able to speak Okinawan.

== Religion ==
A study done by an Christopher Reichl and Thompson in the 1960s among the Japanese settlers at San Juan de Yapacaní noted that 32% of the Japanese were Buddhist, with an equal number who were Roman Catholics. A minority identified themselves as members of Soka Gakkai or Shinto. The majority of Japanese Catholics converted to the faith after reaching Bolivia. Conversion to Catholicism among the Japanese community increased during the 20th century, which Thompson noted was due to the absence of strong Shinto or Buddhist religious institutions which the settlers could practice their faith. Among the non-Christian Japanese, some first and second-generation settlers maintained household Shinto shrines, although the sizeable majority became agnostic in religious outlook.

== Education ==
The Curso Suplementario del Idioma Japones is a supplementary Japanese education program in La Paz.

== Notable people ==
- Adalberto Kuajara Arandia – politician
- Tito Kuramotto Medina – painter and sculptor
- Michiaki Nagatani Morishita – presidential candidate
- Pedro Shimose – essayist, professor and poet
- Armando Yoshida – ambassador to Japan, former Chancellor of Bolivia
- Natasha Allegri – writer, comic book artist, storyboard revisionist for Cartoon Network's Adventure Time

== See also ==
- Bolivia–Japan relations
- Japanese diaspora
- Immigration to Bolivia

== Bibliography ==
- Amemiya, Kozy (2001). “The Importance of Being Japanese in Bolivia.” (Japan Policy Research Institute, Working Paper No. 75). (Archive)
- Boribia Nihonjin 100 Shūnenshi Hensan Iinkai [ボリビア日本人100周年誌編纂委員会] (2000). "Boribia ni ikiru: Nihonjin ijū 100 shūnenshi [ボリビアに生きる. 日本人移住100周年誌]". Santa Kurusu [サンタクルス]: Boribia Nikkei Kyōkai Rengōkai [ボリビア日系協会連合会].
- Kikumura-Yano, Akemi (2002). Encyclopedia of Japanese Descendants in the Americas: An Illustrated History of the Nikkei, Rowman Altamira, ISBN 0-7591-0149-3
- Kunimoto, Iyo (1990). "Un pueblo japonés en la Bolivia tropical: San Juan de Yapacaní en el Departamento de Santa Cruz." Santa Cruz: Editorial Casa de la Cultura "Raúl Otero Reiche".
- Masterson, Daniel M. and Sayaka Funada-Classen. (2004), The Japanese in Latin America: The Asian American Experience. Urbana, Illinois: University of Illinois Press. ISBN 978-0-252-07144-7; OCLC 253466232
- Mitre, Antonio (2006). "Náufragos en tierra firme. Bloqueo comercial, despojo y confinamiento de japoneses de Bolivia durante la Segunda Guerra Mundial." Santa Cruz de la Sierra: El País.
- Parejas Moreno, Alcides (1981). "Colonias Japonesas en Bolivia." La Paz: Talleres de Artes Gráficas del Colegio "Don Bosco".
- Siemann, Yvonne (2012). "Descendientes de japoneses en Santa Cruz."In: Villar, Diego and Isabelle Combès: "Las tierras bajas de Bolivia: miradas históricas y antropológicas." Santa Cruz de la Sierra: El País.
- Suzuki, Taku (2010). "Embodying Belonging: Racializing Okinawan Diaspora in Bolivia and Japan", University of Hawai'i Press.
- Wakatsuki, Yasuo and Iyo Kunimoto (eds.) (1985). "La Inmigración japonesa en Bolivia. Estudios históricos y socioeconómicos." Tokio: Universidad de Chuo.
