= Yapacaní River =

River in the Amazon Basin, Bolivia

Location
- Country: Bolivia

Physical characteristics
- Source
  - location: Santa Cruz Department
  - elevation: 292 m (958 ft)
- Length: 335 km (208 mi)
- Basin size: Amazon Basin

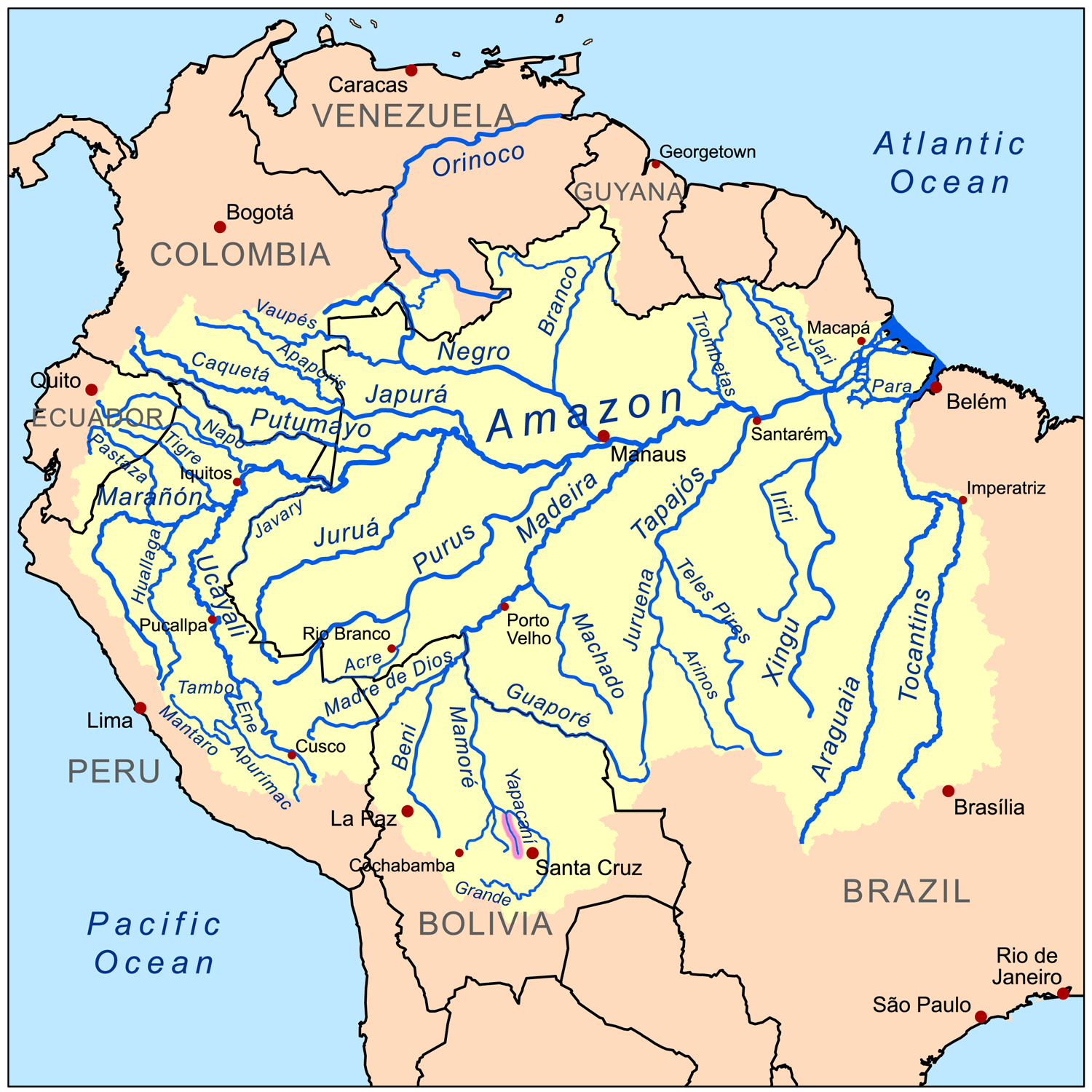
The Yapacaní River shown as a tributary of the Mamoré River

The Yapacaní River is a river of Bolivia, part of the Amazon River basin. The 335 kilometres (208 mi) river is a tributary of the Rio Grande. The river runs northwards through the Santa Cruz Department and joins the Mamoré River.

== Geography ==
The Yapacaní River originates in the formations of the Amboró National Park and receives water from numerous rivers and tributary streams. It arises from the confluence of the Yapacaní and Surutú at 17°24′35″S 63°50′33″W. From this point, the river flows northwest to its mouth in the Rio Grande at 15°58′25″S 64°31′00″W.

The river forms the border between the municipalities of San Juan and Yapacaní, in Ichilo Province of the Santa Cruz Department. Today, the town of La Chancadora, which is located upstream, is threatened by the continuous flooding of the river, since it can be up to 2,600 ft (800m) wide in places. In 2005 work began on the river channeling the Yapacaní-Surutú. The Piray River is a major tributary.

== Economy ==
The river Yapacaní has economic significance because of the potential marketable fishing of some species that occur in its waters.

The banks of the river have been cleared for agriculture, which has been denounced by some environmental advocacy organizations. Colonization efforts began in Santa Cruz Department in 1954. In 1958, the trail from the Yapacaní River to the Ichilo River was widened with the hope of attracting more agricultural colonists. In 1963, the road west from Montero stopped at the river. Previous efforts to construct a bridge over the river were failures, and the only way to cross it continued to be by boat. Since the river was often high, crossings could be delayed three to four days. In 1966, work began on construction of a bridge which would eliminate river crossings by boat.

== See also ==
- List of rivers of Bolivia

== Sources ==
- Lougheed, Vivian (2007). Bolivia Pocket Adventures. Hunter Publishing. ISBN 978-1-5884-3565-1.
- Schmink, Marianne; Wood, Charles H. (1984). Frontier Expansion in Amazonia. University Press of Florida. ISBN 978-0-8130-0785-4.
