= Yapacaní =

Yapacaní Villa Yapacaní
- Town
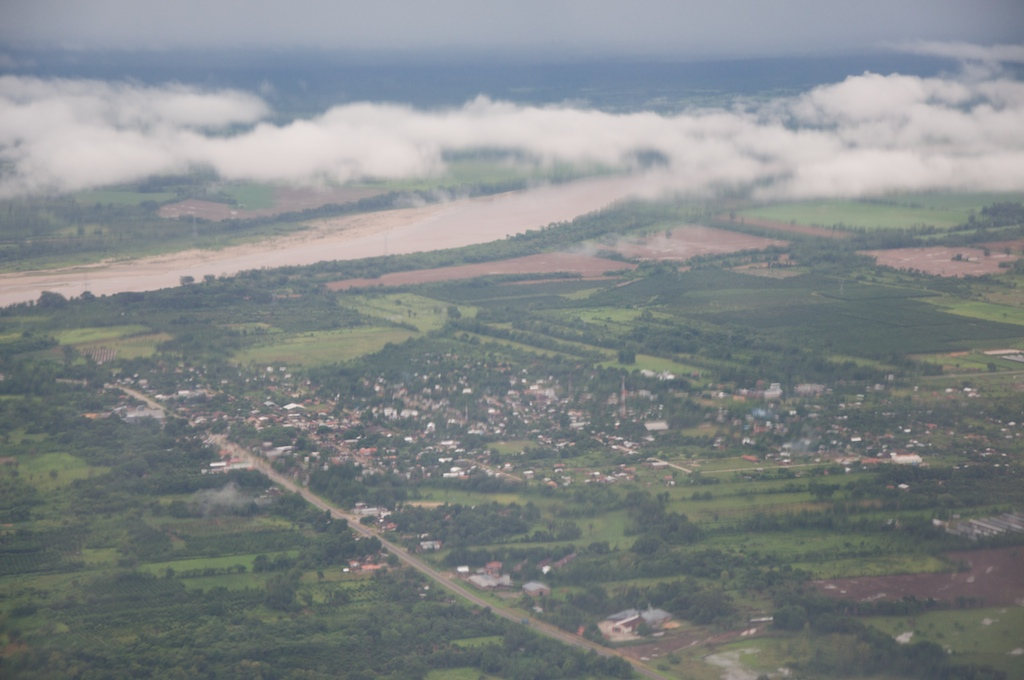

- Location within Bolivia
- Coordinates: 17°24′10″S 63°53′06″W
- Country: Bolivia
- Department: Santa Cruz Department
- Province: Ichilo
- Founded: August 23, 1953
- Elevation: 296 m (971 ft)

Population (2012)
  - Total: 26,270
- Time zone: UTC-4 (BOT)
- Climate: Am

Yapacaní (or Villa Yapacaní) is the largest city in the province of Ichilo in the Bolivian department of Santa Cruz. It lies on the west bank of the Yapacani River, at the mouth of the Surutú River, 100 km north-west of Santa Cruz de la Sierra, the largest city in Bolivia. It is the centre of the district of Yapacaní Municipio. Prior to its foundation on 23 August 1953, there was a military post called El Comando.

In 1963, the road west from Montero stopped at the Yapacaní River. Previous efforts at bridge building were unsuccessful and the only way to get to Villa Busch, the administrative camp for the colony, was by boat. If the river was running high, it was necessary to delay crossing up to three or four days. The trip from Villa Busch to the colony was best made by foot as vehicles became bogged down and could not cross log foot bridges.

In the last two decades the town's population has risen from 8,585 inhabitants (census 1992), to 14,665 (census 2001), to 26,270 inhabitants (2012 estimate).

== Geography ==
Yapacaní is located in the wettest region of the Santa Cruz department, situated on the border between the tropical montane rainforests of Amboró and Carrasco, the Amazon rainforests of the Chapare region, and the monsoonal llanos of western Santa Cruz and southwestern Beni. While Yapacaní experiences a short dry season, rain is plentiful year round, and temperatures are generally warm to hot. The area has a tropical monsoon climate according to the Köppen Classification System, bordering on a tropical rainforest climate.

Climate data for Yapacaní
Month	Jan	Feb	Mar	Apr	May	Jun	Jul	Aug	Sep	Oct	Nov	Dec	Year
Record high °C (°F)	38.1 (100.6)	37.8 (100.0)	39.3 (102.7)	38.0 (100.4)	34.0 (93.2)	32.2 (90.0)	32.0 (89.6)	35.0 (95.0)	36.4 (97.5)	38.4 (101.1)	40.3 (104.5)	38.4 (101.1)	40.3 (104.5)
Mean daily maximum °C (°F)	30.2 (86.4)	30.5 (86.9)	29.5 (85.1)	27.7 (81.9)	24.9 (76.8)	23.1 (73.6)	23.9 (75.0)	27.7 (81.9)	29.4 (84.9)	29.8 (85.6)	30.7 (87.3)	31.4 (88.5)	28.2 (82.8)
Daily mean °C (°F)	26.8 (80.2)	26.6 (79.9)	26.2 (79.2)	24.7 (76.5)	22.8 (73.0)	20.4 (68.7)	21.1 (70.0)	23.0 (73.4)	25.2 (77.4)	26.4 (79.5)	27.1 (80.8)	27.0 (80.6)	24.8 (76.6)
Mean daily minimum °C (°F)	21.3 (70.3)	21.3 (70.3)	20.5 (68.9)	18.9 (66.0)	16.5 (61.7)	15.4 (59.7)	14.8 (58.6)	16.3 (61.3)	18.7 (65.7)	19.8 (67.6)	20.3 (68.5)	20.9 (69.6)	18.7 (65.7)
Record low °C (°F)	20.4 (68.7)	19.0 (66.2)	19.0 (66.2)	17.5 (63.5)	15.0 (59.0)	11.0 (51.8)	10.0 (50.0)	14.4 (57.9)	16.7 (62.1)	18.0 (64.4)	18.3 (64.9)	19.0 (66.2)	10.0 (50.0)
Average precipitation mm (inches)	444.4 (17.50)	467.5 (18.41)	242.1 (9.53)	242.8 (9.56)	129.0 (5.08)	116.7 (4.59)	55.6 (2.19)	59.0 (2.32)	158.2 (6.23)	193.0 (7.60)	244.3 (9.62)	368.2 (14.50)	2,720.7 (107.11)
Average precipitation days (≥ 1.0 mm)	14.0	11.1	12.7	9.4	11.4	3.4	1.0	4.0	5.6	7.4	9.4	11.9	111.6
Average relative humidity (%)	79	79	79	78	79	78	73	65	64	67	72	77	74
Source: SENAMHI

== Transportation ==
The town has a four lane road through its center, which was re-surfaced and stop lights were installed in 2010. Transportation in Yapacani is dominated by motorcycles, truffies, and micro-buses. Motorcycle taxis operate the streets of the town allowing one to arrive from one place to another for about 2 Bolivianos. Travel between towns is usually done in truffies which are cars operated by collectives. A trip to Santa Cruz is 20 Bolivianos, to Montero 10 Bolivianos, Santa Fe 2 Bolivianos, San Juan de Yapacani 4 Bolivianos, and Bulo Bulo 11 Bolivianos. One bus leaves from Yapacani direct to Cochabamba.

== Economy ==
The small villages surrounding Yapacani produce rice, cane sugar, mandarin oranges, and other products. Rice is by far the largest crop produced and provides income to many small communities that lie to the north of town. These communities are accessed by a road called "Faja Norte" where a two Boliviano fee is charged to enter. This road makes a loop from Yapacani north-west later re-joining the main Santa Cruz-Cochabamba road near the community of Ichilo. The road is almost entirely gravel and sometimes becomes difficult to navigate in the rainy season. The towns along the Faja Norte that produce rice from nearest to farthest from Yapacani are: Km 7, Villa Imperial (Km 23), El Comandito (Km 35), Km 48, Challavito, and Cascabel. A natural gas compound exists at the north end of the loop where there are two communities called Los Pozos and Patajusal.

== Natural events ==
The town is located on a zone of land between the Andean plateau and the Brazilian shield. It is normally not seismically active but has a potential for earthquakes. The most recent seismic activity in the area occurred on the morning of January 23, 2010 when an earthquake of magnitude 5.3 occurred 10 miles southeast of the town. No injuries or damage were recorded in the town center.

== Sources ==
- Schmink, Marianne; Wood, Charles H. (1984). Frontier Expansion in Amazonia. University Press of Florida. ISBN 978-0-8130-0785-4.
