= San Ramón Municipality =

San Ramón Municipality may refer to:

- San Ramón Municipality, Beni, in Beni Department, Bolivia
- San Ramón Municipality (Santa Cruz), in Santa Cruz Department, Bolivia
- San Ramón, Matagalpa, El Salvador
- San Ramón, Cuscatlán, Nicaragua
