= Chane Independencia =

Coordinates: 16.9661°S 63.2214°W

- Town
- Interactive map of Chane Independencia
- Country: Bolivia
- Time zone: UTC-4 (BOT)

Chane Independencia is a village and a former canton in the municipality of Puerto Fernández Alonso in the province of Obispo Santistevan in the department of Santa Cruz in Bolivia. In 2010 it had an estimated population of 3,527. It comprises the communities of Chané Magallanes, San Marcos, San Lorenzo, Las Parabas, Las Pozas, El Torno and Aguai.
