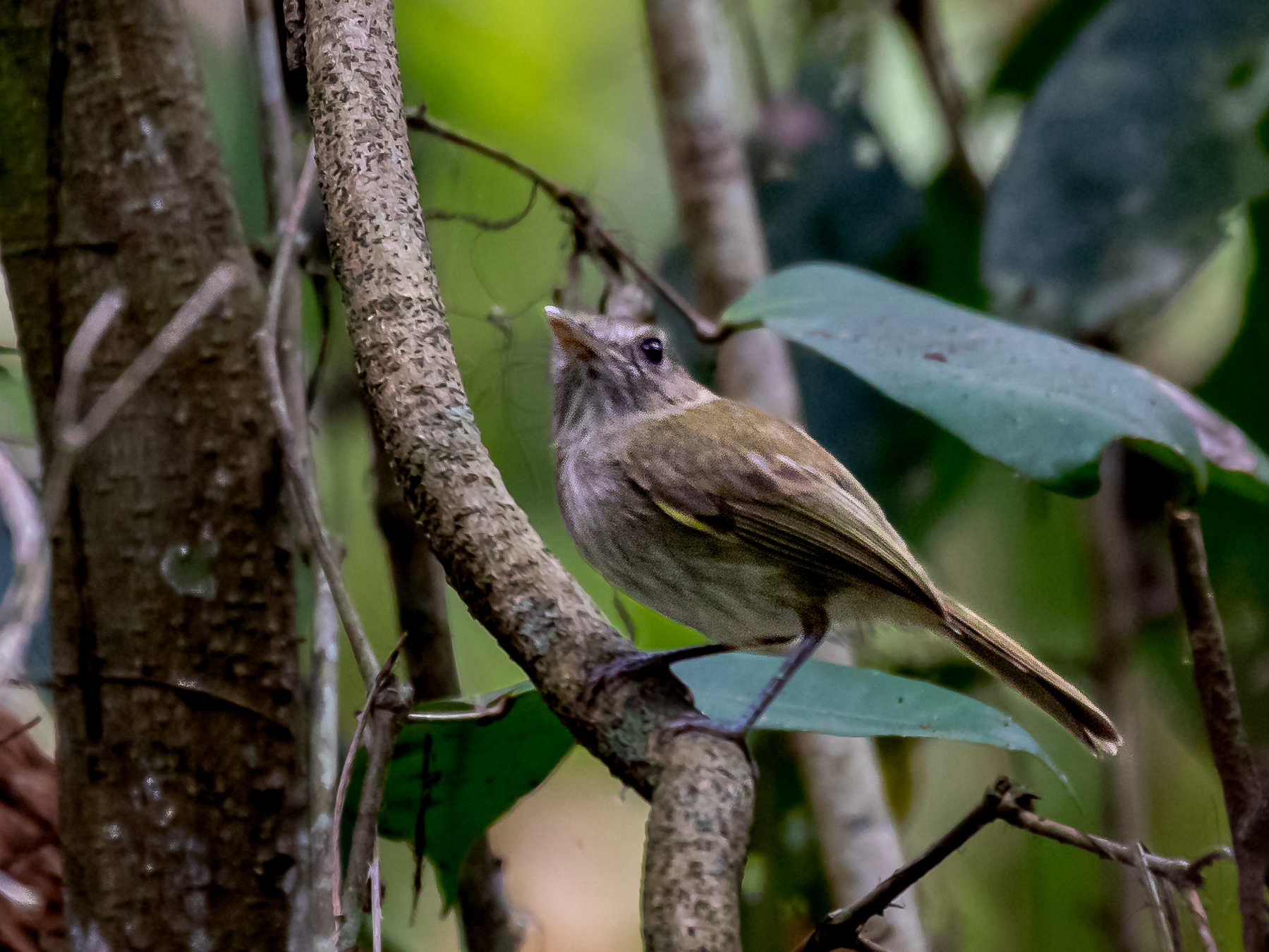

Conservation status
- Least Concern (IUCN 3.1)

Scientific classification
- Kingdom: Animalia
- Phylum: Chordata
- Class: Aves
- Order: Passeriformes
- Family: Tyrannidae
- Genus: Hemitriccus
- Species: H. flammulatus

Binomial name
- Hemitriccus flammulatus Berlepsch, 1901

= Flammulated bamboo tyrant =

Species of bird

The flammulated bamboo tyrant (Hemitriccus flammulatus), also called flammulated pygmy-tyrant, is a species of bird in the family Tyrannidae, the tyrant flycatchers. It is found in Brazil, Bolivia, and Peru.

== Taxonomy and systematics ==
The flammulated bamboo tyrant has two subspecies, the nominate H. f. flammulatus (Berlepsch, 1901) and H. f. olivacens (Todd, 1915).

Some early to mid-twentieth century authors considered the flammulated bamboo tyrant to be a subspecies of the drab-breasted bamboo tyrant (H. diops) but since at least 1966 most systems have recognized them as separate species. They and the brown-breasted bamboo tyrant (H. obsoletus) form a superspecies.

== Description ==
The brown-breasted bamboo tyrant is about 11 cm (4.3 in) long and weighs 8.8 to 11.7 g (0.31 to 0.41 oz). The sexes have the same plumage. Adults of the nominate subspecies have a plain olive green crown. They have a pale gray spot above the lores and a pale gray eye-ring on an otherwise olive green face. Their back and rump are olive green. Their wings are a slightly duskier olive green than their back with olive edges on the flight feathers. Their tail's upper side is olive and its underside duskier. Their throat is dull brownish gray with very faint darker streaks. Their breast is a darker brownish gray, also with very faint darker streaks, and it becomes white on the belly. Subspecies H. f. olivacens has a more yellowish crown, back, rump, flanks, and crissum than the nominate. Both subspecies have a reddish brown iris, a blackish maxilla, a pale gray mandible, and bluish gray legs and feet.

== Distribution and habitat ==
The nominate subspecies of the flammulated bamboo tyrant is found in eastern Peru between San Martín and Madre de Dios departments, east into far western Brazil's Acre and Rondônia states, and south and east into northern Bolivia to Beni and Cochabamba departments. In Rondônia and Cochabamba it is found along the Guapore (Mequéns) River that forms the border between them. Subspecies H. f. olivacens is found along the Surutú River in the western part of Santa Cruz Department in eastern Bolivia.

The flammulated bamboo tyrant inhabits terra firme forest where it almost exclusively associates with stands of Guadua bamboo. In elevation it mostly occurs below 500 m (1,600 ft) but is known as high as 1,300 m (4,300 ft). In Amazonian Peru it is found up to 850 m (2,800 ft). At the far northern part of its range in San Martín it occurs in dry forest between about 300 and 600 m (1,000 and 2,000 ft).

== Behavior ==
=== Movement ===
The flammulated bamboo tyrant is a year-round resident.

=== Feeding ===
The flammulated bamboo tyrant feeds on arthropods. It typically forages singly or in pairs and seldom joins mixed-species feeding flocks. It feeds mostly in undergrowth, using short upward strikes to the underside of leaves from a perch.

=== Breeding ===
The flammulated bamboo tyrant's breeding season has not been defined overall but is from August to November in southeastern Peru. Its nest and breeding biology have not been described but are believed to be similar to those of the brown-breasted bamboo tyrant, which see here.

=== Vocal and non-vocal sounds ===
The flammulated bamboo tyrant's song is "a popping, slightly descending series of low, stuttered notes: pip'ip'ip-pip'ip or a shorter series pip'ip". Its calls include "pip notes given singly or in [a] loose series". Its wings make an audible whirr in flight.

== Status ==
The IUCN has assessed the flammulated bamboo tyrant as being of Least Concern. It has a large range; its population size is not known and is believed to be decreasing. No immediate threats have been identified. It is considered widespread but uncommon in Peru. It occurs in several large protected areas in Peru and Bolivia.
