= Fernández Alonso =

Coordinates: 17.01°S 63.2322°W

- Town
- Interactive map of Fernández Alonso
- Country: Bolivia
- Time zone: UTC-4 (BOT)

Fernández Alonso is a town in Bolivia. In 2010 it had an estimated population of 8,922. It is the seat of the Municipality Fernández Alonso. It was named after Severo Fernández Alonso.
