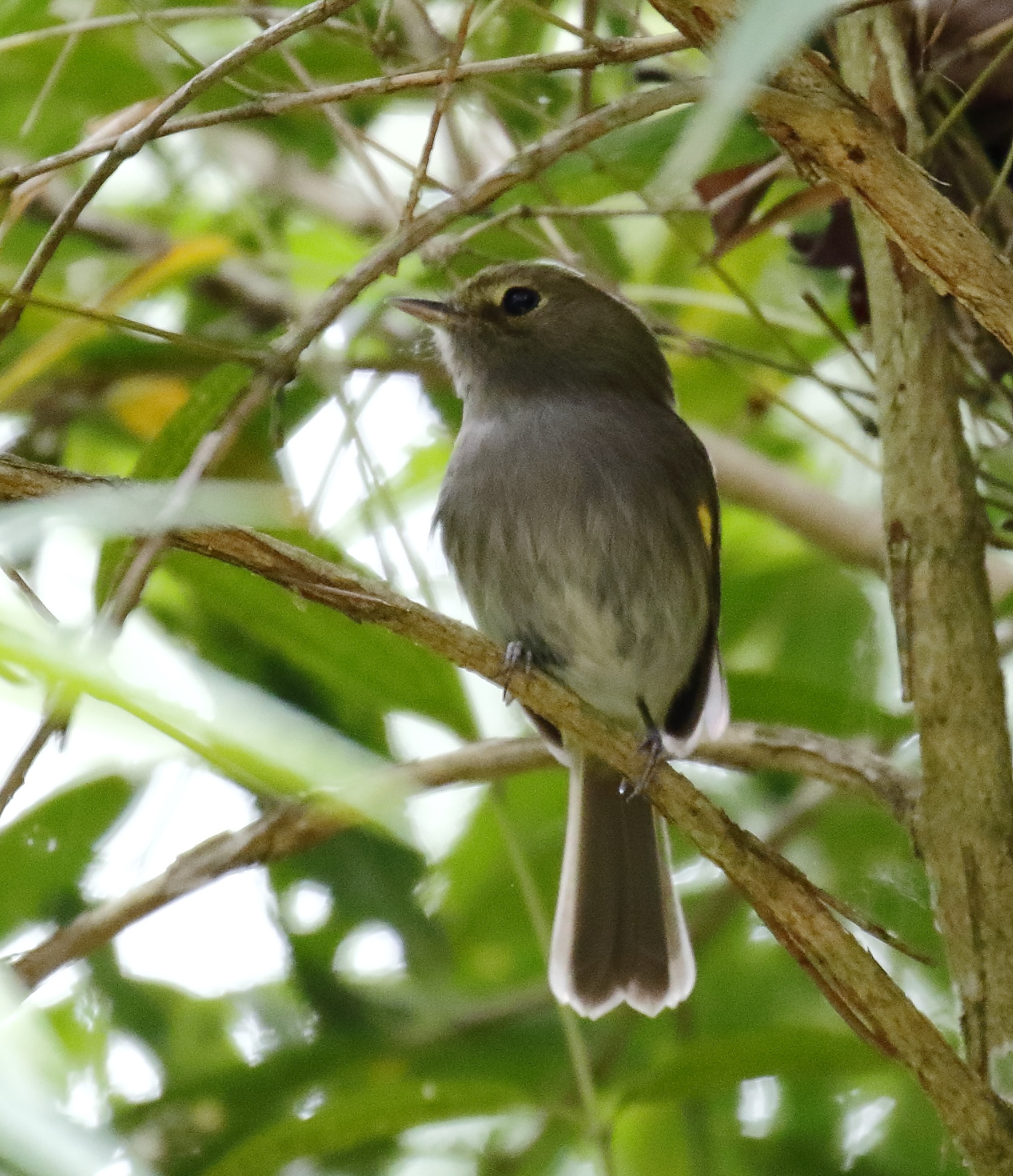
- At Salesópolis, São Paulo state, Brazil

Conservation status
- Least Concern (IUCN 3.1)

Scientific classification
- Kingdom: Animalia
- Phylum: Chordata
- Class: Aves
- Order: Passeriformes
- Family: Tyrannidae
- Genus: Hemitriccus
- Species: H. diops

Binomial name
- Hemitriccus diops (Temminck, 1822)

= Drab-breasted bamboo tyrant =

Species of bird

The drab-breasted bamboo tyrant or drab-breasted pygmy-tyrant (Hemitriccus diops) is a species of bird in the family Tyrannidae, the tyrant flycatchers. It is found in Argentina, Brazil, and Paraguay.

== Taxonomy and systematics ==
The drab-breasted bamboo tyrant is monotypic. Some early to mid-twentieth century authors considered it and what are now the brown-breasted bamboo tyrant (H. obsoletus) and flammulated bamboo tyrant (H. flammulatus) to be subspecies of it. Since at least 1966 most systems have recognized the three as individual species. They form a superspecies.

== Description ==
The drab-breasted bamboo tyrant is about 11 cm (4.3 in) long and weighs 9.5 to 13.5 g (0.34 to 0.48 oz). The sexes have the same plumage. Adults have a plain dark olive-green crown. They have a white spot above the lores and a white eye-ring on an otherwise olive-green face. Their back and rump are plain dark olive-green. Their wings and tail are plain olive though sometimes the innermost secondaries have paler edges. Their throat and breast are mostly dull gray with a pinkish or purplish tinge; there is a faint white crescent between them. Their belly is whitish and their crissum whitish with a yellow tinge. They have a reddish brown iris, a gray maxilla, a pinkish mandible, and light gray legs and feet.

== Distribution and habitat ==
The drab-breasted bamboo tyrant is found from Bahia state in east-central Brazil south to northern Rio Grande do Sul and into eastern Paraguay and northeastern Argentina's Misiones Province. It inhabits the interior and edges of humid primary forest and mature secondary forest, where it almost exclusively occurs in patches of bamboo. In elevation it ranges from near sea level to about 1,300 m (4,300 ft).

== Behavior ==
=== Movement ===
The drab-breasted bamboo tyrant is a year-round resident.

=== Feeding ===
The drab-breasted bamboo tyrant feeds on insects. It typically forages singly or in pairs and only rarely joins mixed-species feeding flocks. It feeds mostly in thick undergrowth with short upward sallies from a perch to glean prey from vegetation.

=== Breeding ===
The drab-breasted bamboo tyrant's breeding season has not been defined but includes October in southern Brazil. Its one known nest was a purse with a side entrance hanging from the end of a twig 1.8 m (6 ft) above the ground. It was made mostly from green mosses and plant fibers with fungal rhizomorphs, rootlets, and bark strips included. It contained two eggs that were mostly white with tiny brown speckles. The incubation period, time to fledging, and details of parental care are not known. There is a report of brood parasitism by a pavonine cuckoo (Dromococcyx pavoninus).

=== Vocalization ===
What may be either the song or a call of the drab-breasted bamboo tyrant is a "very high, upslurred, scratchy 'krrru', like a mini-rattle". Other vocalizations include " 'bit', 'sewit' or 'bit-biwít' ".

== Status ==
The IUCN has assessed the drab-breasted bamboo tyrant as being of Least Concern. It has a large range; its population size is not known and is believed to be decreasing. No immediate threats have been identified. It is considered uncommon to fairly common and occurs in many protected areas.
