= Buena Vista, Bolivia =

Buena Vista
- Location in Bolivia
- Coordinates: 17°27′32″S 63°39′33″W
- Country: Bolivia
- Elevation: 398 m (1,306 ft)

Population (2001)
  - Urban: 3,800
- Time zone: UTC-4 (BOT)
- Climate: Am

Buena Vista is a small town in the Bolivian lowlands, capital of the Ichilo Province of the department of Santa Cruz. The city was founded on November 26, 1694 as the Jesuit Mission of the betrothal of the Saints of Joseph and Mary.

.

== Location ==
Buena Vista is administrative center of the Ichilo Province and located in the Buena Vista Municipio on the right banks of Río Ichilo, 90 km south-west of the departmental capital Santa Cruz.

== Climate ==
Buena Vista has a medium yearly temperature of 24.3 °C, with a medium maximum of 27.8 °C and a minimum of 14.4 °C. The average precipitation amounts to 2,563 mm per year, the average relative humidity is 80%. The climate is a tropical humid one, with July being the coldest month and November the warmest.

== Population ==
The population of Buena Vista has increased strongly over the past decades, from 400 inhabitants (1969) to 2,900 (1992 census) and 3,800 inhabitants (2001 census). Estimations about the recent population figures differ strongly, some estimations say 12-14,000 inhabitants, presumably misinterpreting the municipio population as the city population.
