= San Julián, Santa Cruz =

Coordinates: 16.9064°S 62.6169°W

San Julián (Santa Cruz)
- Town
- Interactive map of San Julián (Santa Cruz)
- Country: Bolivia
- Department: Santa Cruz Department
- Province: Ñuflo de Chávez Province

Population (2012)
  - Total: 20,687
- Time zone: UTC-4 (BOT)

San Julián (Santa Cruz) is a small town in Bolivia that is the seat of San Julián municipality.

== Climate ==
Climate data for San Julián, Santa Cruz, elevation 305 m (1,001 ft), (1973–2013)
Month	Jan	Feb	Mar	Apr	May	Jun	Jul	Aug	Sep	Oct	Nov	Dec	Year
Mean daily maximum °C (°F)	32.5 (90.5)	32.2 (90.0)	32.5 (90.5)	31.6 (88.9)	29.0 (84.2)	27.7 (81.9)	28.6 (83.5)	30.8 (87.4)	31.9 (89.4)	33.4 (92.1)	33.2 (91.8)	32.8 (91.0)	31.4 (88.4)
Daily mean °C (°F)	27.4 (81.3)	27.3 (81.1)	26.9 (80.4)	26.9 (80.4)	25.8 (78.4)	23.3 (73.9)	21.7 (71.1)	21.7 (71.1)	23.4 (74.1)	25.1 (77.2)	27.0 (80.6)	27.2 (81.0)	25.3 (77.6)
Mean daily minimum °C (°F)	22.1 (71.8)	21.7 (71.1)	21.3 (70.3)	20.0 (68.0)	17.4 (63.3)	15.6 (60.1)	14.8 (58.6)	16.1 (61.0)	18.2 (64.8)	20.6 (69.1)	21.2 (70.2)	22.0 (71.6)	19.2 (66.7)
Average precipitation mm (inches)	197.6 (7.78)	73.2 (2.88)	128.3 (5.05)	93.1 (3.67)	78.5 (3.09)	54.0 (2.13)	32.3 (1.27)	39.8 (1.57)	68.0 (2.68)	92.9 (3.66)	137.8 (5.43)	181.2 (7.13)	1,176.7 (46.34)
Average precipitation days	12.8	12.1	10.5	7.1	6.5	4.0	2.9	2.9	4.7	6.4	8.7	11.7	90.3
Average relative humidity (%)	83.4	83.9	83.0	82.3	81.7	79.1	72.4	68.5	69.0	70.7	76.1	81.1	77.6
Source: Servicio Nacional de Meteorología e Hidrología de Bolivia
