= Concepción, Santa Cruz =

Concepción
- Town
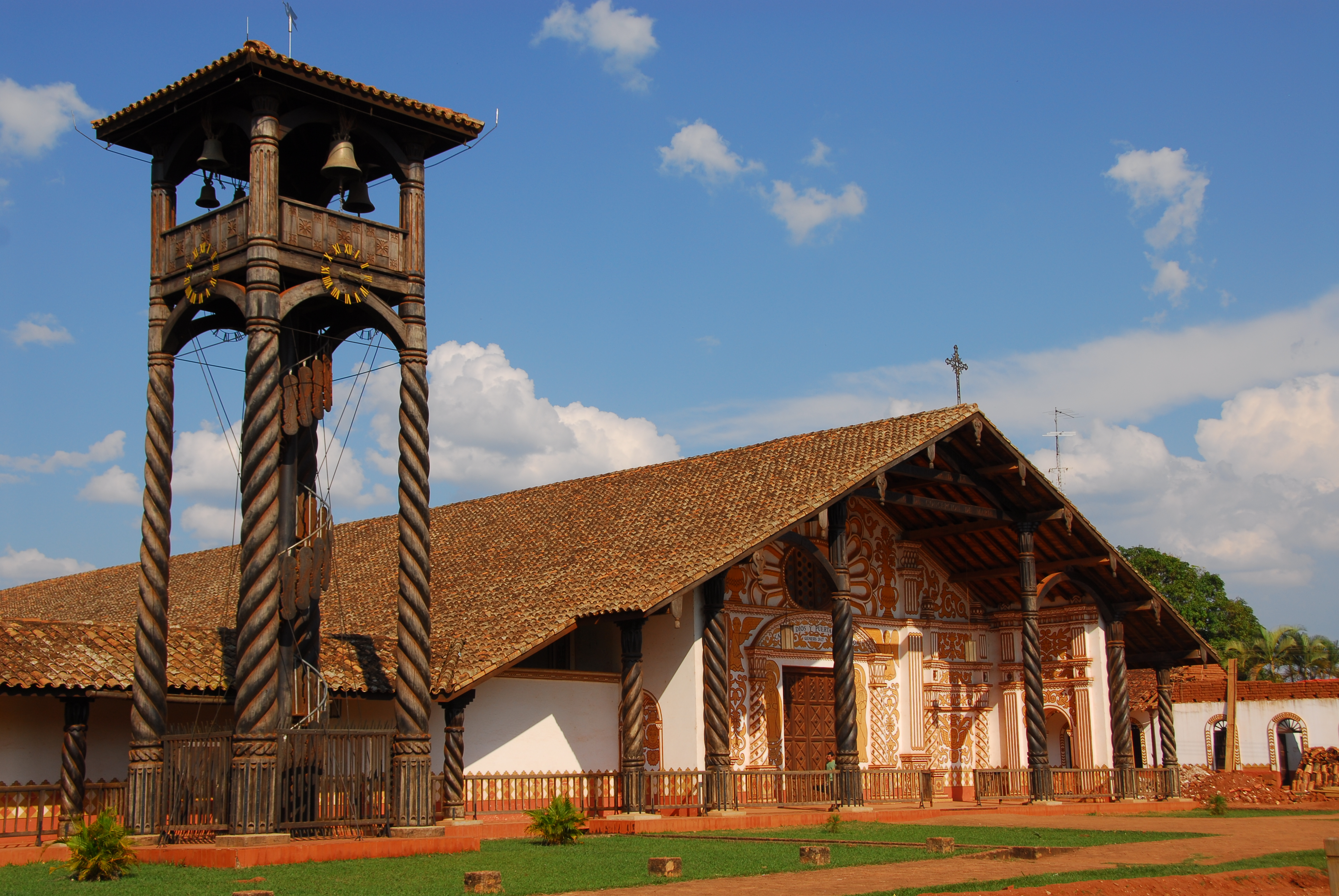
- Immaculate Conception Cathedral, Concepción

- Location in Bolivia
- Coordinates: 16°07′55″S 62°01′34″W
- Country: Bolivia
- Department: Santa Cruz Department
- Province: Ñuflo de Chávez Province

Population (2008)
  - Total: 8,221 (est)
- Time zone: UTC-4 (BOT)
- Climate: Aw

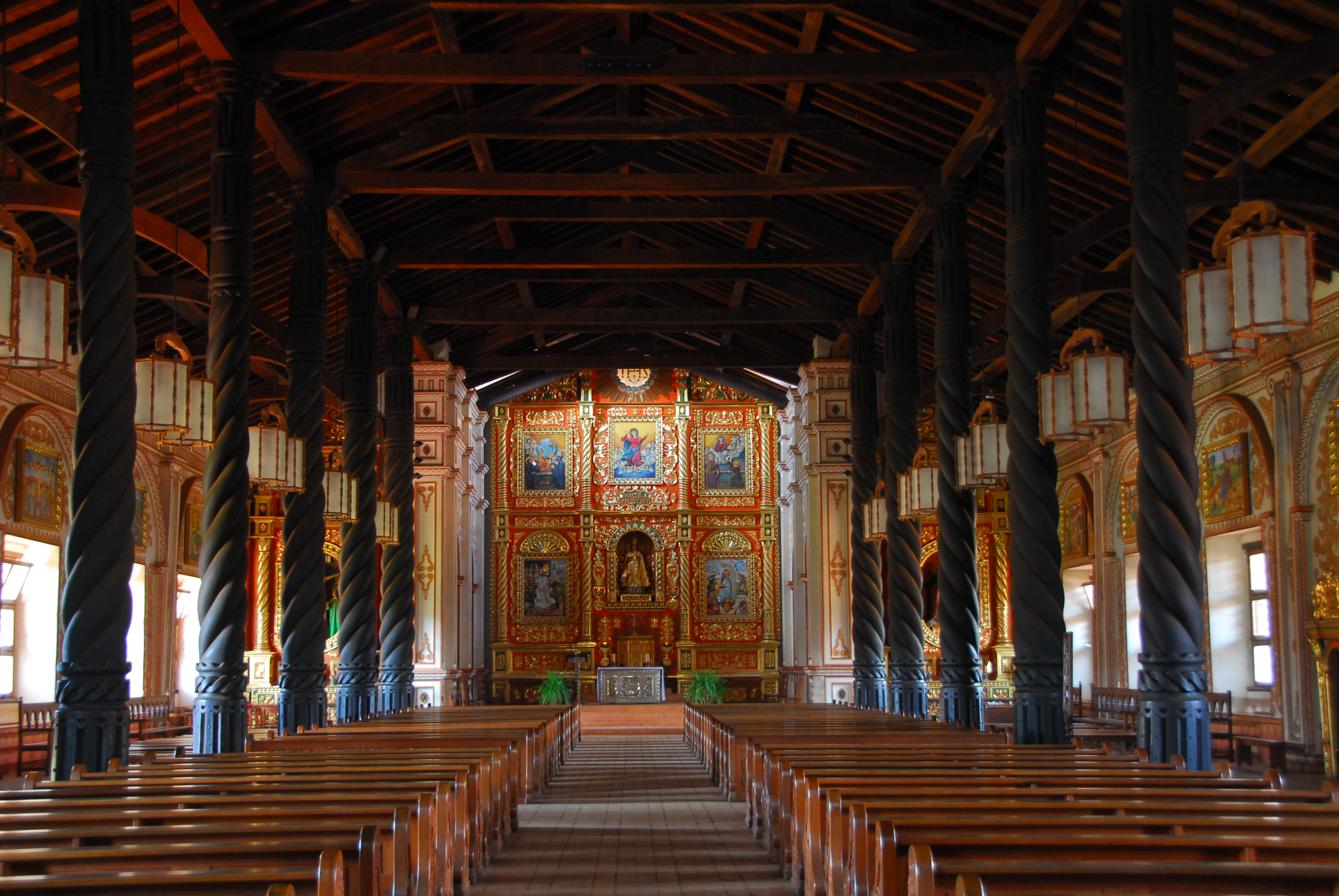
Interior of the church

Concepción is a town in the lowlands of eastern Bolivia. It is known as part of the Jesuit Missions of Chiquitos, declared in 1990 a World Heritage Site, as a former Jesuit Reduction.

== Location ==
Concepción is the capital of Ñuflo de Chávez Province in the Santa Cruz Department and is located at an elevation of 500 m above sea level, circa 250 kilometers northeast of Santa Cruz de la Sierra, the department's capital.

== History ==
Concepción was founded in 1699 by Jesuits Francisco Lucas Caballero and Francisco Hervás. It served as a mission for the Christianization of the Chiquitano and Guaraní peoples. In 1722 the village moved to its present place, and in 1745 it was inhabited by circa 2,000 people of the Punasicas, Boococas, Tubasicas, Paicones, Puyzocas, Quimonecas, Quitemos, Napecas, Paunacas and Tapacuracas tribes.

Between 1753 and 1756 the cathedral of Concepción was built (see photo), which still is the center of the blooming town. In 1766, Concepción was inhabited by 713 families and 3,276 persons. When in 1767 Charles III expelled the Jesuits and the village was administered by secular authorities, many of its inhabitants fled to the woods.

During the decade that followed the population decreased drastically, caused by epidemics, famine, the mismanagement of the new clergy and - at the end of the 19th century - by deporting the indigenous population to the rubber plantations.

== Languages ==
Camba Spanish is the most commonly used everyday language. The Bésɨro dialect of Chiquitano is also spoken in the town.

== Infrastructure ==
Concepción has a gravel airfield of 1,900 m length (Airport-Code CEP).

== Population ==
The town's population has increased strongly in the past decades:

- 1969: 1,100 inhabitants
- 1992: 3,228 inhabitants (census)
- 2001: 5,586 inhabitants (census)
- 2008: 8,221 inhabitants (est.)

== Climate ==
The climate in the Concepción area is typical of the Bolivian lowlands east of the Andes, and weather data from Concepción is used to illustrate the weather and climate of the region.

Climate data for Concepción, Santa Cruz, elevation 497 m (1,631 ft)
Month	Jan	Feb	Mar	Apr	May	Jun	Jul	Aug	Sep	Oct	Nov	Dec	Year
Record high °C (°F)	39.6 (103.3)	38.0 (100.4)	35.4 (95.7)	35.4 (95.7)	34.0 (93.2)	34.5 (94.1)	34.6 (94.3)	38.0 (100.4)	37.5 (99.5)	38.3 (100.9)	38.5 (101.3)	38.8 (101.8)	39.6 (103.3)
Mean daily maximum °C (°F)	30.4 (86.7)	30.0 (86.0)	29.9 (85.8)	29.3 (84.7)	27.4 (81.3)	27.0 (80.6)	27.8 (82.0)	29.8 (85.6)	31.2 (88.2)	31.9 (89.4)	31.1 (88.0)	30.5 (86.9)	29.7 (85.4)
Daily mean °C (°F)	25.4 (77.7)	25.1 (77.2)	24.9 (76.8)	24.0 (75.2)	21.9 (71.4)	20.9 (69.6)	20.8 (69.4)	22.5 (72.5)	24.4 (75.9)	25.6 (78.1)	25.4 (77.7)	25.4 (77.7)	23.9 (74.9)
Mean daily minimum °C (°F)	20.3 (68.5)	20.1 (68.2)	19.6 (67.3)	18.3 (64.9)	16.2 (61.2)	14.6 (58.3)	13.6 (56.5)	15.0 (59.0)	17.3 (63.1)	19.0 (66.2)	19.6 (67.3)	20.2 (68.4)	17.8 (64.1)
Record low °C (°F)	10.9 (51.6)	10.1 (50.2)	9.2 (48.6)	7.8 (46.0)	3.8 (38.8)	1.5 (34.7)	−1.8 (28.8)	1.0 (33.8)	4.1 (39.4)	9.0 (48.2)	10 (50)	10.8 (51.4)	−1.8 (28.8)
Average precipitation mm (inches)	182.3 (7.18)	163.9 (6.45)	133.9 (5.27)	80.5 (3.17)	58.2 (2.29)	34.3 (1.35)	24.0 (0.94)	30.0 (1.18)	51.0 (2.01)	93.9 (3.70)	136.9 (5.39)	173 (6.8)	1,161.9 (45.73)
Average precipitation days	14.9	13.7	12.3	7.6	5.5	3.3	2.2	2.4	4.0	7.4	10.3	13.1	96.7
Average relative humidity (%)	82.0	81.8	81.5	80.2	79.2	75.7	68.2	62.1	61.7	68.7	74.3	80.3	74.6
Source: Servicio Nacional de Meteorología e Hidrología de Bolivia

== Famous inhabitants ==
- Hugo Banzer Suárez (1926–2002), Bolivian president 1971-1978 and 1997–2002

== See also ==
- Immaculate Conception Cathedral, Concepción
- List of Jesuit sites
- List of the Jesuit Missions of Chiquitos
