= San Juan de Yapacaní =

Coordinates: 17.2917°S 63.8467°W

- Town
- Interactive map of San Juan de Yapacaní
- Country: Bolivia
- Time zone: UTC-4 (BOT)

San Juan de Yapacaní is a small town in Bolivia. San Juan de Yapacaní, officially San Juan, is a town and municipality in Bolivia, located in the province of Ichilo in the department of Santa Cruz. It is located 124 km northwest of the city of Santa Cruz de la Sierra on Route 4 on the bank of the Yapacaní River. The population is 9,191 inhabitants (Census 2012). The territorial extension is 1,620 km^{2}

Along with the Okinawa Colony, it is one of the two Japanese colonies found in Bolivia. This town became a municipality in 2001 by Law No.2233 of the Republic of Bolivia, which was signed into law by Acting President Jorge Quiroga.

== Climate ==
The climate is typical savannah to subtropical wet forest, where the annual average temperature of 24.1 °C is recorded (average maximum of 29.1 °C and average minimum of 19.4 °C). The average rainfall is 1,881 mm. In the wet season, precipitation is in the form of intense rain and lightning storms, while in the dry season it is in the form of showers.

== History ==
Immigration from Japan began in 1955 with 88 people and lasted until 1992. In total 1,685 immigrants arrived in 53 groups.

At the beginning of colonization, they cultivated upland rice, maize, cassava, yams and legumes. In its early years, the colony was unable to ship most of the rice it produced, due to the unimproved road being impassable when wet. After reaching the main road to Montero, five to six more hours of travel were necessary to arrive at markets. Improvements to the road to the colony and the Montero-Yapacaní highway created more opportunities for the colonists. Also, they established poultry farms, mainly with chickens, which in the mid-70's consisted of 30% of chicken farming in Bolivia. Electrification reached San Juan in 1979 and the colonists participate in various marketing cooperatives.

From 1966 the first agricultural machineries are introduced that significantly increased agricultural production. In 1969 some varieties of soybeans were introduced that would become one of the typical crops of the colony before its cultivation spread to other parts of Bolivia.

Currently, in San Juan they farm soy, laying hens and chickens, rain fed rice and citrus fruits. Also, lately, they have been harvesting macadamia nuts and irrigated rice.

Since 1997, they started procedures to convert the municipality, which was dependent by the municipality of San Carlos, to a new independent and autonomous municipality headed by Mr. Jorge Torrez Cerezo and after many years of management, the creation of the Fourth Section of the province Ichilo was approved and Law No. 2233, dated July 26 200, was proclaimed by the Acting President Jorge Quiroga.

And from 2005, the Autonomous Municipal Government of San Juan has been functioning, with its first Mayor being Mr. Katsumi Bani Abe, elected by the Citizens Association XXI Century San Juan.

== Sources ==
- Nelson, Michael (2013). The Development of Tropical Lands: Policy Issues in Latin America. Routledge. ISBN 9781135993580.
- Schmink, Marianne; Wood, Charles H. (1984). Frontier Expansion in Amazonia. University Press of Florida. ISBN 978-0-8130-0785-4.
