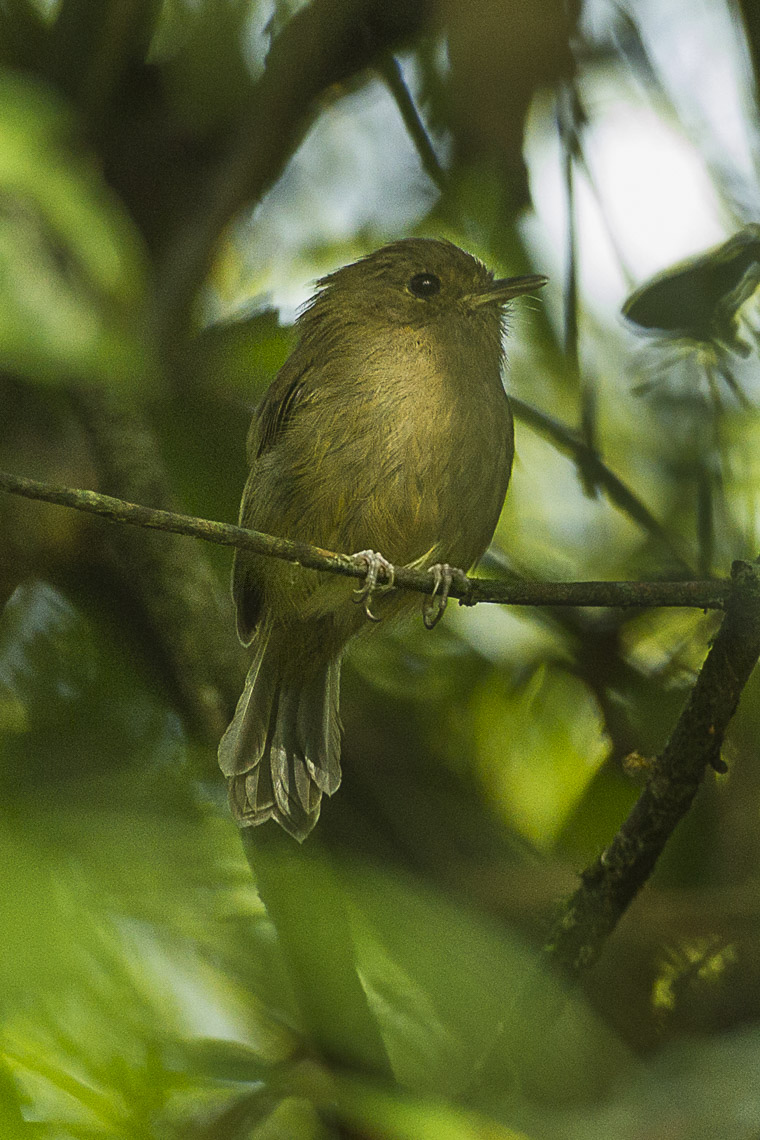

Conservation status
- Least Concern (IUCN 3.1)

Scientific classification
- Kingdom: Animalia
- Phylum: Chordata
- Class: Aves
- Order: Passeriformes
- Family: Tyrannidae
- Genus: Hemitriccus
- Species: H. obsoletus

Binomial name
- Hemitriccus obsoletus (Miranda-Ribeiro, 1905)

= Brown-breasted bamboo tyrant =

Species of bird

The brown-breasted bamboo tyrant or brown-breasted pygmy-tyrant (Hemitriccus obsoletus) is a species of bird in the family Tyrannidae, the tyrant flycatchers. It is found in Argentina and Brazil.

== Taxonomy and systematics ==
The brown-breasted bamboo tyrant has two subspecies, the nominate H. o. obsoletus (Miranda-Ribeiro, 1905) and H. o. zimmeri (Traylor, 1979). There is some evidence that zimmeri deserves full species status.

Some early to mid-twentieth century authors considered the brown-breasted bamboo tyrant to be a subspecies of the drab-breasted bamboo tyrant (H. diops) but since at least 1966 most systems have recognized them as separate species. They and the flammulated bamboo tyrant (H. flammulatus) form a superspecies.

== Description ==
The brown-breasted bamboo tyrant is about 11 cm (4.3 in) long and weighs 9 to 11 g (0.32 to 0.39 oz). The sexes have the same plumage. Adults of the nominate subspecies have a plain brownish olive crown. They have a buffy spot above the lores and a pale buffy eye-ring on an otherwise brownish face. Their back and rump are plain brownish olive. Their wings are plain brownish olive and their tail is dusky. Their throat and breast are dingy buff with a faint buffy crescent between them. Their belly is buffy ochraceous and their crissum buffy with a yellow tinge. Subspecies H. o. zimmeri has a more greenish crown, back, and rump than the nominate, with a slightly more ochraceous tinge to their breast and sides and a stronger ochraceous color to the belly and crissum. Both subspecies have a reddish brown iris, a gray maxilla, a pinkish mandible, and light gray legs and feet.

== Distribution and habitat ==
The brown-breasted bamboo tyrant has a disjunct distribution. The nominate subspecies is found in western Rio de Janeiro and eastern São Paulo states in southeastern Brazil. Subspecies H. o. zimmeri is found further south, from Paraná state in southeastern Brazil south to northern Rio Grande do Sul in Brazil and Misiones Province in extreme northeastern Argentina. It inhabits the interior and edges of humid primary forest and mature secondary forest, where it almost exclusively occurs in patches of bamboo. In elevation it ranges from 500 to 2,300 m (1,600 to 7,500 ft) though it mostly occurs above 1,200 m (3,900 ft).

== Behavior ==
=== Movement ===
The brown-breasted bamboo tyrant is a year-round resident.

=== Feeding ===
The brown-breasted bamboo tyrant feeds on insects. It typically forages singly or in pairs and is not known to join mixed-species feeding flocks. It feeds mostly in undergrowth between about 1 and 3 m (3 and 10 ft) of the ground, using short upward strikes to the underside of leaves from a perch.

=== Breeding ===
The brown-breasted bamboo tyrant's breeding season has not been detailed but includes November and December in southeastern Brazil. It has a nest unlike those of most other Hemitriccus flycatchers. One well described nest was a globe with a domed roof and a side entrance that had a small "visor". The cup part was mostly bamboo leaves and plant down, and the dome green moss, Tillandsia leaves, and fungal rhizomorphs. It was attached to Chusquea bamboo stalks about 0.5 m (1.5 ft) above the ground. It held two eggs. The incubation period, time to fledging, and details of parental care are not known.

=== Vocal and non-vocal sounds ===
What may be either the song or a call of the brown-breasted bamboo tyrant is an "irregular series of very high 'tic' notes". It also makes "a buzzy 'brrrrrr' " with its wings.

== Status ==
The IUCN has assessed the brown-breasted bamboo tyrant as being of Least Concern. Its population size is not known and is believed to be decreasing. No immediate threats have been identified. It is considered uncommon to fairly common and occurs in several protected areas. "Montane forests have suffered less destruction than have adjacent lowland areas, but isolated patches in [north] of this species' range have virtually disappeared owing to expansion of pasture and cultivation."
