= Ichilo Province =

Coordinates: 17°00′S 64°20′W

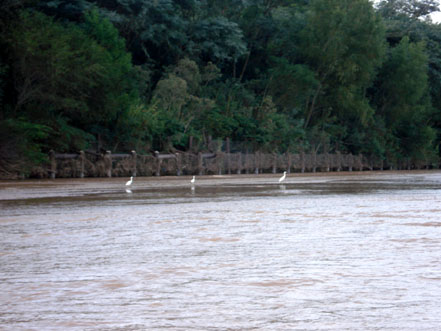
- View of Rio Piray
- Interactive map of Ichilo Province

Area
  - Total: 14,232 km^{2} (5,495 sq mi)

Population (2024)
  - Total: 100,473
  - Density: 6.8/km^{2} (18/sq mi)
- ISO 3166 code: BO.SC.IC

Ichilo is one of the fifteen provinces of the Bolivian Santa Cruz Department and is situated in the department's north-western parts. The province was founded by a decree of 8 April 1926 and is named after Río Ichilo which is forming the province border in the West.

== Location ==
Ichilo Province is located between 15° 48' and 18° 00' South and between 63° 27' and 64° 50' West. It extends over 350 km from Northwest to Southeast, and up to 110 km from Southwest to Northeast.

The province is situated in the Bolivian lowlands and borders Beni Department in the North, Cochabamba Department in the West, Manuel María Caballero Province in the Southwest, Florida Province in the South, Andrés Ibáñez Province in the Southeast, Sara Province in the East, and Ñuflo de Chávez Province in the Northeast.

== Population ==
The population of Ichilo Province has increased by circa 80% over the recent two decades:

- 1992: 49,484 inhabitants (census)
- 2001: 70,444 inhabitants (census)
- 2005: 81,118 inhabitants (est.)
- 2024: 100,473 inhabitants (census)

47.8% of the population are younger than 15 years old. (1992)

The literacy rate of the province is 94.6%. (2012)

96.1% of the population speak Spanish, 40.7% speak Quechua, 1.9% Aymara, and 0.6 speak Guaraní. (1992)

67.1% of the population have no access to electricity, 46.6% have no sanitary facilities. (1992)

81.3% of the population are Catholics, 15.1% are Protestants. (1992)

== Geography ==
The medium altitude of the province is 386 m. The medium annual temperature in the province is 24.3 °C, the annual precipitation amounts to 2,563 mm.

== Towns ==
Buena Vista is the province capital with 4,697 inhabitants (est. 2008). Other important towns in the province are

- Yapacaní - 21,622 inhabitants (2008)
- Santa Fe de Yapacaní - 7,736 inhabitants (2008)
- San Carlos, Ichilo - 4,440 inhabitants (2008)
- San Juan de Yapacaní - 4,121 inhabitants (2008)

== Industry ==
Main agricultural good of the province is rice, 50% of all the production in the Santa Cruz Department is from Ichilo Province. Other important economic goods are cocoa and timber.

== Division ==
The province comprises four municipalities:

- Buena Vista Municipality 2,047 km^{2} - 13,273 inhabitants (2001)
- San Carlos Municipality 3,998 km^{2} - 25,633 inhabitants (2001)
- Yapacaní Municipality 8,187 km^{2} - 31,538 inhabitants (2001)
- San Juan de Yapacaní Municipality - 9,131 inhabitants (2001)
