= San Antonio de Lomerío =

- Location in Bolivia
- Coordinates: 16°46′S 61°49′W
- Country: Bolivia
- Department: Santa Cruz Department
- Province: Ñuflo de Chávez Province
- Municipality: San Antonio de Lomerío Municipality
- Canton: San Antonio de Lomerío Canton

Population (2012)
  - Total: 1,677
- Time zone: UTC-4 (BOT)

San Antonio de Lomerío is a village located in the Ñuflo de Chávez Province in the Santa Cruz Department of Bolivia.
