= Ignacio Warnes Province =

Province of Bolivia

Provincia Ignacio Warnes
- Province
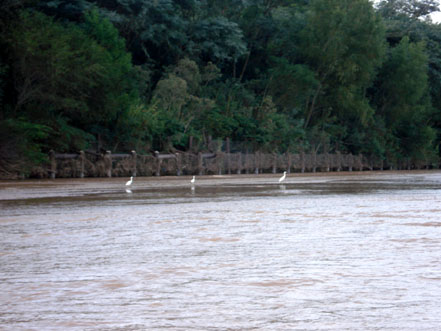
- View of Río Piray near Warnes
- Interactive map of Provincia Ignacio Warnes
- Coordinates: 17°20′S 63°00′W
- Country: Bolivia
- Department: Santa Cruz

Area
  - Total: 1,216 km^{2} (470 sq mi)

Population (2024)
  - Total: 161,311
  - Density: 132.7/km^{2} (343.6/sq mi)
- ISO 3166 code: BO.SC.WR

Ignacio Warnes is one of the fifteen provinces of the Bolivian Santa Cruz Department and is situated in the department's central parts. The province name honors Colonel Ignacio Warnes (1772–1816), a military leader in the South American war of independence. Its capital is Warnes.

== Location ==
Ignacio Warnes Province is located between 17° 00' and 17° 42' South and between 62° 42' and 63° 14' West. It extends over 85 km from North to South, and 70 km from West to East. Río Piray is forming the province border in the West and Río Grande in the East.

The province is situated in the Bolivian lowlands and borders Obispo Santistevan Province in the Northwest, Sara Province in the West, Andrés Ibáñez Province in the South, and Ñuflo de Chávez Province in the East.

== Population ==
The population of Ignacio Warnes Province has increased by circa 75% over the recent two decades:

- 1992: 38,285 inhabitants (census)
- 2001: 54,593 inhabitants (census)
- 2012: 108,888 inhabitants (census)
- 2024: 161,311 inhabitants (census)

In 1992, 46.2% of the population were younger than 15. 95.2% of the population spoke Spanish, 14.2% spoke Quechua, 4.1% Guaraní, and 1.3 spoke Aymara. 41.9% of the population had no access to electricity and 47.9% had no sanitary facilities. 88.4% of the population were Catholics and 8.8% were Protestants. (1992)

In 2012, the literacy rate of the province was 96.9%. (2012)

== Subdivision ==
The province is divided into two municipalities which are further subdivided into cantons. The municipalities with their seats are:

Section	Municipality	Inhabitants (2001)	Seat
1st	Warnes Municipality	42,631	Warnes
2nd	Okinawa Uno Municipality	11,961	Okinawa
