= San Carlos, Bolivia =

San Carlos (Ichilo)
- Town
- Location within Bolivia
- Coordinates: 19.3075°S 64.3022°W
- Country: Bolivia
- Department: Santa Cruz
- Province: Ichilo
- Time zone: UTC-4 (BOT)

San Carlos (Ichilo) is a small town in Bolivia.
