= Puerto Fernández Alonso =

Fernández Alonso
- Municipality
- Interactive map of Fernández Alonso
- Coordinates: 17°06′00″S 63°14′00″W
- Country: Bolivia
- Department: Santa Cruz Department
- province: Obispo Santistevan Province
- Seat: Fernández Alonso

Area
  - Total: 760.1 km^{2} (293.5 sq mi)

Population
  - Total: 15,117

Puerto Fernández Alonso is a municipality in the province Obispo Santistevan in the department Santa Cruz in Bolivia. It is also known as Fernández Alonso.

== History ==
The municipality was created by Law 2320 on 28 January 2002. It comprised two cantons:

- Fernández Alonso
- Chané Independencia

Before 2002, these localities were part of the municipality of Mineros.
