= Bolivia–Japan relations =

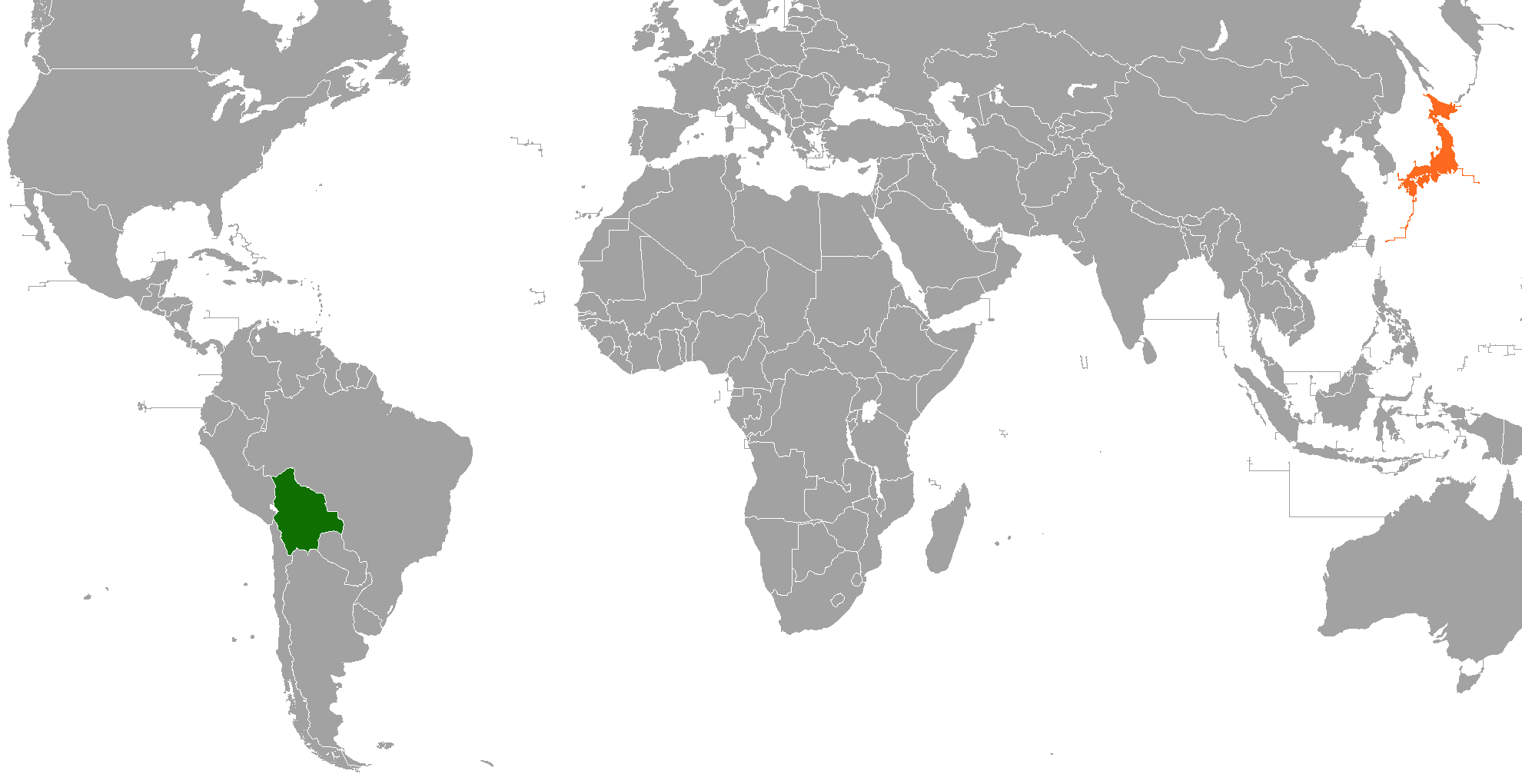
- Bolivia: Japan

The Plurinational State of Bolivia and Japan enjoy friendly relations—the importance of which centers on the history of Japanese migration to the former. Approximately 14,000 Bolivians have Japanese ancestry. Both nations are members of the Forum of East Asia–Latin America Cooperation.

== History ==
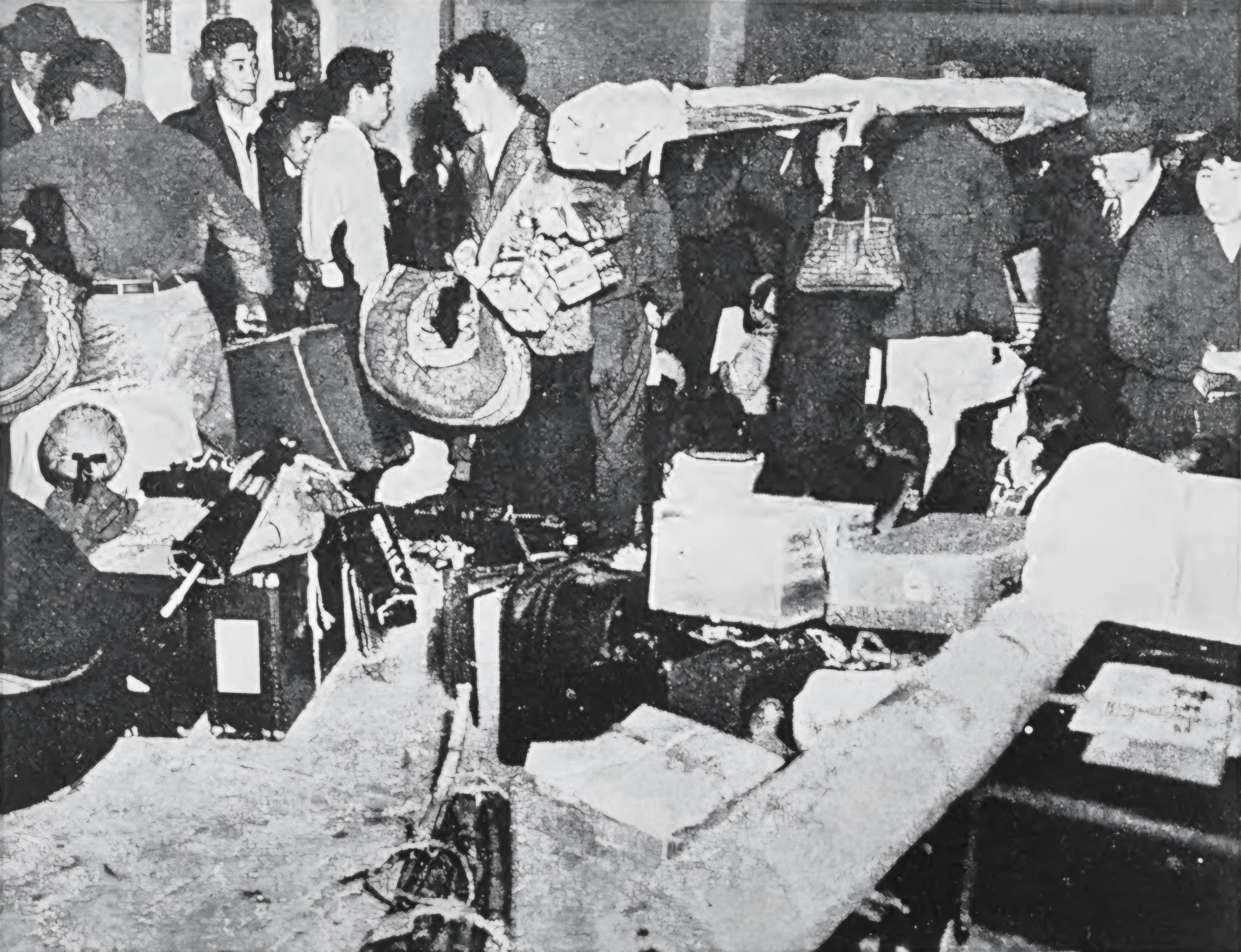
Japanese migrants from Okinawa in Bolivia

The first known Japanese migrants to arrive to Bolivia was in 1899 when ninety-one Japanese laborers entered the country from Peru to work on rubber plantations in Bolivia. For the next several decades, several thousands Japanese migrants immigrated to Bolivia for employment opportunities. Most of the Japanese migrants settled in the Beni and Santa Cruz Departments. On 3 April 1914, Bolivia and Japan established diplomatic relations.

During World War II, Bolivia broke diplomatic relations with Japan. With the exception of 29 deportees to the United States, World War II had little impact on the lives of Nikkei residents in Bolivia, especially since the government did not adopt anti-Japanese measures. On 20 December 1952, relations were re-established between both nations.

In 1954, several Japanese residents from the U.S.-controlled Okinawa Prefecture were resettled to Bolivia. The necessity of transplanting surplus populations from war-torn Japan met the Bolivian government's desire to develop the eastern lower lands in Santa Cruz Department. The new settlers laid down the foundation of a "New Okinawa", called Colonia Okinawa, near the city of Santa Cruz de la Sierra.

In 1991, Bolivian President Jaime Paz Zamora became the first Bolivian head-of-state to visit Japan. In 1999, Japanese Princess Sayako Kuroda paid a visit to Bolivia to commemorate the centenary of Japanese immigration to Bolivia. In 2009, Japanese Prince Hitachi paid a visit to Bolivia to commemorate the 110th anniversary of Japanese immigration to Bolivia. Prince Hitachi also paid a visit to the town of New Okinawa. The Japan International Cooperation Agency has an office in Bolivia and oversees several development projects in the country.

== High-level visits ==
High-level visits from Bolivia to Japan

- President Jaime Paz Zamora (1991)
- President Gonzalo Sánchez de Lozada (1996)
- President Evo Morales (2007, 2010)

High-level visits from Japan to Bolivia

- Princess Sayako Kuroda (1999)
- Prince Hitachi (2009)
- Princess Mako of Akishino (2019)

== Bilateral agreements ==
Both nations have signed bilateral agreements such as: Agreement for Japanese immigration to Bolivia (1956); Agreement for the Cooperation of Japanese volunteers in Bolivia (1977) and an Agreement of Technical Cooperation (1978).

== Trade ==
In 2017, trade between Bolivia and Japan totaled US$913 million. Bolivia's main exports to Japan include: zinc, silver, iron, sesame seeds, coffee, sugar and quinoa. Japan's main exports to Bolivia include: automobiles, automobiles parts, machinery, electrical equipment, and motorcycles. Japanese multinational company Sumitomo Group operates in Bolivia.

Japanese cultural and media exports to Bolivia include anime, J-pop, video games, foreign language education, and food.

== Resident diplomatic missions ==
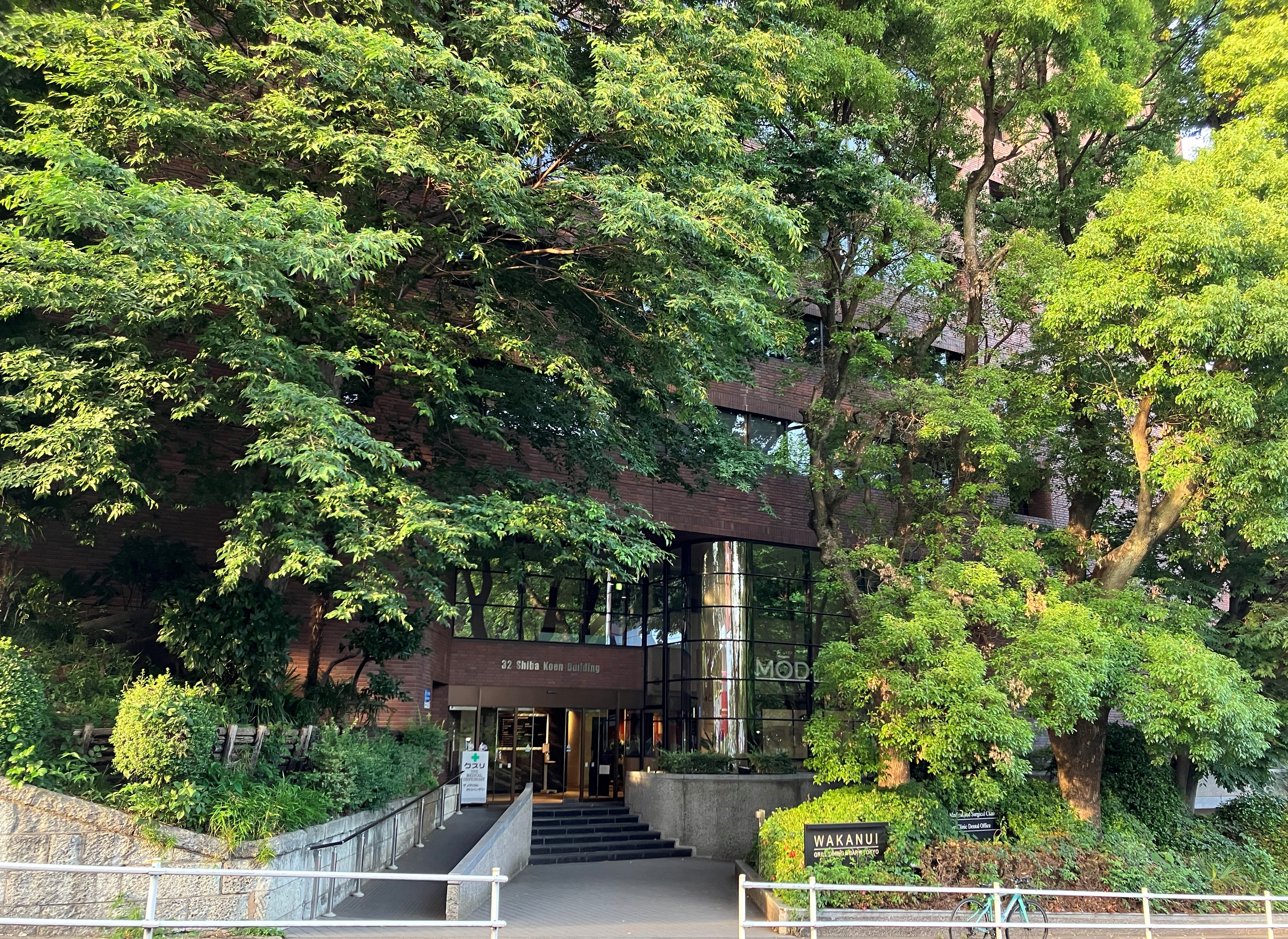
Building hosting the Embassy of Bolivia in Tokyo

- Bolivia has an embassy in Tokyo.
- Japan has an embassy in La Paz and a consular office in Santa Cruz de la Sierra.
