= Cuatro Cañadas =

Coordinates: 17.2672°S 62.5589°W

- Town
- Interactive map of Cuatro Cañadas
- Country: Bolivia
- Time zone: UTC-4 (BOT)

Cuatro Cañadas is a town in Bolivia. In 2009 it had an estimated population of 7,305.
