= San Ramón, Santa Cruz =

Coordinates: 16.6133°S 62.4989°W

San Ramón (Santa Cruz)
- Town
- Interactive map of San Ramón (Santa Cruz)
- Country: Bolivia
- Time zone: UTC-4 (BOT)

San Ramón (Santa Cruz) is a small town in Bolivia. The population in 2001 was 5,660, in 2012 was 7,490, and in 2024 was 8,541.
