= San Ramón Municipality, Santa Cruz =

San Ramón
- Municipality
- Flag

- Location of the San Ramón Municipality within Bolivia
- San Ramón Municipality and its local surroundings
- Location of San Ramón Municipality within Bolivia
- Country: Bolivia
- Department: Santa Cruz
- Province: Ñuflo de Chávez

Government
  - Mayor: Germán Sánchez Padilla (A-UPP, 2026)

Area
  - Municipality: 5,061 km^{2} (1,954 sq mi)

Population (2024)
  - Municipality: 8,541
  - Density: 1.7/km^{2} (4.4/sq mi)
  - Urban: 7,344
  - Rural: 1,197
  - Indigenous ethnicities: Chiquitano: 763 (9%); Unspecified Indigenous: 426 (5%); Quechua: 297 (3%)
- 2024 Bolivian census
- Time zone: UTC-4 (BOT)
- Geocode: 071103 (INE code); BO071103 (OCHA P-code)

San Ramón Municipality is the third municipal section of the Ñuflo de Chaves Province in the Santa Cruz Department in Bolivia.

The settlement at San Ramón dates to the 1792 presence of Jesuit missionaries. The municipality of San Ramón was created by law on March 18, 1999, which also established San Antonio de Lomerío Municipality.

== Communities ==
The following communities are located within the municipality:

- San Ramon
- Santa Rosa de la Mina
- 5 de Mayo
- El Cerrito
- Los Puquios
- Villa Brasil
- Alemana
- Campamento Militar
- El Palmar
- San Ramon (Disperso)
- Bella Vista
- El Pejichi

== Government ==
The Mayor of San Ramón is Germán Sánchez Padilla, who was elected in the March 2026 elections.

San Ramón has a municipal council with five seats, as do all municipalities with populations up to 15,000.

Seat	Type	Name	Party / Political Organization
1	Member	Leónela Velasco Roca	es:Alianza Unidos Por los Pueblos
1	Alternate	Mario Valverde Peña	es:Alianza Unidos Por los Pueblos
2	Member	Luis Fernando Velasco Molina	Creemos
2	Alternate	Carla Daniela Cuéllar Justiniano	Creemos
3	Member	Luis Cristian Becerra Dúran	es:Alianza Unidos Por los Pueblos
3	Alternate	Tatiana Céspedes Salazar	es:Alianza Unidos Por los Pueblos
4	Member	Arminda Saucedo Ortiz	Creemos
4	Alternate	Vidal Bentura Rojas	Creemos
5	Member	Nicolás Chuviru Chuviru	TODOS
5	Alternate	Aida Condori Caylo	TODOS
Source: Supreme Electoral Tribunal.

== Population ==
Population pyramid 2024
%	Males	Age	Females	%
0.1		85+		0.2
0.2		80–84		0.2
0.6		75–79		0.4
0.8		70–74		0.5
1.1		65–69		0.9
1.8		60–64		1.1
2.1		55–59		1.5
2.6		50–54		1.8
2.9		45–49		2.4
3.4		40–44		2.8
3.7		35–39		3.3
4.3		30–34		4
4.4		25–29		4.6
3.9		20–24		4.2
4.5		15–19		4.6
5.4		10–14		5
5.9		5–9		5.3
5.1		0–4		4.3
- Source: 2024 Bolivian Census

The 2001 Census was the first held after the 1999 creation of the municipality. Since then, the municipality has grown by 51%.

Population in Recent Censuses
2001	2012	2024
5,660	7,490	8,541

=== Languages and Indigenous identification ===
San Ramón has a self-identified indigenous population of around 16%. A large majority of the population speak Spanish, but Quechua and Aymara speakers make up 9.5% of the population.

Ethnic identification (2024)
Group	Population	%
Chiquitano	763	8.9%
Campesino	329	3.9%
Quechua	297	3.5%
Source: 2024 Bolivian Census

Languages spoken
Language	2024 speakers	2024 %	2012 speakers	2012 %
Spanish	7,243	84.8%	5,449	72.8%
Quechua	495	5.8%	541	7.2%
Aymara	53	0.6%	94	1.3%
Source: 2024 Bolivian Census

== Poverty and basic services ==
San Ramón Municipality: Poverty and Basic Service Access
Location	Poverty (NBI)			Lack of Water Access			Lack of Sanitation Access		
	2012	2024	Change	2001	2024	Change	2001	2024	Change
San Ramón	67%	39%	▼ -29%	42%	4%	▼ -38%	90%	80%	▼ -10%
Santa Cruz	35%	21%	▼ -15%	13%	4%	▼ -9%	70%	41%	▼ -29%
Bolivia	45%	30%	▼ -15%	27%	13%	▼ -14%	59%	36%	▼ -22%
NBI indicates a Unsatisfied Basic Needs definition for poverty. Source: INE Bolivia, 2024 Bolivian Census
