= Piraí River (Bolivia) =

Coordinates: 18°11′14″S 63°33′34″W

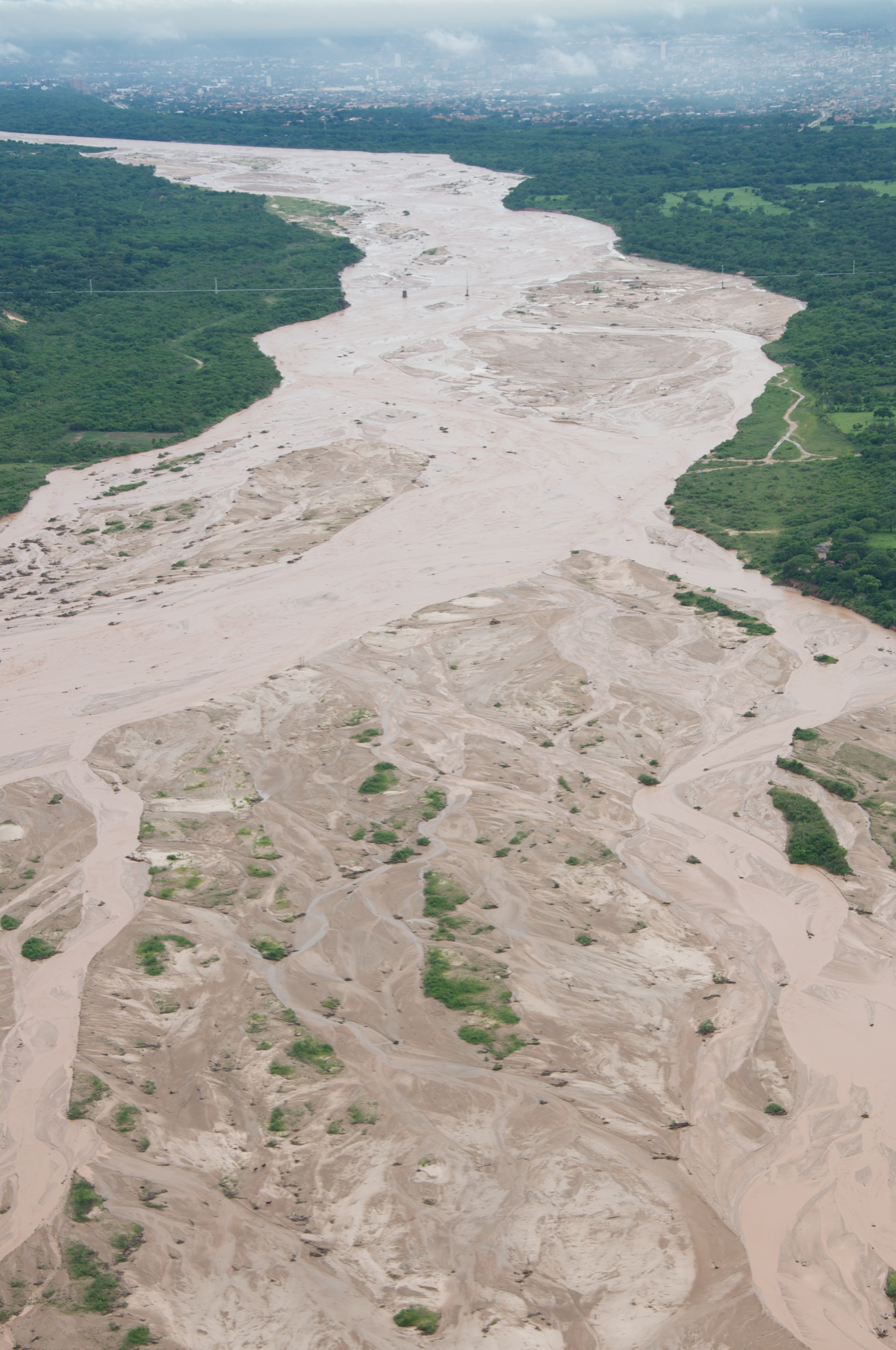

Location
- Country: Bolivia

Physical characteristics
- Source
  - location: near Quirusillas, Santa Cruz Department
- Mouth
  - location: Yapacani River

The Piraí River is a river of Bolivia. Santa Cruz de la Sierra, Bolivia's largest city by population, is located on this river. The Piraí is a major tributary of Yapacaní River.

== See also ==
- List of rivers of Bolivia
