= Santa Fe de Yapacaní =

Coordinates: 17.3972°S 63.8256°W

- Town
- Interactive map of Santa Fe de Yapacaní
- Country: Bolivia
- Time zone: UTC-4 (BOT)

Santa Fe de Yapacaní is a small town in Bolivia.
