= Immaculate Conception Cathedral, Concepción =

Immaculate Conception Cathedral
- Catedral de la Inmaculada Concepción
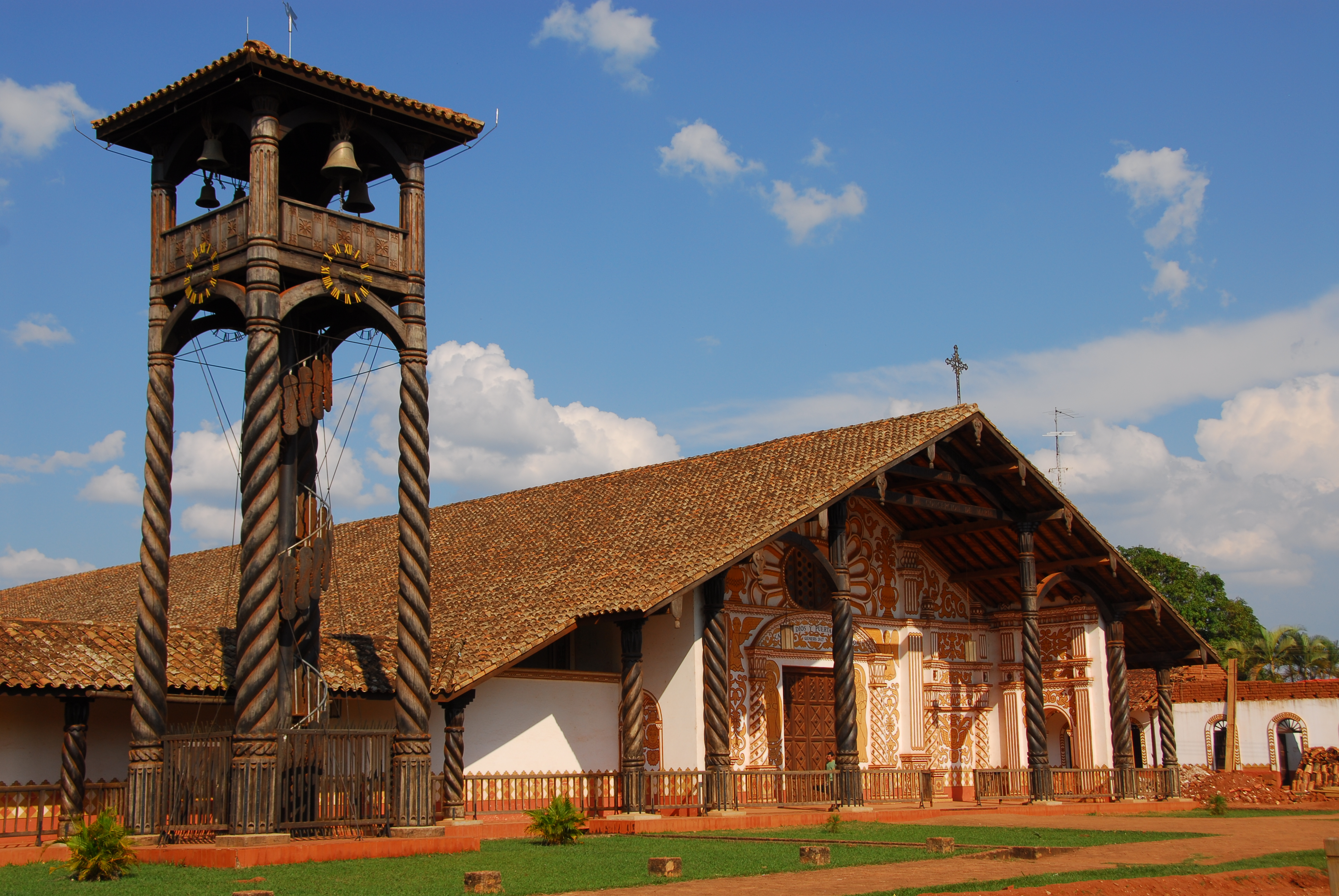
- Immaculate Conception Cathedral
- Location: Concepción
- Country: Bolivia
- Denomination: Roman Catholic Church

UNESCO World Heritage Site
- Type: Cultural
- Criteria: iv, v
- Designated: 1990
- Part of: Jesuit Missions of Chiquitos
- Reference no.: 529
- Region: Latin America and the Caribbean

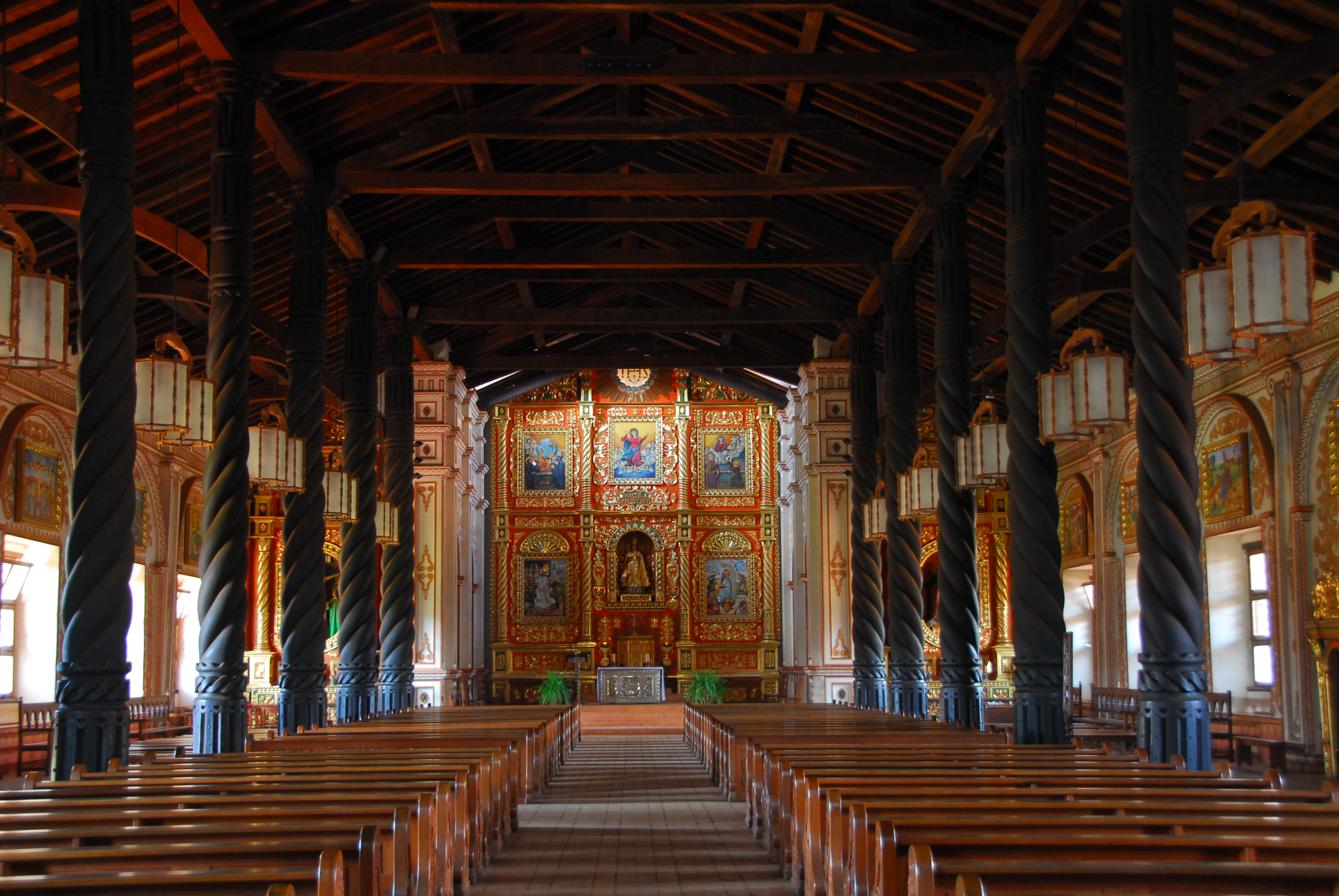
Interior view

The Immaculate Conception Cathedral (Spanish: Catedral de la Inmaculada Concepción) Also Concepción Cathedral Is the name that receives a religious building affiliated with the Catholic Church that is located in the city of Concepción in Santa Cruz Department, Bolivia.

The complex includes the cathedral the bell tower and the parochial house that were built by the Jesuits between 1753 and 1756. It was declared a national monument of Bolivia in 1950 and a World Heritage Site by Unesco in 1990.

== Administration ==
The temple follows the Roman or Latin rite and is the main church of the Apostolic Vicariate of Ñuflo de Chávez (Apostolicus Vicariatus Niuflensis) that was created in 1951 through the bull "Ne sacri Pastores" of Pope Pius XII.

It is under the pastoral responsibility of Bishop Bonifacio Antonio Reimann Panic.

== See also ==
- Roman Catholicism in Bolivia
- Immaculate Conception Cathedral
- List of Jesuit sites
