= Obispo Santistevan Province =

Province of Bolivia

Provincia Obispo Santistevan
- Province
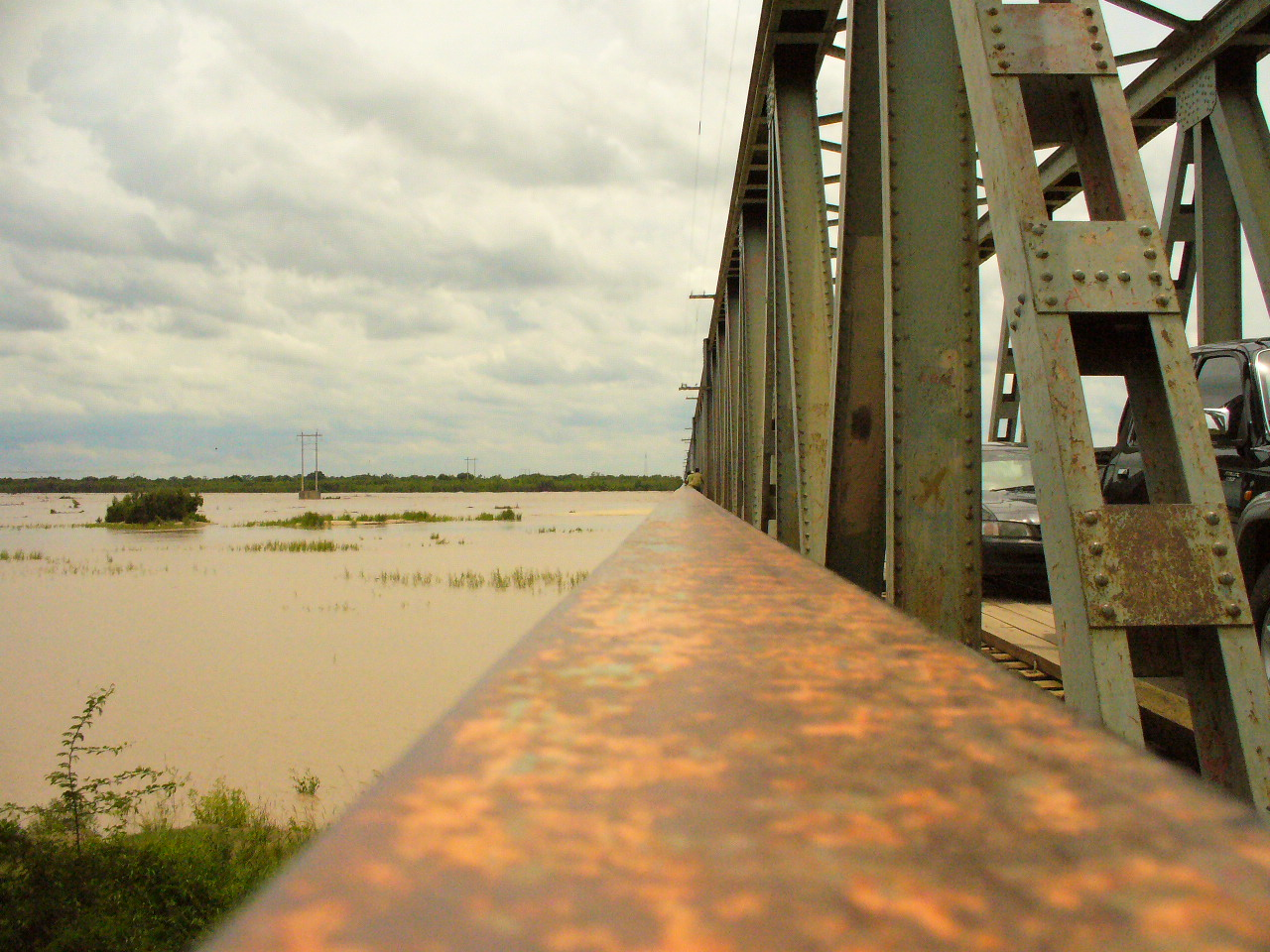
- Río Grande (or: Guapay)
- Interactive map of Provincia Obispo Santistevan
- Coordinates: 16°40′S 63°30′W
- Country: Bolivia
- Department: Santa Cruz
- Established: 2 December 1941

Area
  - Total: 3,673 km^{2} (1,418 sq mi)

Population (2024)
  - Total: 196,101
  - Density: 53.39/km^{2} (138.3/sq mi)
- ISO 3166 code: BO.SC.OS

Obispo Santistevan (or: Santiesteban) is one of the fifteen provinces of the Bolivian Santa Cruz department and is situated in the department's western parts. The province was founded on 2 December 1941, and its name honors Obispo Santistevan (1843–1931), famous supporter of the building of Santa Cruz Cathedral. Its capital is Montero.

== Location ==
Obispo Santistevan Province is located between 16° 02' and 17° 24' South and between 63° 02' and 64° 15' West. It extends over a length of 280 km from Northwest to Southeast, and up to 45 km from West to East. The province's border to the neighbouring provinces in the East and Northeast is formed by Río Grande.

The province is situated in the Bolivian lowlands and borders Ichilo Province in the Northwest, Sara Province in the Southwest, Ignacio Warnes Province in the Southeast, Ñuflo de Chávez Province in the East, and Guarayos Province in the Northeast.

== Population ==
The population of Obispo Santistevan Province has increased by 75% over the recent two decades:

- 1992: 104,660 inhabitants (census)
- 2001: 142,786 inhabitants (census)
- 2012: 181,198 inhabitants (census)
- 2024: 196,101 inhabitants (census)

At the 1992 census, 98.2% of the population spoke Spanish, 27.6% spoke Quechua, 1.9% spoke Aymara, and 1.2 spoke Guaraní. 35.5% of the population had no access to electricity and 34.2% had no sanitary facilities. 44.7% of the population were younger than 15 years old. 86.5% of the population were Catholics and 9.8% were Protestants.

== Division ==
The province comprises four municipios:

- Mineros Municipality - 45,853 inhabitants (2001)
- Montero Municipality - 80,341 inhabitants (2001)
- General Saavedra Municipality - 16,592 inhabitants (2001)
- Puerto Fernández Alonso - 15,117 inhabitants (2001)
