= Okinawa Uno =

City in Bolivia

Okinawa Uno Okinawa Uno
- Municipality
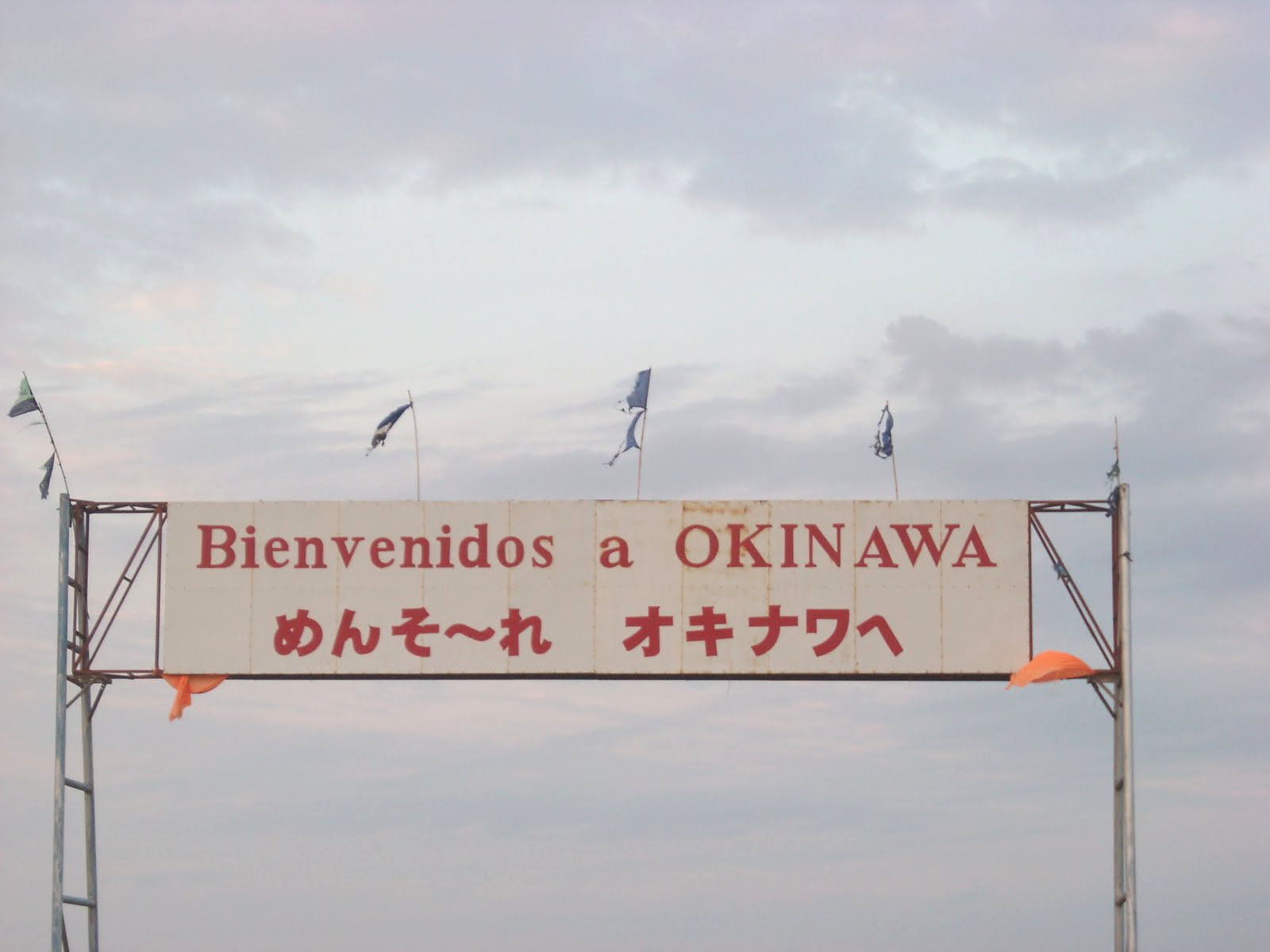
- Welcome sign to Okinawa Uno

- Location in Bolivia
- Coordinates: 17°13′08″S 62°53′43″W
- Country: Bolivia
- Department: Santa Cruz Department
- Province: Warnes

Government
  - Mayor: Rubén Darío Mercado Suárez

Area
  - Total: 1,037 km^{2} (400 sq mi)

Population (2024 census)
  - Total: 10,508
  - Density: 10.13/km^{2} (26.24/sq mi)
- Demonym: okinawense
- Time zone: UTC−04:00

Okinawa Uno, also called Colonia Okinawa or simply Okinawa, is a small city in Bolivia, located in the municipality of the same name, and in the Ignacio Warnes Province in the Santa Cruz Department. The town is between the Río Grande to the east and the Pailón River to the west.

== History ==
The town of Okinawa Uno was established by Okinawan immigrants after the end of the Second World War, and during its peak in the mid-1960s consisted of 565 families and over 3,000 Okinawans in total.

The municipality was established on 6 April 1991, separating it from Warnes Municipality.

== Demography ==
Year	Population	Source
2001	11,661	2001 Census
2012	12,482	2012 Census
2024	10,508	2024 census
Source: Instituto Nacional de Estadística (2025), Tabulados por Municipio/TIOC: Población (in Spanish), Wikidata Q139668018. Urban totals for Okinawa Uno municipality.

== See also ==
- Bolivia–Japan relations

== Sources ==
- Miyahira, Katsuyuki; Petrucci, Peter R. (2015). "Uchinaaguchi as an online symbolic resource within and across the Okinawan diaspora". In Heinrich, Patrick; Miyara, Shinsho; Shimoji, Michinori (eds.). Handbook of the Ryukyuan Languages. De Gruyter Mouton. pp. 553–573. doi:10.1515/9781614511151.553. ISBN 9781614511618.
- Suzuki, Taku (2010). Embodying Belonging: Racializing Okinawan Diaspora in Bolivia and Japan. Honolulu: University of Hawaiʻi Press. ISBN 9780824833442. JSTOR j.ctt6wqxfx.
