= Surutú River =

Coordinates: 17°24′35″S 63°50′33″W

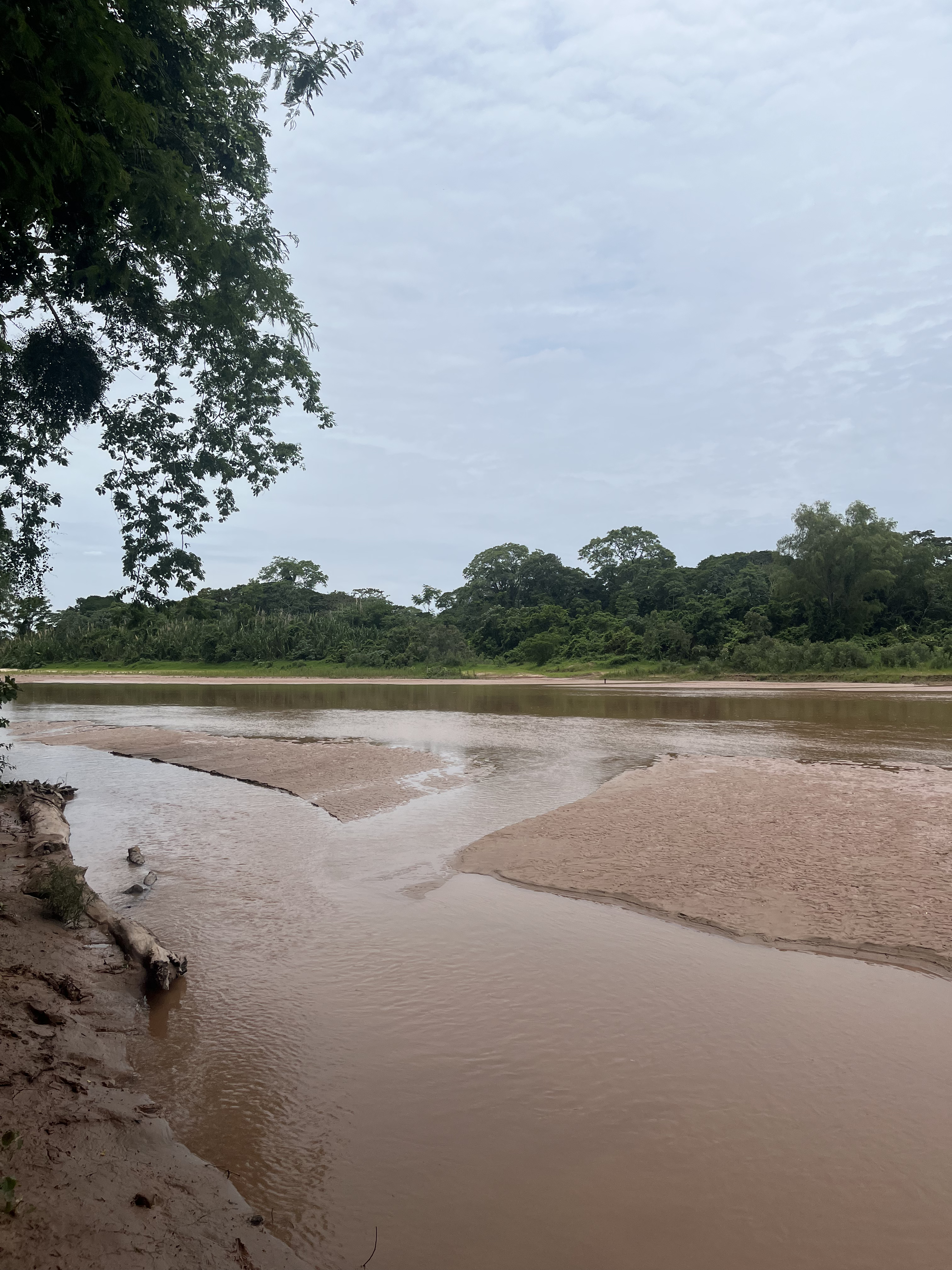

Location
- Country: Bolivia

The Surutú River is a river in the Santa Cruz Department in Bolivia.

== See also ==
- List of rivers of Bolivia
