= List of churches of the Jesuit Missions of Chaco =

These were the Jesuit Reductions in the Gran Chaco region in 1768 when the Jesuits were expelled.

- San José
- San Esteban
- Pilar
- Nuestra Señoar de Buen Concilio
- San Juan Bautista
- Rosario de las Salinas
- San Ignacio de Ledesma
- San Fernando
- San Jerónimo
- San Javier
- San Pedro
- Concepcíon
- Belén
- Rosario
- San Juan Nepomuceno

== See also ==
- List of churches of the Jesuit Missions of the Chiquitos
