= Hans Roth =

Hans Roth can refer to:

- Hans Roth (architect) (1934-1999), Swiss architect
- Hans Roth (gymnast) (born 1890), German gymnast
- Hans Roth (wrestler) (1903-1964), Swiss wrestler
