= List of churches of the Jesuit Missions of the Chiquitos =

This table provides an overview of the churches in the Jesuit Missions of the Chiquitos.

Settlement (Note: Missions that are part of the World Heritage site are in bold.)	Year of Construction	Architect	Status of Restoration	Picture
San José de Chiquitos	1745–1754	Unknown	Restored 1988-2003 by Roth, et al.	
San Rafael de Velasco	1747–1749	Martin Schmid	Restored 1972-96 by Roth, et al.	
San Javier	1749–1752	Martin Schmid	Restored 1988-2003 by Roth, et al.	
San Miguel de Velasco	1750–1757	Collaborator or pupil of Martin Schmid	Restored 1979–1983 by Roth, et al.	
Concepción	1753–1756	Martin Schmid, Fr. Johann Mesner	Restored 1975–1996 by Roth, et al.	
Santa Ana de Velasco	1770–1780	Unknown	Partially restored 1989–2001 by Roth, et al.	
San Ignacio de Velasco	?–1761 (destroyed in 1948)	Collaborator or pupil of Martin Schmid	Reconstructed 1964–1968; reconstructed 1992–2001 by Roth, et al.	
San Juan Bautista	1755–1759? (damaged by fire 1781, 1811)	Martin Schmid?	Ruins of tower remain	
Santiago de Chiquitos	1767 (destroyed mid-19th century)	Unknown	Reconstructed 1916–1920	
Santo Corazón	By 1769?	Unknown	Reconstructed	
