= Domenico Zipoli =

Italian composer (1688–1726)

- Born: 1688; Prato
- Died: 1726 (aged 37–38); Córdoba, Viceroyalty of Peru
- Occupations: Composer; Educator
- Organizations: Church of the Gesù, Rome; Church of Córdoba

Domenico Zipoli (1688–1726) was an Italian composer from the Baroque period who worked in Córdoba, in the Viceroyalty of Peru, Spanish Empire (in modern Argentina). He became a Jesuit in order to work in the Reductions of Paraguay where he taught music among the Guaraní people. He is remembered as the most accomplished musician among Jesuit missionaries.

== Early training and career ==
Zipoli was born in Prato, where he received elementary musical training. However, there are no records of him having entered the cathedral choir. In 1707, and with the patronage of Cosimo III, Grand Duke of Tuscany, he was a pupil of the organist Giovani Maria Casini in Florence. In 1708, he briefly studied under Alessandro Scarlatti in Naples, then Bologna and finally in Rome under Bernardo Pasquini. Two of his oratorios date to this early period: San Antonio di Padova (1712) and Santa Caterina, Virgine e martire (1714). Around 1715, he was made the organist of the Church of the Gesù (the mother church for the Society of Jesus), in Rome, a prestigious post. At the very beginning of the following year, he finished his best-known work, a collection of keyboard pieces titled Sonate d'intavolatura per organo e cimbalo.

== Jesuit musician-missionary ==
For reasons that are not clear, Zipoli travelled to Sevilla, Spain, in 1716, where, on 1 July, he joined the Society of Jesus with the desire to be sent to the Reductions of Paraguay in Spanish Colonial America. Still a novice, he left Spain with a group of 53 missionaries who reached Buenos Aires on 13 July 1717.

He completed his formation and sacerdotal studies in Córdoba (in contemporary Argentina) (1717–1724) though, for the lack of an available bishop, he could not be ordained priest. All through these few years he served as music director for the local Jesuit church. Soon his works came to be known in Lima, Peru. Struck by an unknown infectious disease, Zipoli died in the Jesuit house of Córdoba, on 2 January 1726. A previous theory placing his death in the ancient Jesuit church of Santa Catalina, in the hills of the Province of Córdoba, has now been discredited. His burial place has never been found.

== Legacy ==
Zipoli continues to be well-known today for his keyboard works; many of them are well within the abilities of beginning to intermediate players, and appear in most standard anthologies. His Italian compositions have always been known but in 1972 some of his South American church music was discovered in Chiquitos, Bolivia: two Masses, two psalm settings, three Office hymns, a Te Deum laudamus and other pieces. A Mass copied in Potosí, Bolivia in 1784, and preserved in Sucre, Bolivia, seems a local compilation based on the other two Masses. His dramatic music, including two complete oratorios and portions of a third one, is mostly gone. Three sections of the 'Mission opera' San Ignacio de Loyola – compiled by Martin Schmid in Chiquitos many years after Zipoli's death, and preserved almost complete in local sources – have been attributed to Zipoli.

== Media ==
Gavotte – b minor

Largo – b minor

Pastorale for Organ
