= Martin Schmid =

Swiss Jesuit, missionary, musician and architect (1694–1772)

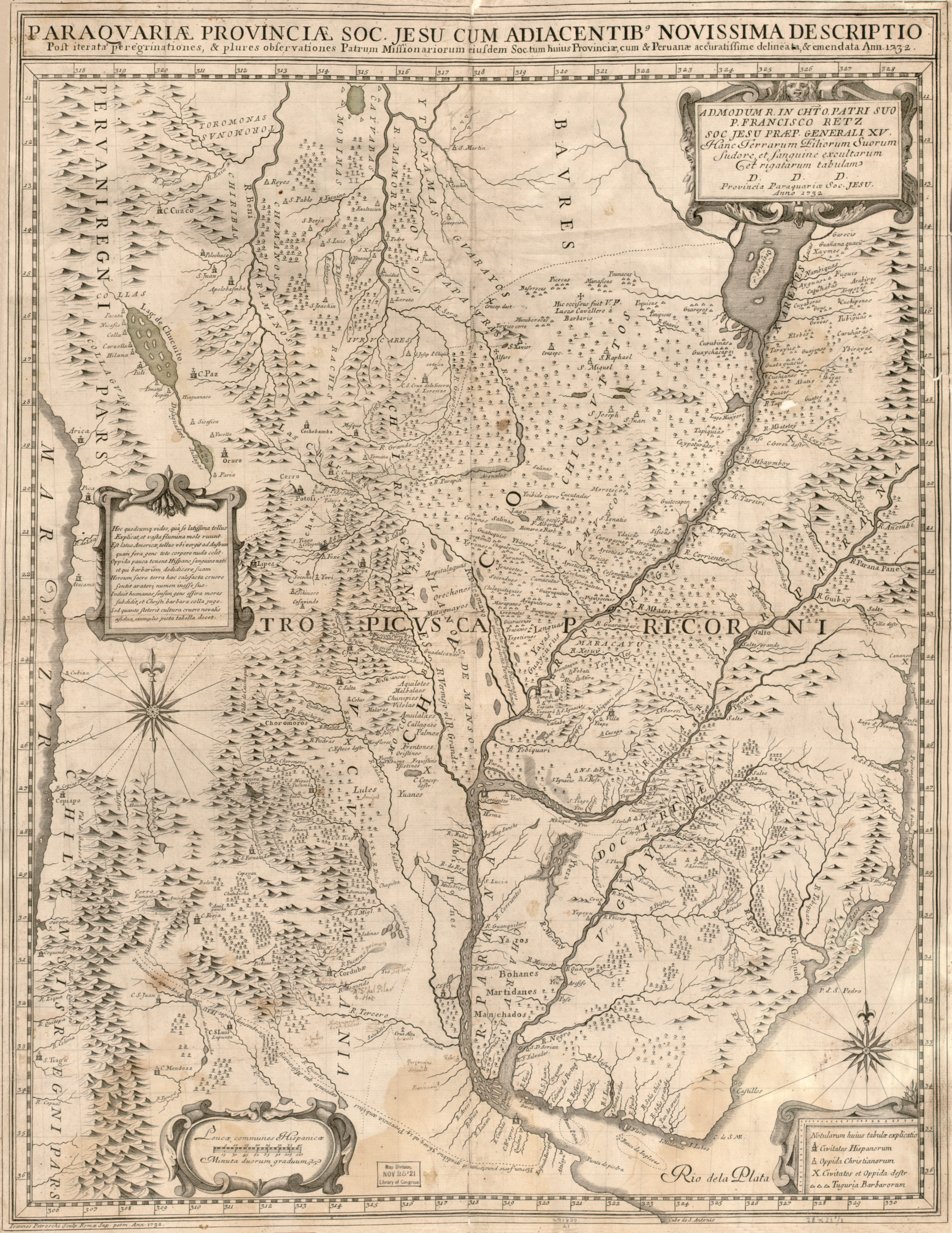
Map from 1732 depicting Paraguay and Chiquitos with missions

Martin Schmid, also known as Esmid (September 26, 1694 – March 10, 1772), was a Swiss Jesuit, missionary, musician and architect, who worked mainly in the Chiquitos Province of what is now Bolivia.

== Life ==
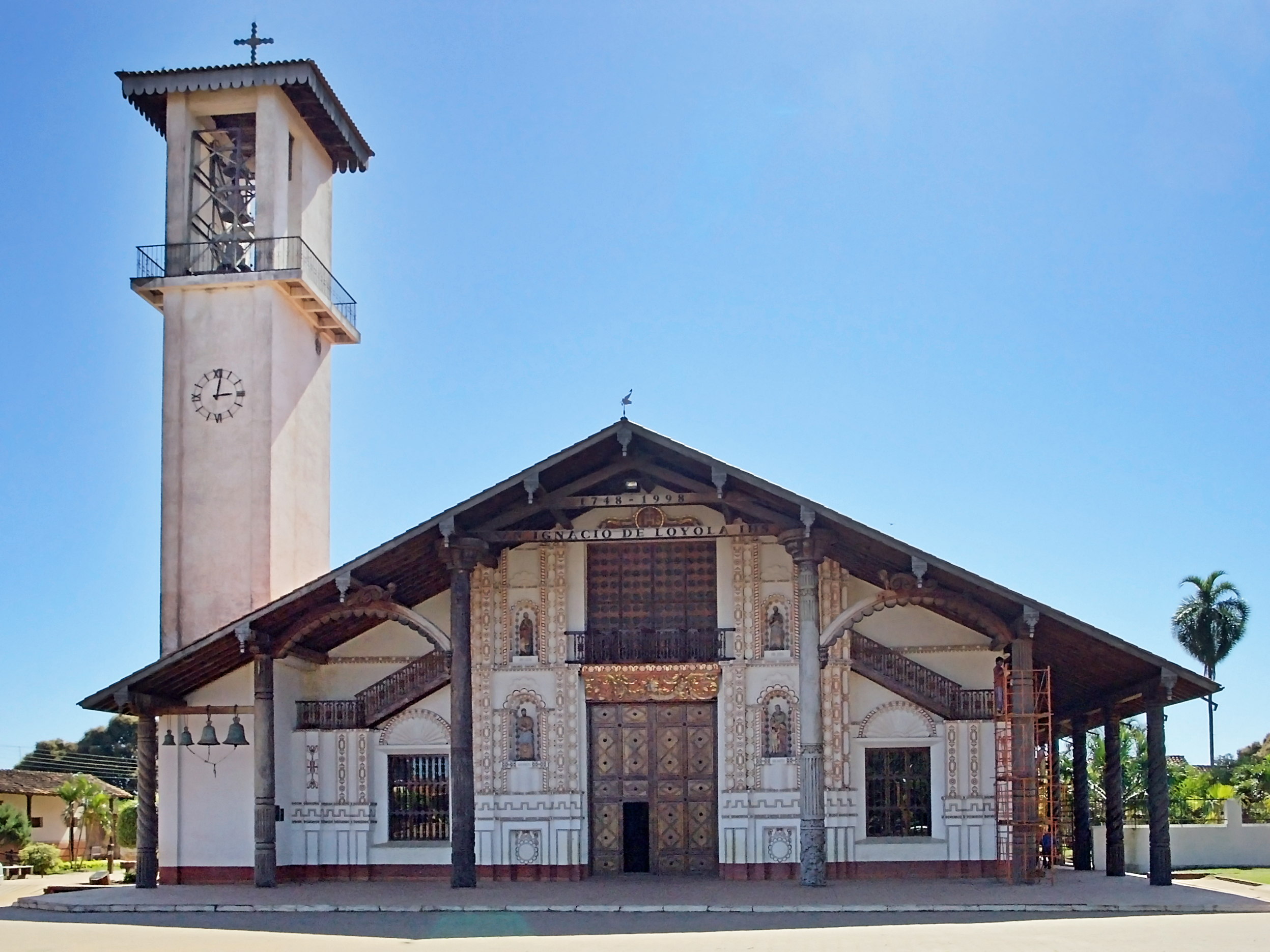
Kirche von San Ignacio de Velasco, Bolivia

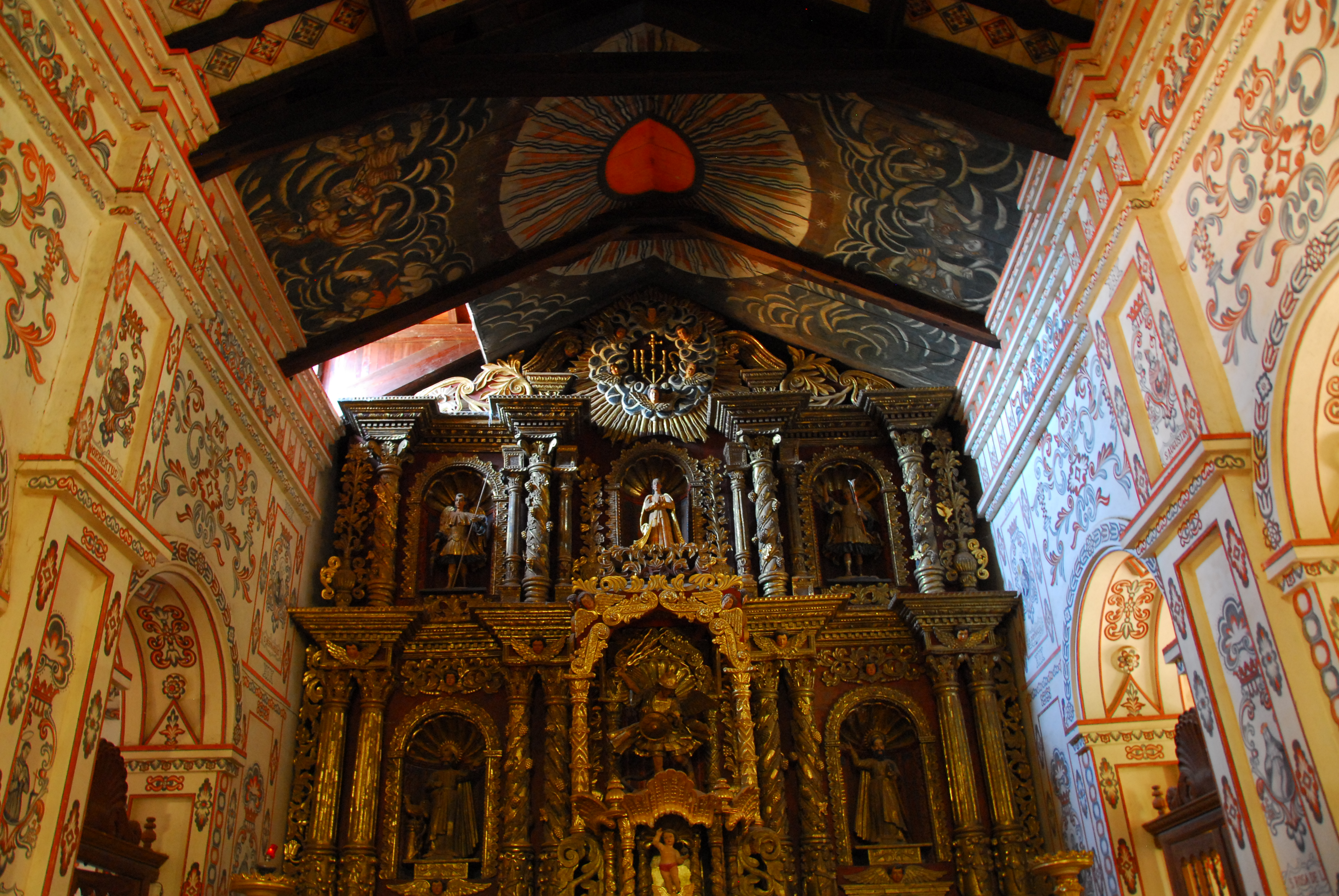
Altar in the Church of San Miguel de Velasco, Bolivia

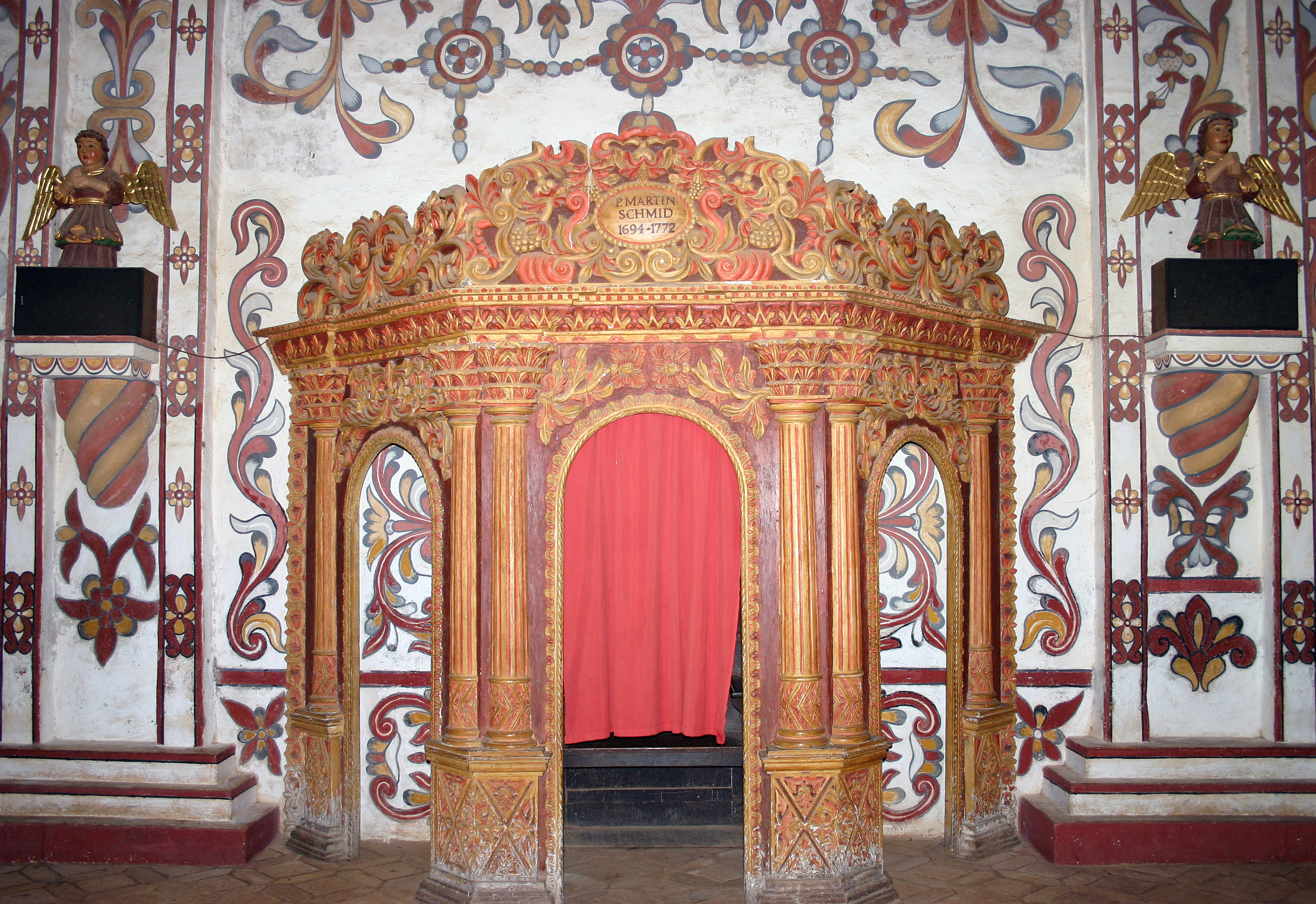
Confessional in the Church of San Miguel de Velasco, Bolivia; in memory of Martin Schmid

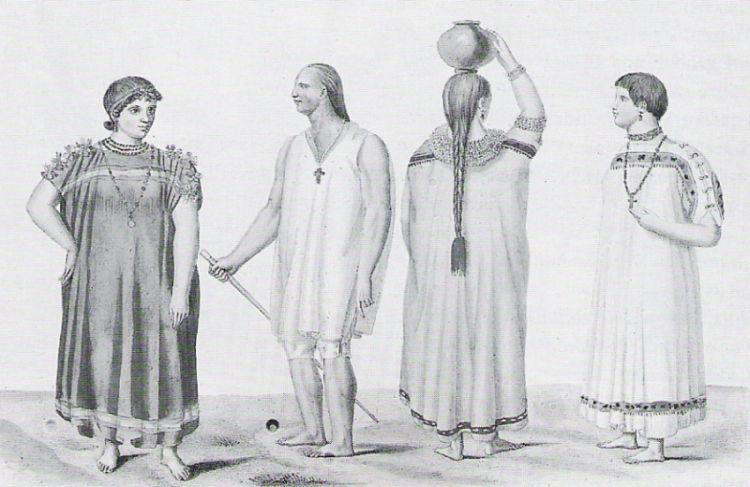
Baptized Chiquitos drawn by Alcide d'Orbigny 1831

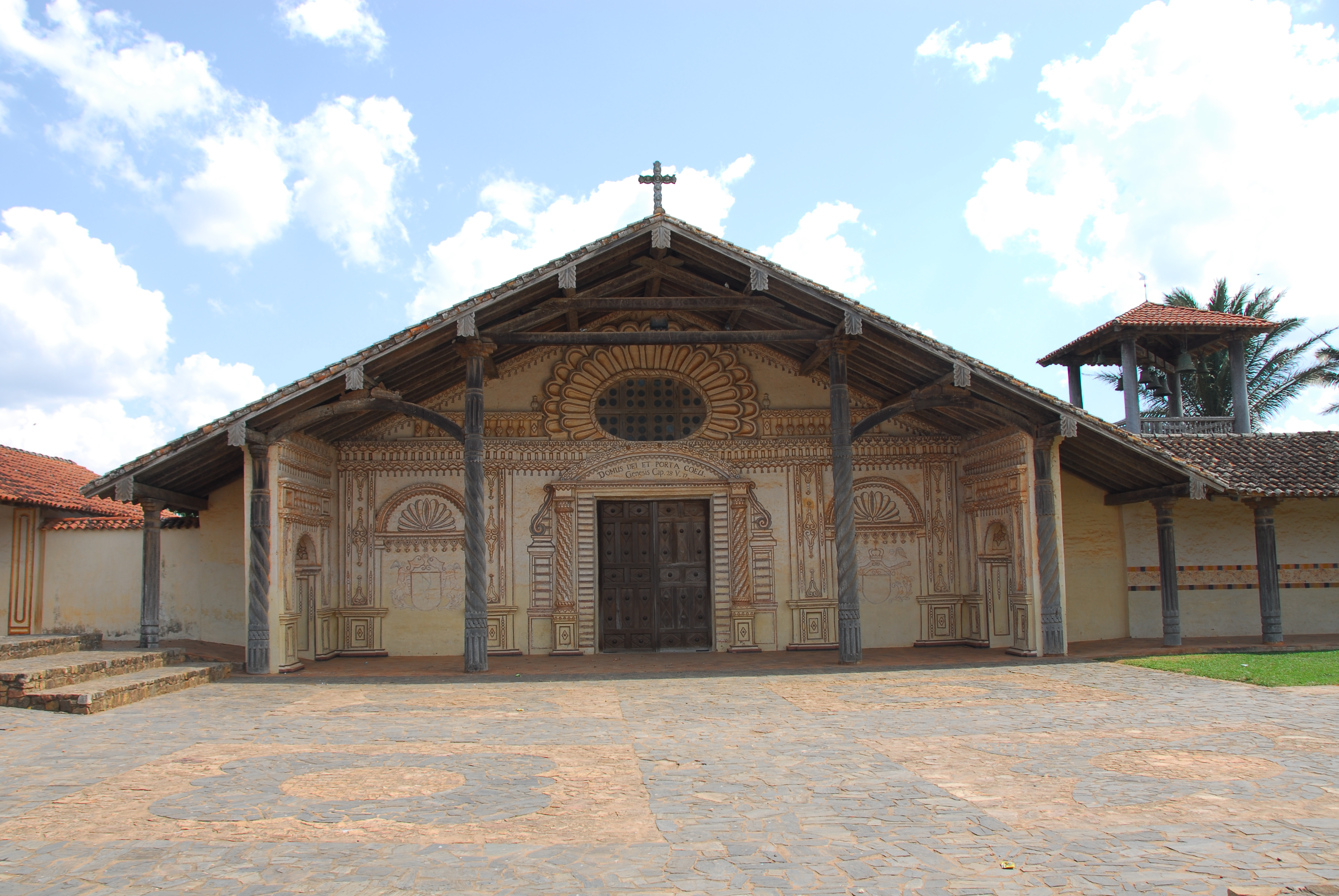
Front of the Church of San Javier, Bolivia

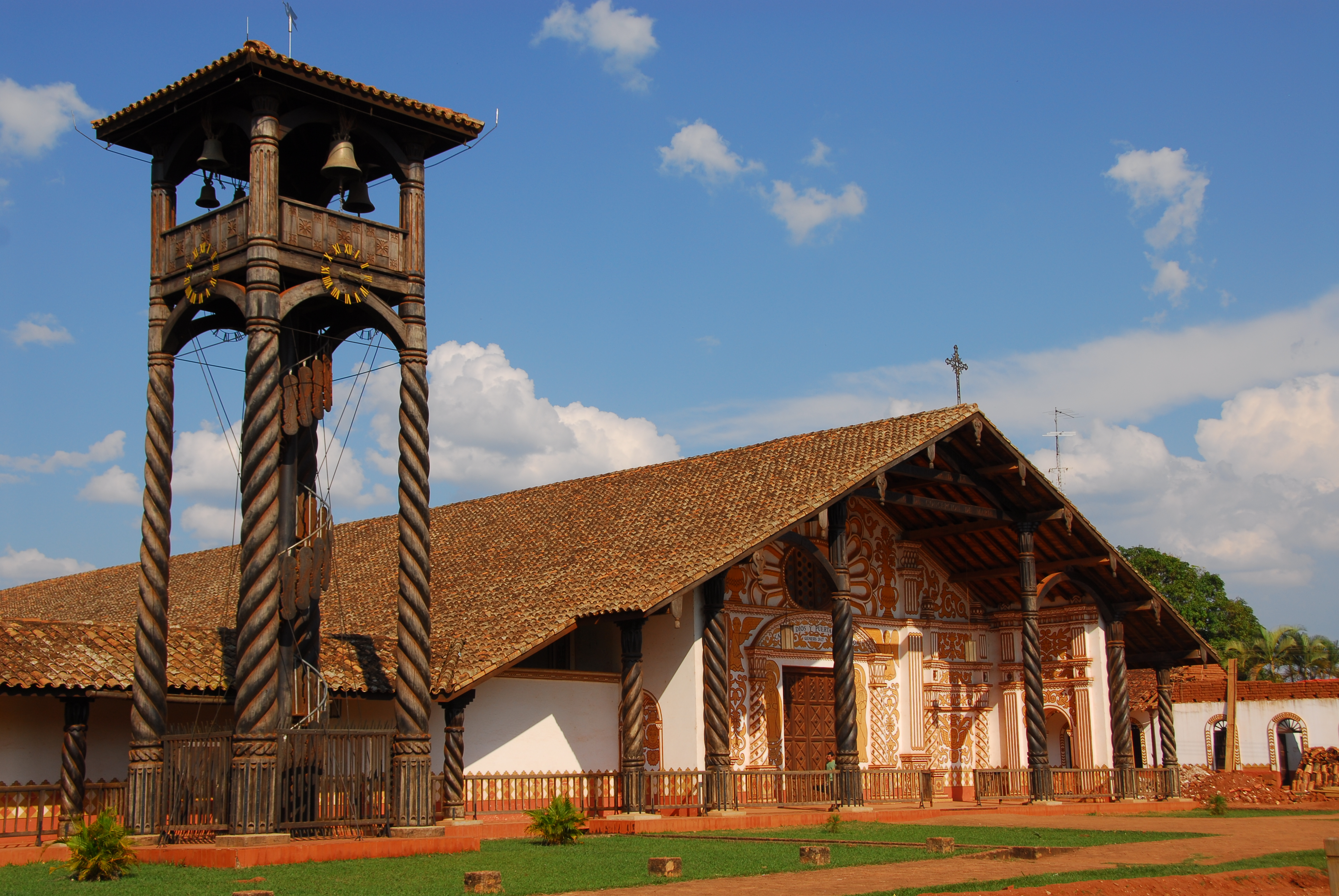
Church of Concepción, Bolivia

Martin Schmid was born in Baar, Switzerland. He was educated at the Jesuit College in Lucerne from 1710 to 1716. In 1717 he entered the Society of Jesus. His novitiate training was in Landsberg an der Lech, with subsequent theological studies in Hall in Tirol and in Ingolstadt in 1722. After he was ordained in 1726 Eichstätt to the priesthood, he obtained permission to travel as a missionary to Latin America. The trip was delayed by the Anglo-Spanish War forcing him to remain in Seville. While he was there, he improved his Spanish. At the same time, he helped to translate the history of the tribe of the Chiquitos of Juan Patricio Fernández into the German language - Erbauliche und angenehme Geschichte der Chiquitos, und andrer... neu-bekehrten Völcker, Vienna 1729, which translates as An Edifying and Enjoyable History of the Chiquitos, and of Other...Newly-converted People.

At the end of 1728 his journey to South America commenced. The crossing from Tenerife to Buenos Aires took more than three months. The missionaries needed eight more months to go inland and reach Potosí, Bolivia. Here Schmid was selected, along with three other Jesuits, to evangelize the Chiquitos. In August 1730, he finally reached the mission area of the Chiquitos.

=== At the Chiquitos ===
Schmid spent his first ten years between 1730 and 1740 in San Javier, Bolivia, part of the Jesuit Missions of Chiquitos. These missions featured houses for the natives spaced along three sides of a rectangle; the fourth side contained the church, workshops and schools. The churches were based upon European architecture adapted to local conditions. Besides his work as a priest, he began to build a music school. He taught the indigenous people to recreate European musical instruments. He also helped to establish a variety of workshops, and introduced several crafts which laid the foundations of later construction activities. In 1744, he sent his first letter home from the Jesuit Reductions settlement of San Rafael de Velasco. Here Schmid established the first of his jungle churches. In 1749 he returned to San Javier, to try to establish a similar church. In 1752 he undertook the construction of the church in Concepción, Bolivia. In other mission villages in the Chiquitanía region additional structures were built under his leadership. Wood-carved baroque altars were created in San Miguel de Velasco and San Ignacio de Velasco. How much involvement Schmid or his staff had in the preparation and decoration of the other churches in the ten villages of Jesuit Missions of the Chiquitos, is uncertain.

=== Missionary methods ===
When Martin Schmid set out to the mission fields, his primary intention was to evangelize the indigenous peoples. However his congregation had other tasks for him. His main job was to strengthen the faith of the already Christianized, indigenous individuals and to make their settlements sustainable. The roots of Christian belief were deepened by means of religious education and church celebrations. The Jesuit missionaries felt that this connection succeeded better if more emphasis was placed on the enhancement of liturgical celebrations, as a means of inspiration. For this reason, the music that was loved by the Indians was promoted, and the decoration of the church premises was done in an imposing manner.During the early years building churches and giving music lessons were Schmid's main fields of activity. Within his field of engagement he was also responsible for spreading the making of handicrafts. For the church construction he trained indigenous artisans. As part of his music lessons he taught the indigenous locals to construct European musical instruments.

Later, Schmid moved to San Juan Bautista (Santa Cruz) and had the opportunity to engage in direct proselytizing. In a letter to his brother, he described how this was practiced. In the village of San Juan there were already about three hundred Christianized, Indios. They were sent into the jungle to seek nomadic Indians and to persuade them to come to the Jesuit mission. Schmid writes that the villagers who were sent out actually returned after two months with more than a hundred "unbaptized souls." These were then accompanied to the church with music and singing. Schmid first provided them all with simple clothing to hide their nakedness. After that, they were offered food and supplied with small gifts such as: glass beads, rosaries, knives, scissors, etc. The next day the children were baptized. The priests waited to baptise the adults as they first needed to be taught the Christian doctrine.

The superiors have ordered me to introduce the music in these missions. All villages now have their organ, many violins and double bass made of cedar, clavicordio, spinets, harps, trumpets, shawm. These Indian boys are foregone musicians; with their singing and playing in the Holy Mass they pay every day the own Thanks and Praise to the Lord. I must say that they could appear with their music in every town and church to your great surprise. (From a letter by Martin Schmid in 1744.)

=== Return ===
Schmid spent his last years in San Miguel de Velasco and in San Ignacio de Velasco, where he was, along with his fellow brother Johann Mesner (1703–68), entrusted with manufacturing and gilding the altars. In 1767, the Jesuits of San Ignacio received an order of expulsion by King Charles III of Spain. The 73-year-old Schmid was hoping he would not be affected by the eviction because of his age. Nonetheless, in 1768 he had to start the arduous journey home. With other deportees he crossed the Andes up to Arica, Chile, by mule. From there he traveled by boat, via Lima, to Panama. He then proceeded via Cartagena, Colombia, to Havana, and finally reached Cádiz, Spain in 1769. After a 15-month detention in El Puerto de Santa María he was allowed to leave Spain. In mid-November 1770 he arrived in Augsburg. In the spring of 1771, Schmid returned to his home in Switzerland. He spent more than one year at the Jesuit College of Lucerne. He died there aged 77, and was buried at the Jesuit Church of Lucerne.

== Effect ==
Besides his work as a missionary, Martin Schmid made a significant contribution to the enculturation of the Chiquitos Indians. With the introduction of European music, and the manufacturing of musical instruments, he has had a major, long-term influence on their musical culture. He may have helped to impart knowledge of craftsmanship and agriculture. With the creation of a dictionary, he contributed to the writing system and the conservation of the Chiquitano language. However, arguably his most enduring achievements were his churches and their interior decoration.

These churches, and the churches of his students, in: San Javier, Concepción, Santa Ana de Velasco, San Miguel de Velasco, San Rafael de Velasco, and San José were listed by the UNESCO as World Heritage Sites in 1990.

With his letters Schmid left a cultural history heritage.
