= Hans Roth (architect) =

Swiss architect

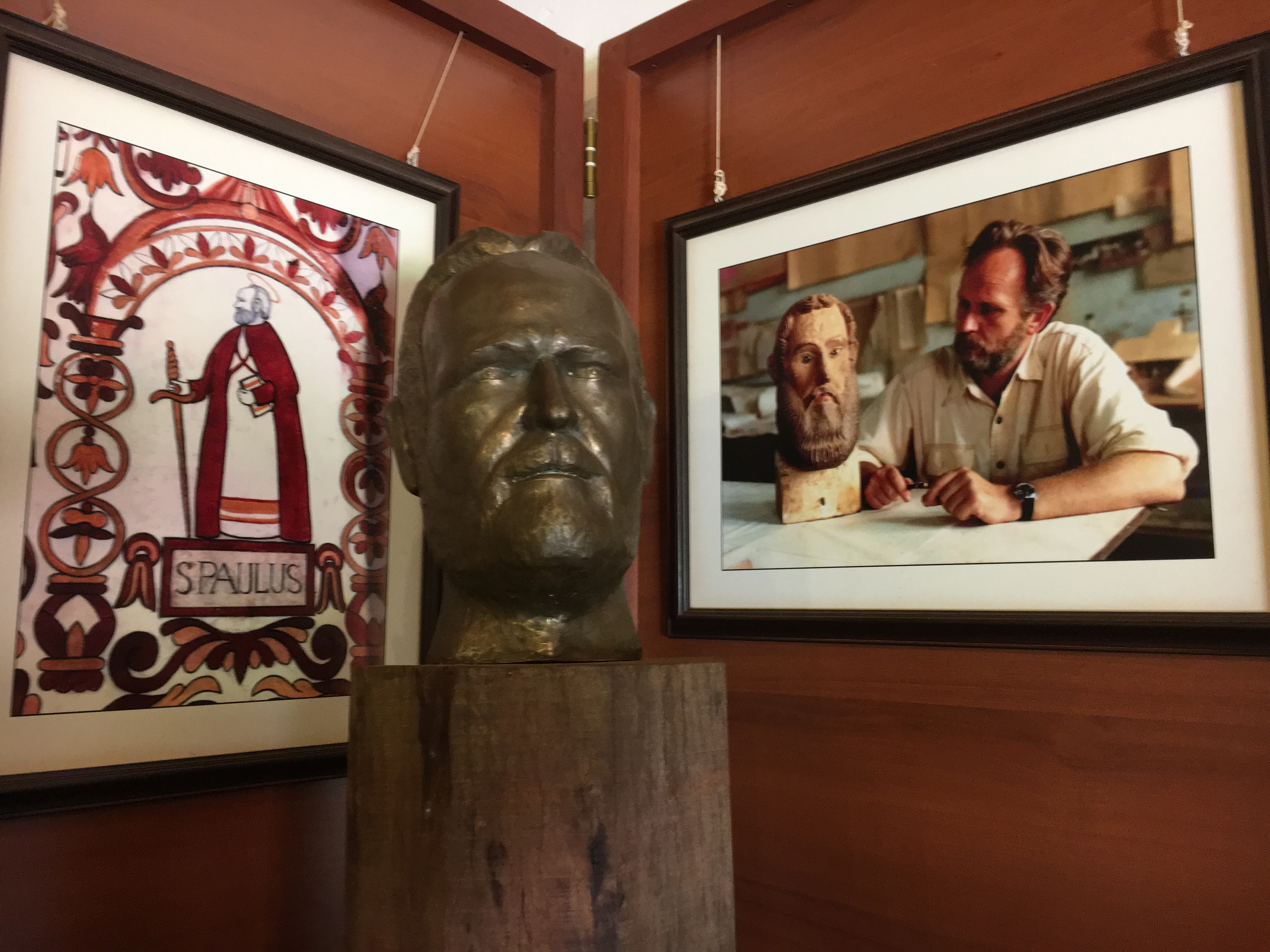
Tribute to the Swiss architect in the Hall that bears his name at the Mission Museum of Concepción, Bolivia

Hans Roth (July 26, 1934 – August 16, 1999) was a Swiss architect known for his extensive restoration work on the Jesuit mission churches in the Chiquitos region of Bolivia.

Hans Roth was born in Zürich, Switzerland in 1934. He pursued his studies in architecture.

In 1972, Roth embarked on what was initially a six-month project to restore the Jesuit mission churches in Chiquitos. This project ultimately spanned nearly three decades, ending with his death in 1999.
