= Vocabulário na língua brasílica =

Document on the Tupi language in the 16th century

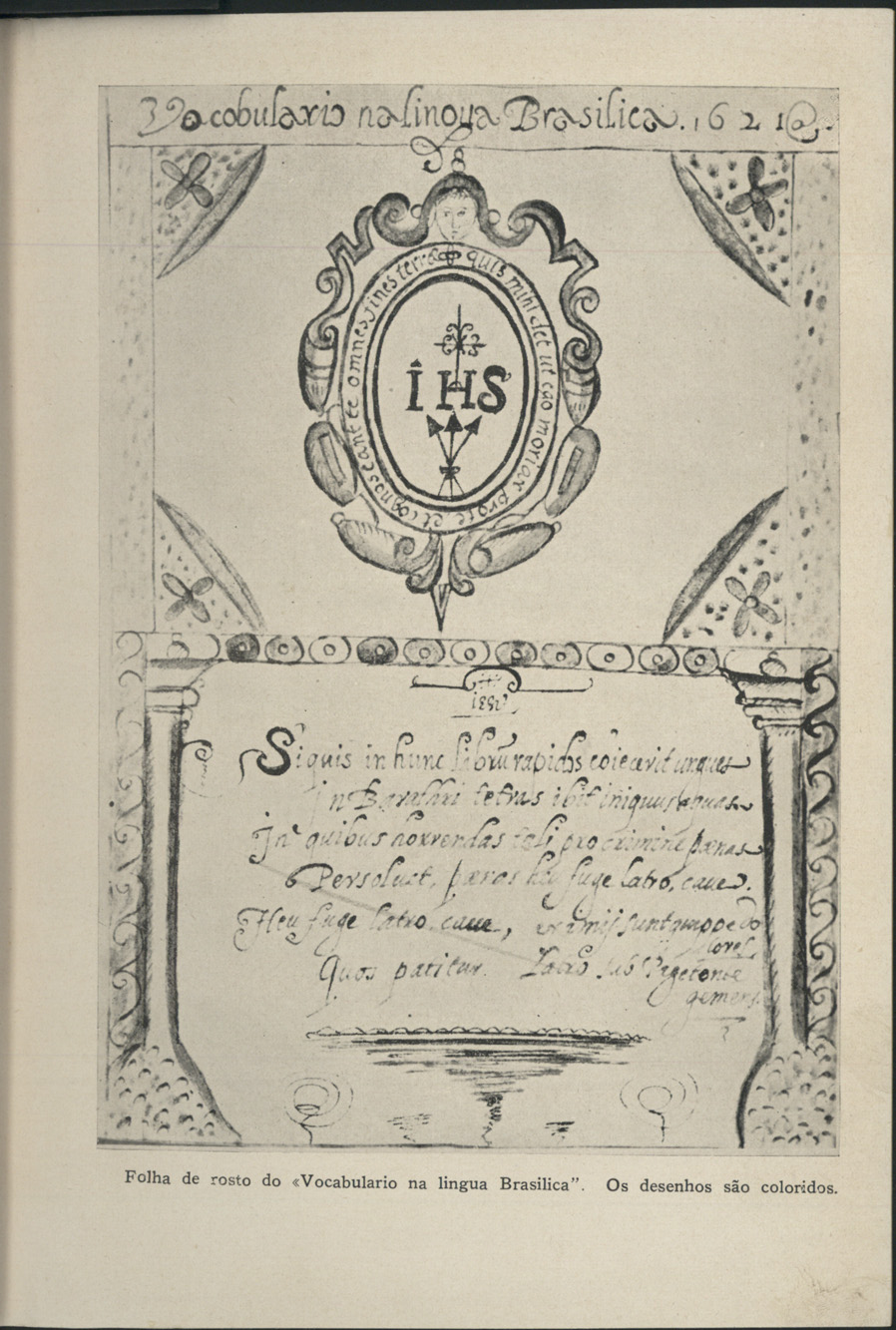
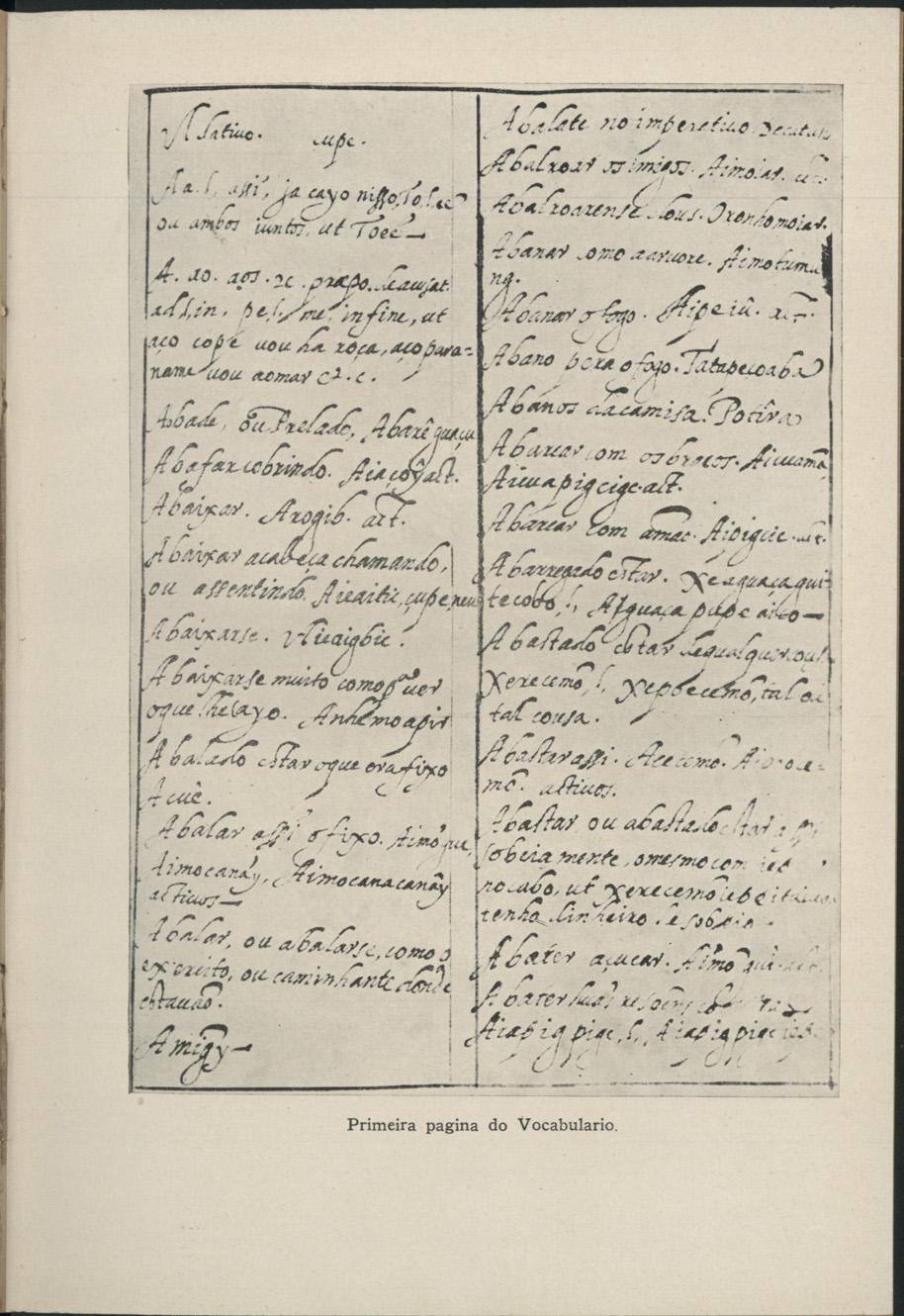
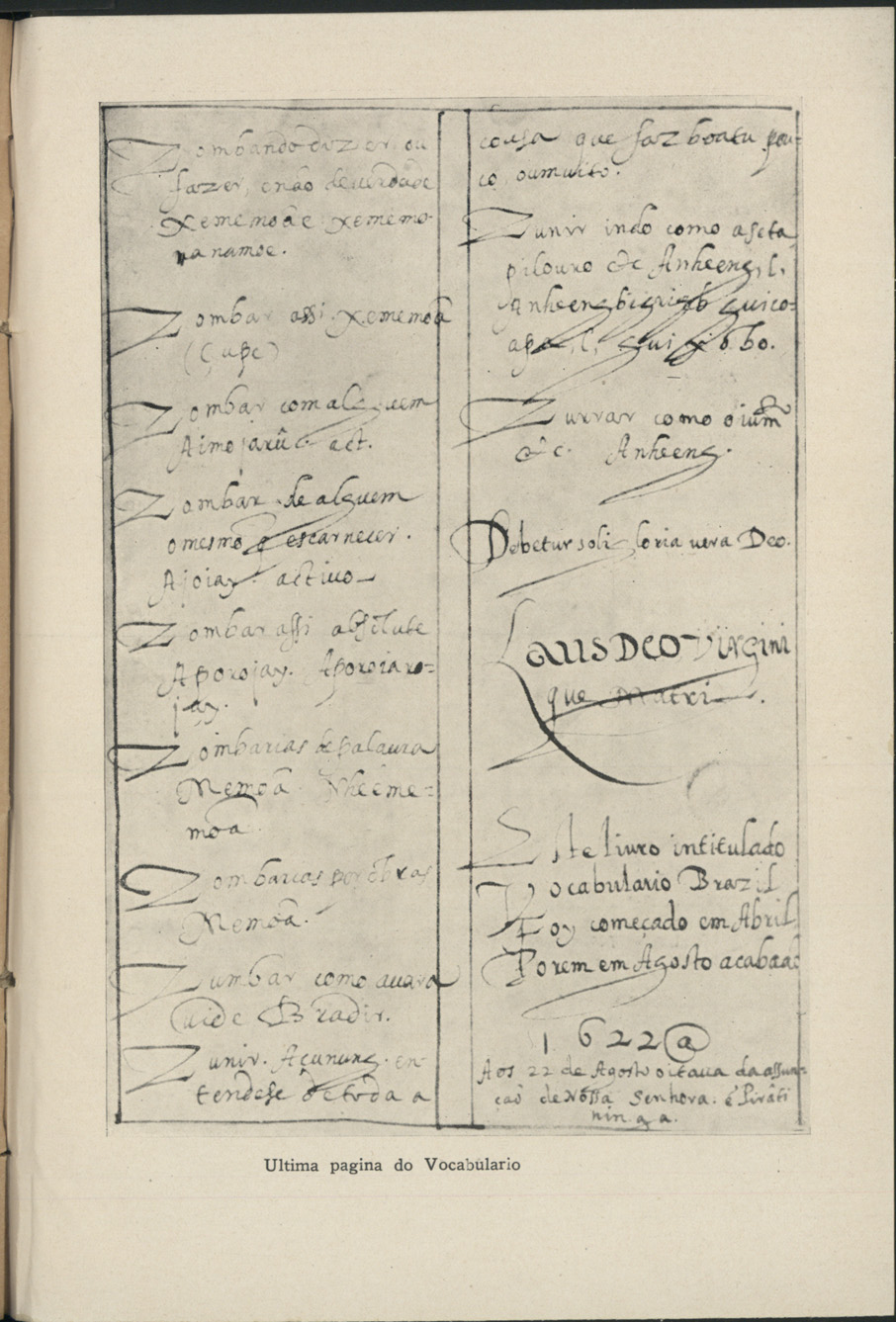
Title page, first page, and last page of Vocabulário na língua brasílica

Vocabulário na língua brasílica (lit. 'vocabulary in the Brazilian language') is a document on the Tupi language in the 16th century. According to Serafim Leite, its author was Leonardo do Vale, who died in 1591. For Eduardo de Almeida Navarro, the publication of the work three centuries later marked the emergence of Tupinology, as it made it possible to understand the differences between Tupi and the General Languages. According to Antônio Lemos Barbosa, although it is older than Antonio Ruiz de Montoya's Tesoro de la lengua guaraní and richer in ethnological information, Vocabulário na língua brasílica is inferior to it in size and in other respects.

== Bibliography ==
- Barbosa, Antônio Lemos (1948). O "Vocabulario na Lingua Brasilica" [The "Vocabulary in the Brazilian Language"] (in Portuguese). Rio de Janeiro: Ministério da Educação e Saúde. Archived from the original on 14 August 2025.
- Navarro, Eduardo de Almeida (2017). ""Tupi or not tupi" – A identidade indígena do Brasil". Revista Brasileira (91). Archived from the original on 27 March 2023.
