= Compêndio da doutrina cristã na língua portuguesa e brasílica =

1687 book by John Philip Bettendorff

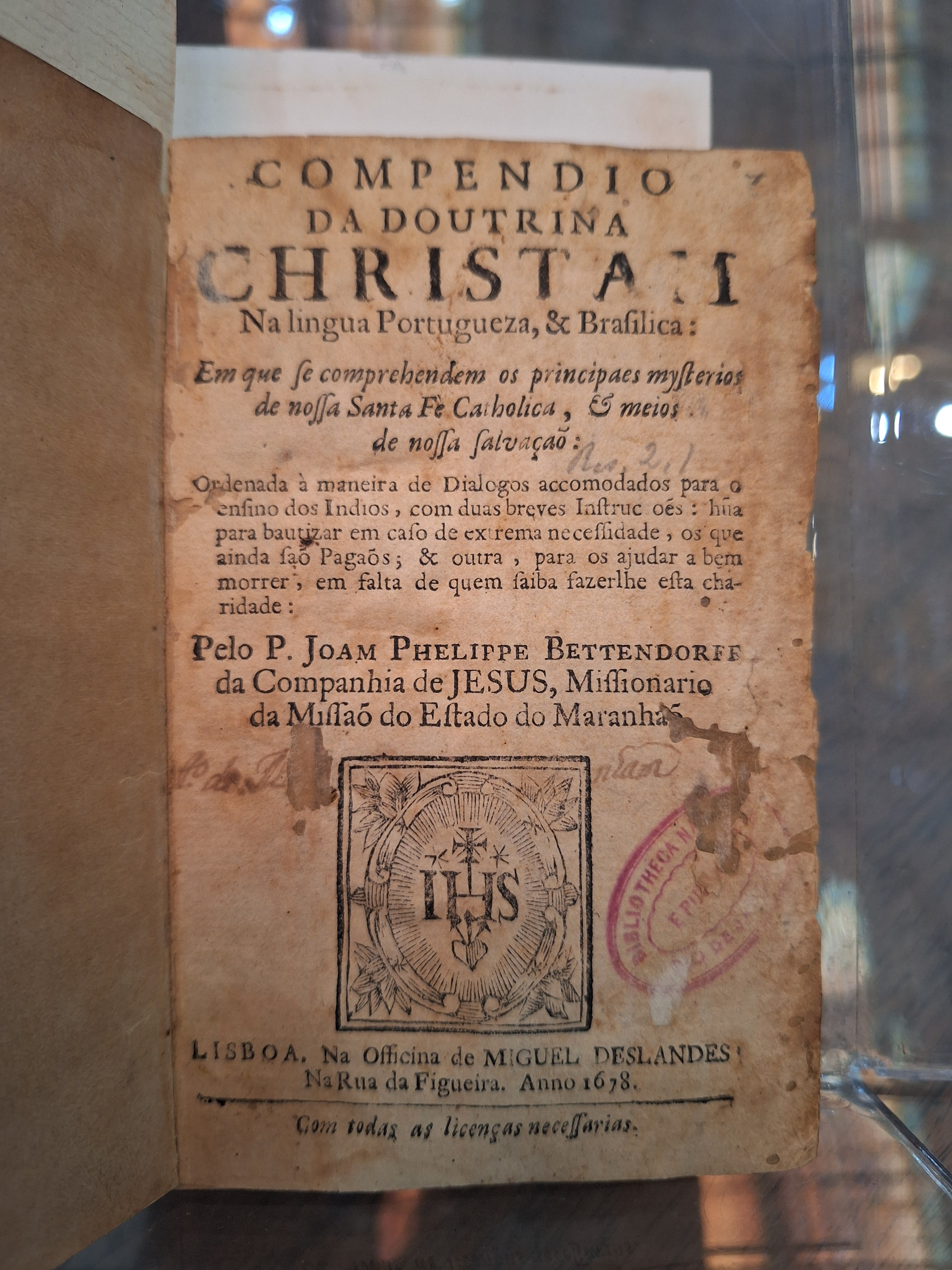
Title page of the 1687 edition; according to Serafim Leite, the exact year of printing is this one, and not 1678, as recorded on the cover.

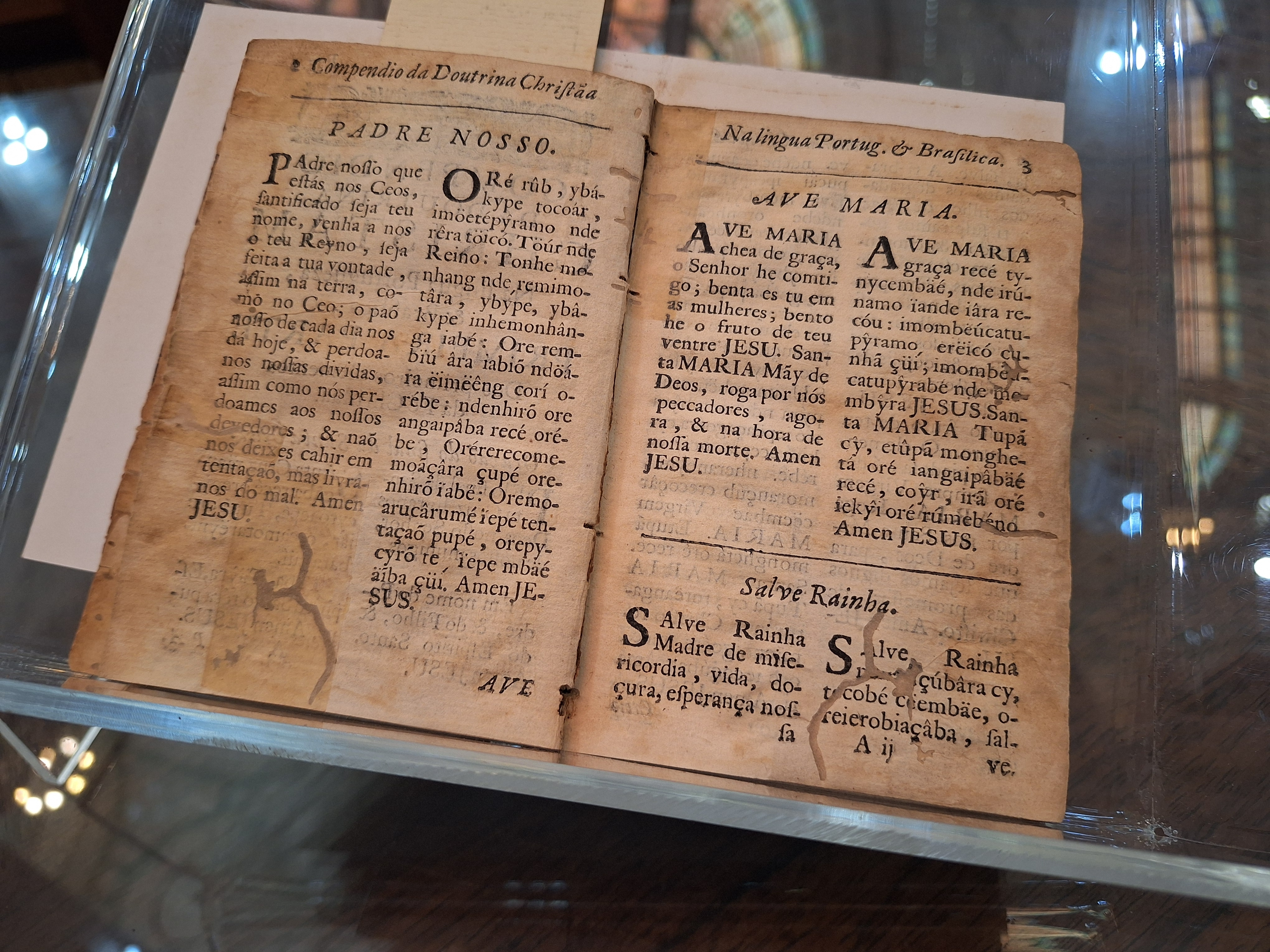
Open book with the Lord's Prayer, the Hail Mary, and the beginning of the Salve Regina, in Portuguese and Tupi

Compêndio da doutrina cristã na língua portuguesa e brasílica (lit. 'compendium of the Christian doctrine in the Portuguese and Brazilian language') is a catechism by John Philip Bettendorff, published in 1687 in the city of Lisbon. It was the last book in the Old Tupi language printed by the Society of Jesus in the Brazilian colonial period and the first whose author was an active Jesuit in the Amazon. It had a second edition printed in 1800, reissued also in Lisbon, by José Mariano da Conceição Veloso.

It has been regarded as the most inaccessible of the Tupi works printed by the Jesuits in the 16th and 17th centuries; the only Tupinologist who had access to the first edition was Antônio Lemos Barbosa. Two copies of this first edition are known, one in the National Library Foundation of Rio de Janeiro (Note: Available firsthand on Wikimedia Commons through this category since April 2025) and another in the National Library of Spain.

The Tupi found in Bettendorff 's Compêndio appears slightly altered, showing constructions that are incompatible with the teachings of Joseph of Anchieta and Luís Figueira. Lemos Barbosa suggests this may reflect a natural evolution of the language and notes Tupi "subordinate conjugation" was going through a period of confusion at the time. However, he also acknowledges the possibility of error on Bettendorff 's part, stating that the author of the Compêndio "did not have complete mastery of the language", and that some of his constructions should therefore be regarded as mistakes rather than evidence of linguistic evolution.

== Bibliography ==
- Arenz, Karl; Barros, Cândida; Gauz, Valeria (2019). "Um Catecismo Amazônico" [An Amazonian Catechism]. Anthropos (in Portuguese). 114 (1). JSTOR 26790644.
- Lemos Barbosa, Antônio (1956). Curso de tupi antigo: gramática, exercícios, textos [Course of Old Tupi: grammar, exercises, texts] (in Portuguese). Rio de Janeiro: Livraria São José. Archived from the original on 24 May 2025.
