= Dictionary of Old Tupi =

2013 dictionary by Eduardo de Almeida Navarro

- Author: Eduardo de Almeida Navarro
- Original title: Dicionário de Tupi Antigo
- Illustrator: Célio Cardoso
- Language: Portuguese
- Subject: Tupi language
- Genre: dictionary
- Published: 2013 (Portuguese)
- Publisher: Global Editora
- Publication place: Brazil
- Pages: 620
- ISBN: 9788526019331

The Dictionary of Old Tupi: The Classical Indigenous Language of Brazil (Portuguese: Dicionário de tupi antigo: a língua indígena clássica do Brasil) is a dictionary of the Tupi language which was compiled by the Brazilian lexicographer and philologist Eduardo de Almeida Navarro and published (in Portuguese only) in 2013. The work was conceived with the goal of spreading knowledge of the Tupi language to a broader public.

Divided into three parts, it starts with a Portuguese–Tupi vocabulary. The second part is the Tupi–Portuguese dictionary itself, containing nearly eight thousand entry words (or lexemes), making it the most complete Tupi dictionary ever compiled to date. The third part includes a list of two thousand words from Brazilian Portuguese that have their origins in Tupi (mostly place and city names).

As Old Tupi is a dead language, the dictionary has a philological approach. It was based on old texts rather than native speakers, making it a historical dictionary. The entry words were extracted from texts written in the 16th and 17th centuries. The purpose of this limitation is to avoid mixing Old Tupi with its historical developments, such as the Nheengatu language.

Navarro obtained his habilitation degree in 2006 with this dictionary, which he continued to refine until its publication by Global Editora in São Paulo in 2013, the same year he became a full professor at USP. The author states that the creation of the dictionary was necessary for him to complete his translation of the Camarão Indians' letters.

== Content and creation of the work ==
The dictionary is divided into three parts. Besides the introduction and preface by Ariano Suassuna, they are as follows:

- Portuguese–Tupi vocabulary
- Tupi–Portuguese dictionary
- Etymologies of toponyms and anthroponyms of Tupi origin in Brazilian Portuguese, and other tupinisms

The first part is a simple Portuguese-Tupi vocabulary. It presents only the words and their translations, without explanations or further details. The second part is the actual dictionary. Throughout the book, Navarro chose to update the spelling used in the primary sources. Thus, qu was replaced by k, and ig was spelled as y. The third part of the book is not exhaustive. Navarro stated that a future work should cover a much larger number of Tupinisms and names of Tupi origin in contemporary Portuguese.

=== Primary sources used ===
According to Navarro, many scattered and inaccessible pieces of information about the Tupi language were gathered and analyzed. Only works written or published in the 16th and 17th centuries were used. In the latter century, Old Tupi ceased to be spoken, and it is where its last documents can be found. Despite its antiquity, Old Tupi is the best-known indigenous Brazilian language.

Some of the most important works used as sources were, among many others:

- Catecismo na Língua Brasílica (Catechism in the Brasílica Language) by Antônio de Araújo
- Camarão Indians' letters
- True History: An Account of Cannibal Captivity in Brazil by Hans Staden
- Historia Naturalis Brasiliae (The Natural History of Brazil) by Marcgrave – this work helped collect the names of animals and plants in Tupi.

== History ==
Other dictionaries and vocabularies of Tupi were published before Navarro's dictionary. Navarro affirms that, until the publication of Vocabulário na Língua Brasílica (Vocabulary in the Brazilian Language) by Plínio Ayrosa in 1938, the lexicon of Old Tupi was practically unknown. Therefore, any dictionary made before that can be considered unreliable.

In 1951, Antônio Lemos Barbosa published his Pequeno Vocabulário Tupi-Português (Small Tupi-Portuguese Vocabulary), and in 1970, the Pequeno Vocabulário Português-Tupi (Small Portuguese-Tupi Vocabulary). For Navarro, "they are the only works that were widely based on the Vocabulário na Língua Brasílica from the 16th century and on the texts of the sixteenth and seventeenth-century authors. Therefore, they are the only reliable works in this genre."

Another relevant dictionary, not mentioned by Navarro in the introduction to his work, is Dicionário tupi (antigo)-Português (Tupi (Ancient) - Portuguese Dictionary) (1987) by Moacyr Ribeiro de Carvalho.

== Reactions ==
Anthropologist Benedito Prezia stated at the book launch ceremony that Navarro is fulfilling a historical debt with Tupi. He pointed out that the last dictionary (which was, in fact, a vocabulary) was published in 1950 and that until then, the main reference for Tupi was still the dictionary from the 16th century Jesuits.

=== Criticisms ===
As Navarro himself stated, no work is immune to errors, especially a large one. The dictionary raised some controversies, some of which Navarro corrected. One of them is the spelling of the word pyrang, which means red. Contrary to what was originally stated (before the dictionary was published), the word is spelled with an i: piranga, as in the word 'ypiranga, which means red river.

The same critic also argued that Navarro's work allegedly fails to mention other important scholars of the Tupi language. He also questioned some of the etymologies presented by the author.

Another criticism involves the updating of the spelling used in the primary sources. Navarro not only adopted a new spelling for the entry words, but also updated the spelling of the primary sources' quotations used as examples. Navarro responded that his goal was to spread knowledge of Old Tupi, which is why he chose this orthography.

If I had done it [referring to using the original spelling from the documents], the dictionary would become useless to a larger audience. As I have pointed out elsewhere, disseminating Old Tupi is the goal I aim for. [...] He [the critic] wants, just like it happens with himself, that no one reads it, no one writes it, no one speaks it, that no one, in short, knows it. He wants complete fidelity to the orthography of the originals so that Old Tupi continues to be poorly known or known only at a structural level [...]

— Eduardo Navarro

== See also ==
- Tesoro de la Lengua Guaraní (Treasure of the Guarani Language, an Old Guarani dictionary)
