= Arte de grammatica da lingoa mais usada na costa do Brasil =

1595 book by Joseph of Anchieta

Art of Grammar of the Most Used Language on the Coast of Brazil
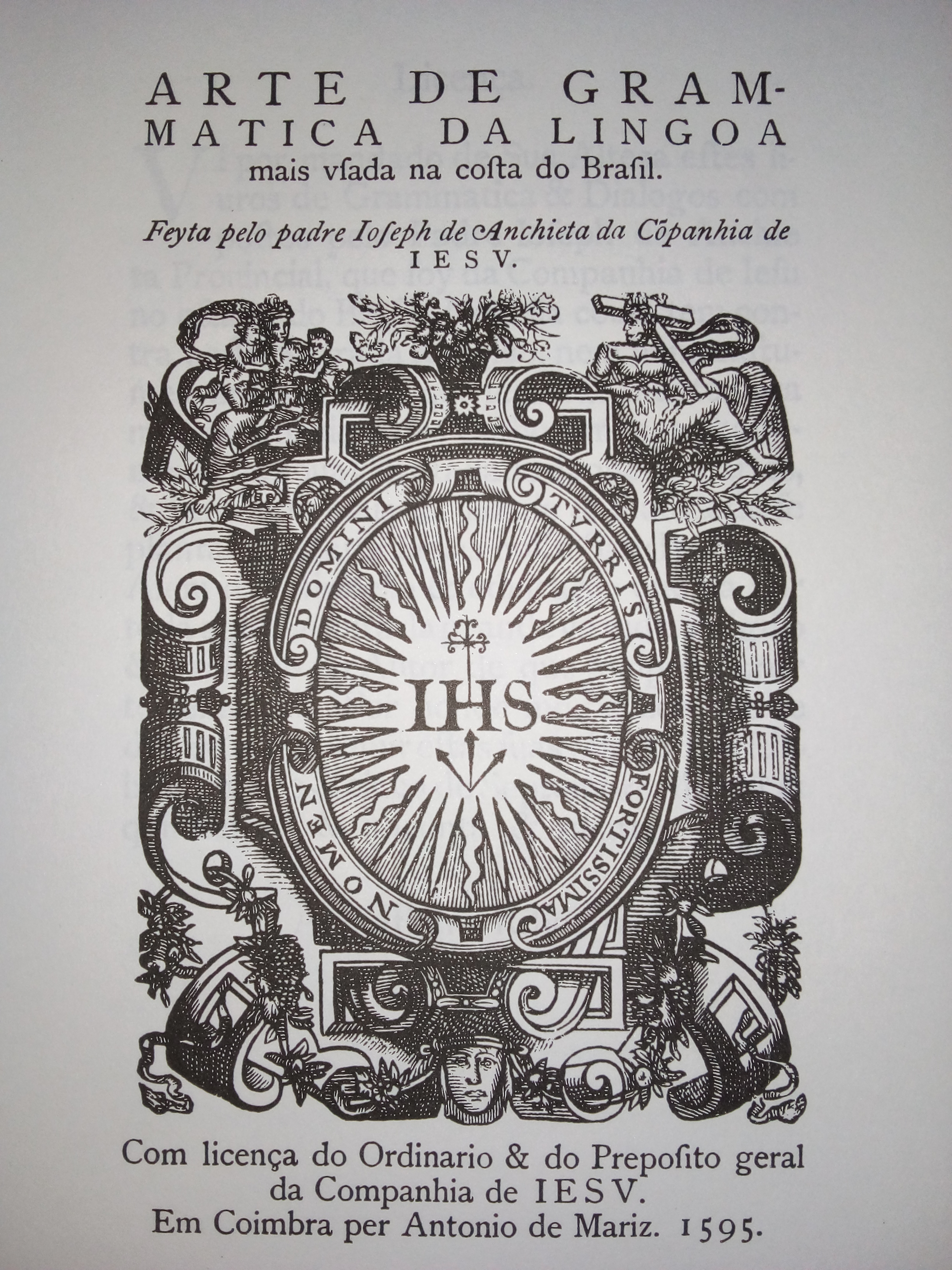
- Frontispiece
- Author: Joseph of Anchieta
- Original title: Arte de gramática da língua mais usada na costa do Brasil
- Language: Portuguese
- Publication date: 1595
- Publication place: Portugal
- Original text: Arte de gramática da língua mais usada na costa do Brasil online

Art of Grammar of the Most Used Language on the Coast of Brazil (Portuguese: Arte de gramática da língua mais usada na costa do Brasil) is a book written in 1555 by Jesuit priest Joseph of Anchieta and first published in Portugal in the year 1595.

It is the first grammar of a Brazilian Indigenous language—in this case, Old Tupi—and the third one of an American Indigenous language, following the grammar of Quechua by Domingo de Santo Tomás, published in 1560, and Alonso de Molina's Arte de la lengua mexicana y castellana, published in 1571. In 1874, the work was translated into German by linguist Julius Platzmann under the title Grammatik der brasilianischen Sprache, mit Zugrundelegung des Anchieta. (Note: Available here) It is the only known translation of this book by Anchieta.

== Antecedents ==
Although the Art of Joseph of Anchieta is considered the first grammar of Old Tupi, information regarding the grammar of the language was first published in 1578 by the French Calvinist Jean de Léry, who visited Rio de Janeiro in the mid-1550s and added grammatical explanations as appendix to his travel narrative during the time of Villegaignon's France Antarctique.

== Author ==
Joseph of Anchieta was born in La Laguna, Tenerife, in 1534. He studied in Coimbra from 1548 to 1551, where he entered the Society of Jesus, and arrived in Brazil, specifically in Salvador, in July 1553. There, Anchieta took linguistic notes from João de Azpilcueta Navarro, the first Jesuit to learn Old Tupi. He traveled in November of the same year to São Vicente, where he arrived in December. In January 1554, Anchieta went inland with Manuel da Nóbrega and together they founded a college in Piratininga, where he served as a Latin teacher for eleven years. Although he may have initiated the learning of the Old Tupi language in Salvador, Bahia, he truly mastered it in Piratininga, inhabited by the Tupi Indians, in whose dialect (Note: The term Tupi acquired a broad sense in the 19th century. Originally, it referred to the 16th-century Tupi–Guarani Indians established on the coast of Santos and São Vicente, as well as along the upper Tietê River. Anchieta referred to them as "Tupis of São Vicente" (also known as Tupiniquins), and their language exhibited some characteristics that distinguished it from that of the "Potiguaras of Paraíba to the Tamoios of Rio de Janeiro".) he probably wrote the first version of his grammar, still in the 1550s. The grammar was only published in 1595 and, therefore, may have been revised several times after he began living with the Tupinambás—in Bahia, Rio de Janeiro, and Espírito Santo. (Note: Anchieta insinuates the existence of dialectal variants; indeed, on the second page of the work, he informs about systematic differences between the dialects of the Tupis and the Tupinambás.)

== History ==
The Art of Joseph of Anchieta was written in Piratininga or São Vicente, between the years 1553 (when he arrived in that region) and 1555 (when Manuel da Nóbrega took it to Bahia). Anchieta probably was unaware, at the time, of the dialectal variants of Old Tupi. The first version of his work must have ignored them; with his travels and changes of residence over 43 years in Brazil, he was able to account for these variants in his grammar, probably reworking it more than once. It is also possible that Anchieta received contributions from third parties, as it was used daily in the Tupi courses taught by the Jesuits to the missionaries.

In 1592, authorization was requested to publish the book, along with a Christian doctrine, but, likely due to financial constraints, only Anchieta's grammar was printed. This occurred in 1595 in the city of Coimbra.

== Content ==
The following are the 16 chapters of the Art of Anchieta:

- Chapter I – Das letras.
- Chapter II – Da Orthographia ou pronunciação.
- Chapter III – De accentu.
- Chapter IIII – Dos Nomes.
- Chapter V – Dos pronomes.
- Chapter VI – Arte da dos Verbos.
- Chapter VII – Annotações, na Conjugação.
- Chapter VIII – Da Construição dos verbos activos.
- Chapter IX – Dalgüas maneiras de verbos em que esta amphibologia se tira.
- Chapter X – Das Proeposições.
- Chapter XI – De sum, es, fui.
- Chapter XII – Dos verbos neutros feitos activos.
- Chapter XIII – Dos activos feitos neutros.
- Chapter XIIII – Da Composição dos verbos.
- Chapter XV – Da Repetição dos verbos.
- Chapter XVI – De algüs verbos irregulares de Aê

== Reception ==
Anchieta's grammar was for several decades the only existing compendium for the teaching of Old Tupi, but its didactic qualities were not recognized at the time. In Luís Figueira's Art of circa 1628, Manuel Cardoso attributes to Anchieta the merit of the first grammar, but to Figueira the clarity in teaching. Cardoso argues that Anchieta's Art is detailed and inaccessible, stating it to be "diminutive and confusing, as we all have experienced", and expressing gratitude for Figueira's alternative. Luís Figueira himself does not mention Anchieta in the prologue of his grammar.

== See also ==
- Art of Grammar of the Brasílica Language of the Kiriri Nation

== Bibliography ==
- Assunção, Carlos; Fonseca, Maria do Céu (2005). "A arte de Grammatica da Lingoa mais usada na costa do Brasil, de José de Anchieta, no quadro da gramaticalização de vernáculos europeus" [The Art of Grammar of the Most Used Language on the Coast of Brazil, by José de Anchieta, within the framework of the grammaticalization of European vernaculars]. Estudos em Homenagem ao Professor Doutor Mário Vilela (in Portuguese). Vol. 1. Porto: Faculdade de Letras da Universidade do Porto. ISBN 972-8932-06-5. ISSN 1646-0820.
- Drumond, Carlos (1990). "Apresentação" [Presentation]. Arte de gramática da língua mais usada na costa do Brasil (in Portuguese) (7th ed.). São Paulo: Edições Loyola. ISBN 85-15-00171-3.
- Egan, Caroline; Lessa de Sá, Vivien Kogut (2020). "Translation and prolepsis: the Jesuit origins of a Tupi Christian doctrine". In Newson, Linda A. (ed.). Cultural Worlds of the Jesuits in Colonial Latin America. London: University of London Press. ISBN 978-1-908857-75-0. JSTOR j.ctvwrm4h1.
- Ferraz Gerardi, Fabrício (2023). A Role and Reference Grammar Description of Tupinambá. Tübingen Library Publishing. doi:10.15496/publikation-83610. hdl:10900/142263. ISBN 978-3-946552-85-7. Archived from the original on 7 January 2024.
- Magalhães, Pablo Antonio Iglesias (2011). "A palavra e o império: a Arte da lingua brasilica e a conquista do Maranhão" [The word and the empire: the Art of the Brasilica Language and the conquest of Maranhão]. Revista de História (in Portuguese) (165): 367–401. doi:10.11606/issn.2316-9141.v0i165p367-401. Archived from the original on 27 February 2023.
- Navarro, Eduardo de Almeida (2022). A Era das Gramáticas: a questão das línguas na época do Renascimento e das Grandes Navegações [The Age of Grammars: the question of languages in the time of the Renaissance and the Great Navigations] (PDF) (in Portuguese). Campinas: Pontes Editores. ISBN 978-65-5637-630-1. Archived (PDF) from the original on 10 January 2024.
- Navarro, Eduardo de Almeida; Tessuto Júnior, Edgard (May 2016). "Breve história da língua tupi" [Brief history of the Tupi language]. Revista Metalinguagens (in Portuguese). 3 (1). ISSN 2358-2790. Archived from the original on 3 January 2024.
- Pereira, Paulo Roberto (2006). "Do bom selvagem ao bárbaro canibal" [From the noble savage to the cannibal barbarian]. Revista Brasileira (in Portuguese) (46). Archived from the original on 19 December 2023.
- Rodrigues, Aryon Dall'Igna (1958). Phonologie der Tupinambá-Sprache [Phonology of the Tupinambá language] (in German). Hamburg: Philosophischen Fakultät der Universität Hamburg. Archived from the original on 28 November 2023.
- Rodrigues, Aryon Dall'Igna (June 1995). "O nome Curitiba" [The name Curitiba] (PDF). Boletim Informativo da Casa Romário Martins (in Portuguese). 21 (105). Archived (PDF) from the original on 5 February 2024.
- Rodrigues, Aryon D. (1997). "Descripción del tupinambá en el período colonial: el Arte de José de Anchieta" [Description of the Tupinambá in the colonial period: the Art of Joseph of Anchieta] (PDF). In Zimmermann, Klaus (ed.). La descripción de las lenguas amerindias en la época colonial (in Spanish). Madrid: Iberoamericana. ISBN 84-88906-74-9. ISSN 0067-8015.
- Schmidt-Riese, Roland (2010). "Anchieta 1595 e Figueira 1621. Representações da gramática do tupinambá" [Anchieta 1595 and Figueira 1621. Representations of the grammar of Tupinambá]. O português e o tupi no Brasil (in Portuguese). São Paulo: Contexto. ISBN 978-85-7244-472-9.
