= Antônio Lemos Barbosa =

Brazilian priest and Tupinologist (1910–1970)

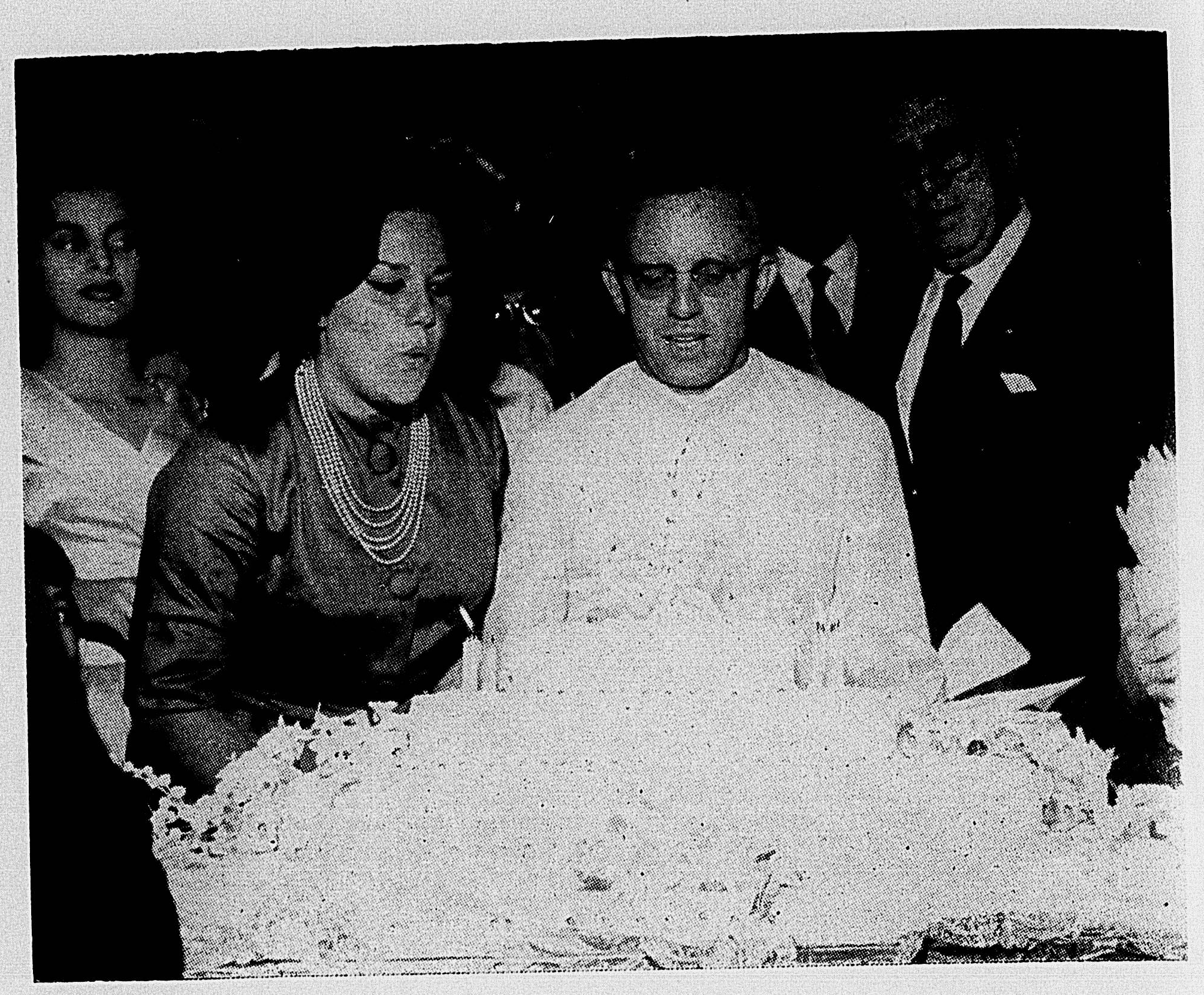
- Barbosa on 25 July 1959, during his priestly silver jubilee
- Born: 15 September 1910; Três Corações, Minas Gerais, Brazil
- Died: 5 September 1970 (aged 59); Rio de Janeiro, Guanabara, Brazil
- Notable work: Curso de tupi antigo: gramática, exercícios, textos

Antônio Lemos Barbosa (15 September 1910 – 5 September 1970) was a Brazilian priest, notably recognized for his contributions to Tupinology, that is, the study of Old Tupi.

Born in Três Corações, Barbosa took a humanities course in Campanha, studied for seven years in Rome, and was ordained in 1934. He held a doctorate in Philosophy and Theology, a bachelor's degree in canon law, and also took a linguistics course. Barbosa was a professor of Ethnography and Indigenous languages at the Pontifical Catholic University of Rio de Janeiro (PUC-Rio). After more than ten years of work, in 1956 he published his Curso de tupi antigo, which came to be considered a "didactic revolution".

Barbosa died in 1970 at the age of 59, after two months in the hospital. His death is considered premature, as it prevented him from continuing his work on Tupi.

== Biography ==
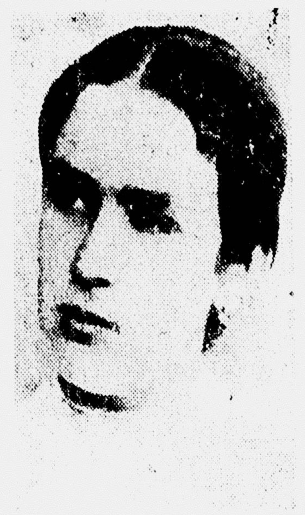
Júlia Lemos Barbosa

Antônio Lemos Barbosa was born on 15 September 1910, in Três Corações, Minas Gerais, being the second of four children. His father, Luís Ferreira Barbosa, was a teacher at the house of his grandfather; there, Luís met Júlia Lemos Barbosa (née Lemos), who died when Barbosa was 11 years old, during the birth of the couple's fifth child, who also died.

Barbosa took a humanities course at then Jesuit-led Diocesan Seminary of Campanha. He pursued studies for seven years, from 1927 to 1934, at the Gregorian University in Rome, where he earned doctoral degrees in Philosophy and Theology and a bachelor's degree in canon law. He was ordained priest by Marchetti Selvaggiani on 25 July 1934. Barbosa celebrated his first Low Mass in the Catacombs of Domitilla, and his first High Mass at the Pontifical Pio Brazilian College. He also took a linguistics course at the Biblical Institute.

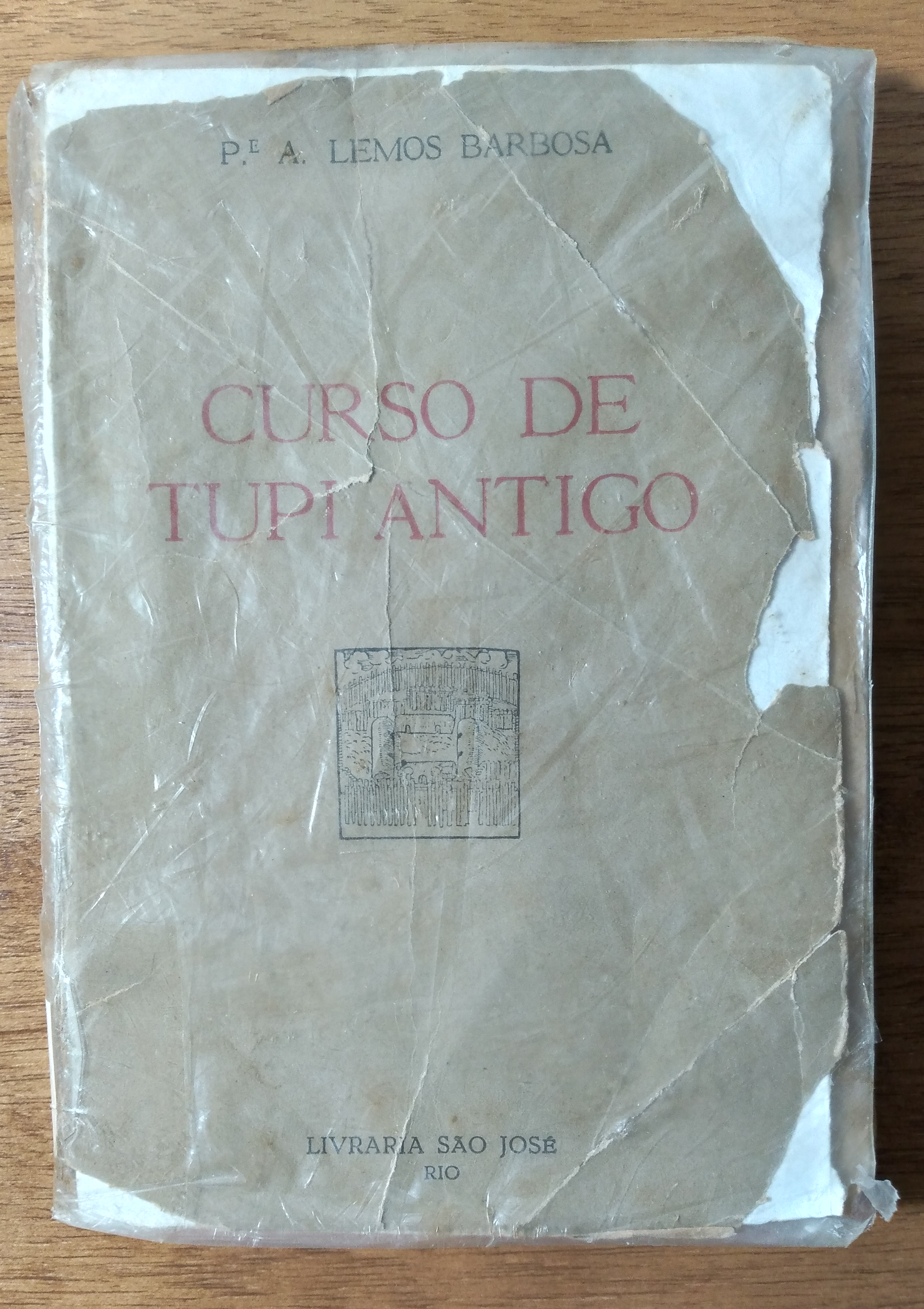
Curso de tupi antigo

Barbosa served as professor of Ethnography and Indigenous Languages (specifically Old Tupi) at the Pontifical Catholic University of Rio de Janeiro (PUC-Rio). In 1956, after more than ten years of work, he published the book Curso de tupi antigo: gramática, exercícios, textos (lit. 'Course of Old Tupi: grammar, exercises, texts'), which received favorable reviews from contemporary critics. Basílio de Magalhães, for instance, declared the work constituted a "didactic revolution". Aryon Rodrigues considered it as being based on a conservative analysis, but "for that very reason" quite accessible to the non-specialist reader. Barbosa's book has also been called "the most complete and perfect grammar of the Tupi language". It is considered that the work contains "interesting insights", but also that one of its weaknesses lies in the made-up, non-attested examples; it is deemed more reasonable that the description of a dead language contains only attested examples. Starting in the 1950s, in 1951 and 1970, Barbosa published two short Old Tupi vocabularies, while acknowledging the need to publish a dictionary of that language. In 1986, Rodrigues considered them the only reliable Old Tupi dictionaries available on the market; in 2013, Eduardo de Almeida Navarro said they were the only serious and reliable works that had existed in the genre.

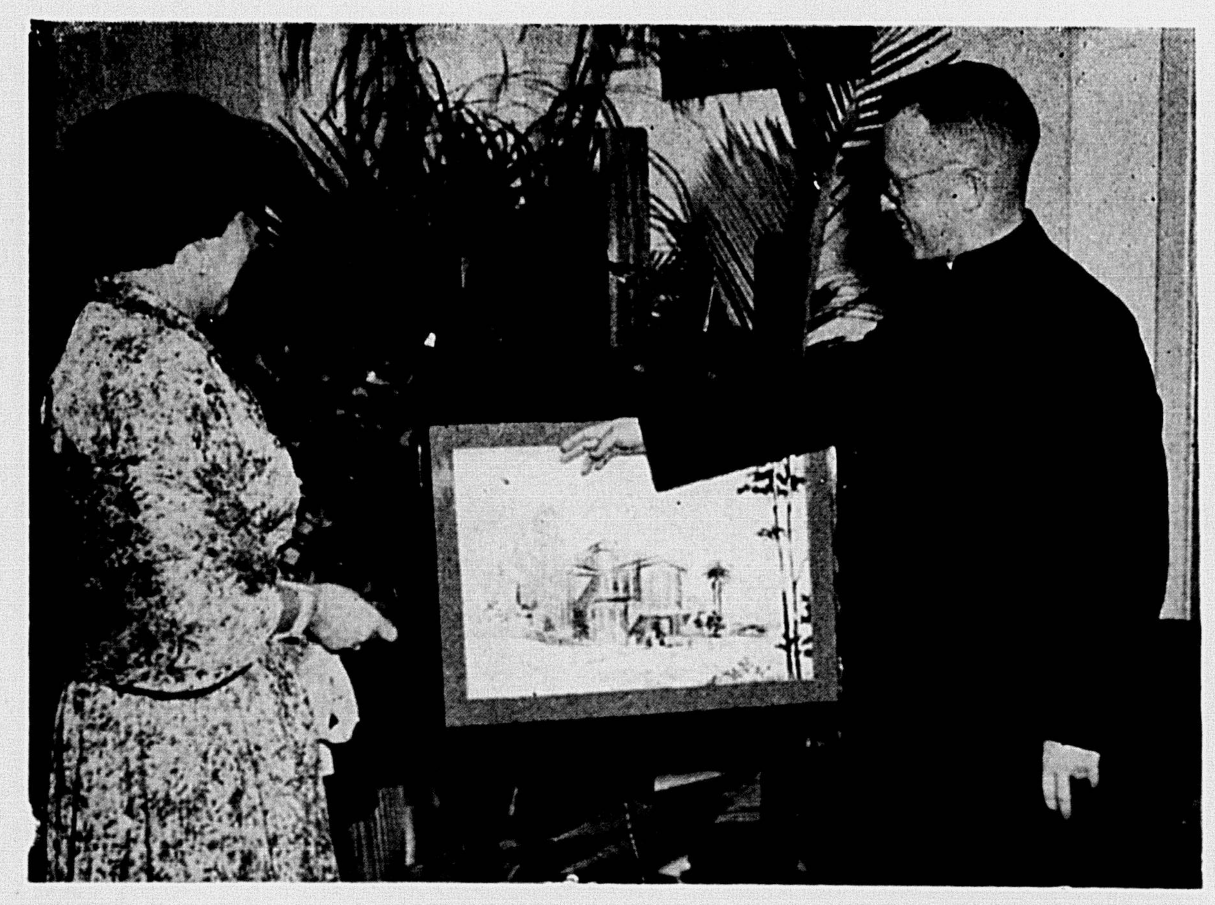
Antônio Lemos Barbosa and Jandira Café

Barbosa assisted in the reconstruction of the Paróquia da Ressurreição, whose first headquarters was located where the Fort Copacabana is today, dedicating himself to it from 1947 until his death in 1970 and lefting two properties for its construction. For it, he also received the support of Brazil's then first lady, Jandira Café, as well as other contemporary figures, such as Eurico Gaspar Dutra, Eduardo Gomes, Amorim do Valle, and Juarez Távora. In 1954, Barbosa became its rector. After his death, Eduardo Koaik was appointed to lead it.

=== Death ===
Barbosa died on 5 September 1970, after being hospitalized for two months at Casa de Saúde São José. His death is regarded as premature for having prevented him from fulfilling his wish to write an Old Tupi dictionary similar to Antonio Ruiz de Montoya's Tesoro de la lengua guaraní.

== Works ==
- Barbosa, Antônio Lemos (1937). "O locativo tupi na toponímia brasileira" [The Tupi locative in the Brazilian toponymy]. Revista do Arquivo Municipal (in Portuguese). 38. São Paulo: 57–60. Archived from the original on 15 August 2025.
- Barbosa, Antônio Lemos (1940). "Teodoro Sampaio e Hans Staden" [Teodoro Sampaio and Hans Staden]. Revista do Arquivo Municipal (in Portuguese). 67. São Paulo: 223–236. Archived from the original on 15 August 2025.
- Barbosa, Antônio Lemos (1941). "Juká: o paradigma da conjugação tupí" [Juká: the paradigm of the Tupi conjugation]. Revista Filológica (in Portuguese). 2 (12). Rio de Janeiro: 74–84. Archived from the original on 15 August 2025.
- Barbosa, Antônio Lemos (1944). Estudos de Tupi: o "Diálogo de Léry" na restauração de Plinio Airosa [Studies of Tupi: the "Dialogue of Léry" in the restoration by Plinio Airosa] (in Portuguese). Archived from the original on 13 August 2025.
- Dom Pedro II (1945). Barbosa, Antônio Lemos (ed.). "Quelques notes sur la langue tupí" [Some notes on the Tupi language]. Anuário do Museu Imperial (in French and Portuguese). 6. Petrópolis: 169–188. Archived from the original on 13 August 2025.
- Barbosa, Antônio Lemos (7 August 1946). "Uma raridade ameaçada" [A threatened rarity]. A Manhã (in Portuguese). pp. 4, 2.
- Barbosa, Antônio Lemos (1947). "Nova categoria gramatical tupi" [New Tupi grammatical category]. Verbum (in Portuguese). 4 (2). Rio de Janeiro: 67–74. Archived from the original on 15 August 2025.
- Barbosa, Antônio Lemos (1948). O "Vocabulario na Lingua Brasilica" [The "Vocabulary in the Brazilian Language"] (in Portuguese). Rio de Janeiro: Ministério da Educação e Saúde. Archived from the original on 14 August 2025.
- Barbosa, Antônio Lemos (1949). "Traduções de poesias tupis" [Translations of Tupi poems]. Revista do Arquivo Municipal (in Portuguese). 26 (128). São Paulo. Archived from the original on 13 August 2025.
- Barbosa, Antônio Lemos (1951). Pequeno vocabulário tupi-português [Small Tupi–Portuguese vocabulary] (in Portuguese). Rio de Janeiro: Livraria São José. Archived from the original on 13 August 2025.
- Barbosa, Antônio Lemos (1952). "Apresentação" [Presentation]. Catecismo na Língua Brasílica: reprodução fac-similar da 1.ª edição (1618) [Catechism in the Brazilian Language: facsimile reproduction of the 1st edition (1618)] (in Portuguese). Rio de Janeiro: Pontifícia Universidade Católica do Rio de Janeiro. pp. IX–XVII. Archived from the original on 6 September 2025.
- Barbosa, Antônio Lemos (1956). Curso de tupi antigo: gramática, exercícios, textos [Course of Old Tupi: grammar, exercises, texts] (in Portuguese). Rio de Janeiro: Livraria São José. Archived from the original on 18 August 2025.
- Barbosa, Antônio Lemos (1970). Pequeno vocabulário português-tupi [Small Portuguese–Tupi vocabulary] (in Portuguese). Rio de Janeiro: Livraria São José. Archived from the original on 14 August 2025.

== Bibliography ==
- Gerardi, Fabrício Ferraz (2023). A Role and Reference Grammar Description of Tupinambá. Tübingen Library Publishing. doi:10.15496/publikation-83610. hdl:10900/142263. ISBN 978-3-946552-85-7. Archived from the original on 7 January 2024.
- Navarro, Eduardo de Almeida (2013). Dicionário de tupi antigo: a língua indígena clássica do Brasil [Dictionary of Old Tupi: the classical Indigenous language of Brazil ] (in Portuguese) (1st ed.). São Paulo: Global. ISBN 978-85-260-1933-1.
- Rodrigues, Aryon Dall'Igna (1986). Línguas brasileiras: para o conhecimento das línguas indígenas [Brazilian languages: for the knowledge of the Indigenous languages] (in Portuguese). São Paulo: Edições Loyola. Archived from the original on 18 December 2025.
- Vellinho, Moysés, ed. (1947). Provincia de São Pedro [Province of São Pedro] (in Portuguese). Vol. 8. Livraria do Globo.
- Viégas, Ahmés Pinto (1971). Vocabulário português-tupi, tupi-português [Portuguese–Tupi, Tupi–Portuguese vocabulary] (in Portuguese). Campinas: Instituto Agronômico. Archived from the original on 14 August 2025.
