= Eduardo de Almeida Navarro =

Brazilian philologist and lexicographer

Eduardo Navarro
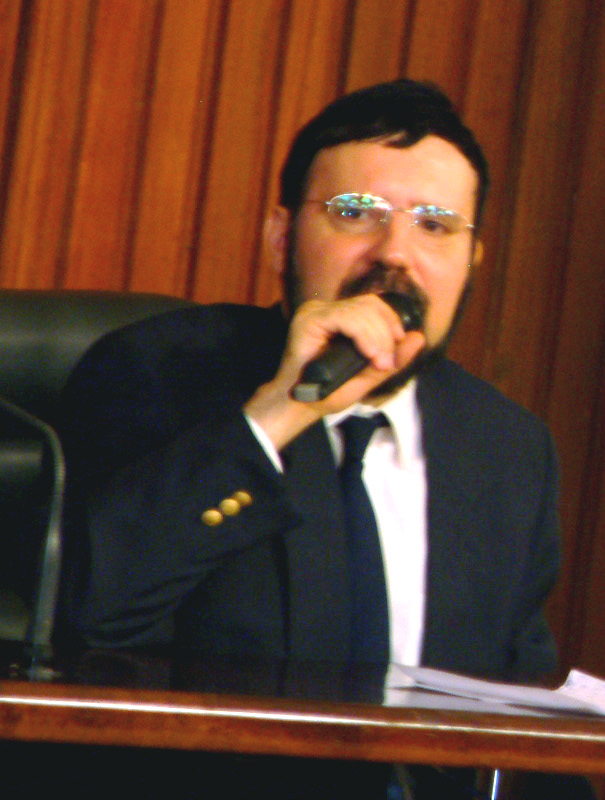
- Born: Eduardo de Almeida Navarro; 20 February 1962 (age 64); Fernandópolis, São Paulo, Brazil
- Education: University of São Paulo; São Paulo State University
- Occupations: teacher researcher translator
- Known for: contributions to tupi studies
- Notable work: Dicionário de tupi antigo: a língua indígena clássica do Brasil; Método moderno de tupi antigo: a língua do Brasil dos primeiros séculos

Eduardo de Almeida Navarro (born 20 February 1962) is a Brazilian philologist and lexicographer, specialist in Old Tupi and Nheengatu. He is a full professor at the University of São Paulo, where he has been teaching Old Tupi since 1993, and Nheengatu since 2009. Eduardo Navarro is also the author of the books Método moderno de tupi antigo (Modern Method of Old Tupi), 1998, and Dicionário de tupi antigo (Dictionary of Old Tupi), 2013, important works on the Tupi language.

== Biography ==
Eduardo de Almeida Navarro was born on 20 February 1962 in the city of Fernandópolis, being the second son of Gabriel Navarro and Dalva de Almeida. He graduated in Geography from the São Paulo State University and in Classics from the University of São Paulo. In 1995, he received his PhD with a thesis on the issue of languages in the Renaissance. In 1997, he published Anchieta: vida e pensamentos (Anchieta, Life and Thinking), a book about the Spanish Jesuit priest José de Anchieta, author of the first grammar of Old Tupi and one of the first authors of Brazilian literature.

In 1998, Navarro launched the book Método moderno de tupi antigo: a língua do Brasil dos primeiros séculos (Modern Method of Old Tupi: The Language of Brazil in the First Centuries), which aims to enable students to read 16th and 17th century texts in this language, showing the penetration of Old Tupi in Brazilian culture. In April 2000, on the occasion of the celebration of the 500 years since the discovery of Brazil, Navarro gave a lecture to 800 people at Unigranrio. In 2005 he did a post-doctorate in India, where he went to study the origins of the myth of São Tomé in Brazil.

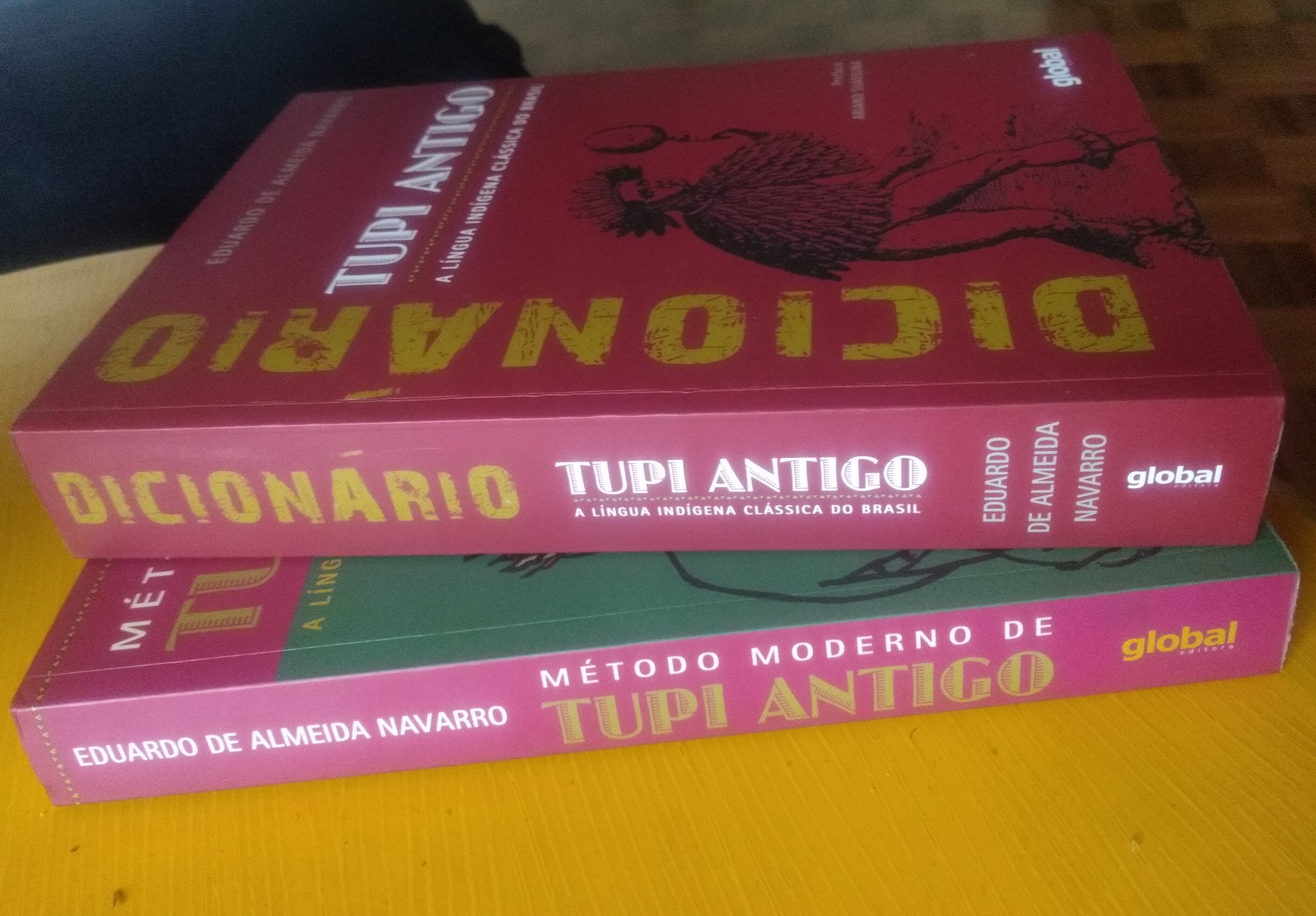
Navarro's magna opera

In 2013, Navarro released Dicionário de tupi antigo: a língua indígena clássica do Brasil (Dictionary of Old Tupi: the Classic Indigenous Language of Brazil), in which he describes almost eight thousand words of this language, thus surpassing Tesoro de la lengua guaraní, by Antonio Ruiz de Montoya, which displays about five thousand entries. He is currently preparing a Nheengatu dictionary.

== Contributions ==
=== Tupi literature ===
Eduardo Navarro was the organizer and main translator of the books Poemas: lírica portuguesa e tupi (Poems: Portuguese and Tupi poetry), of 1997, and Teatro, of 1999, in which he wrote explanatory notes and modernized the original spelling of the texts, most of which had been written in Old Tupi by José de Anchieta.

He was also responsible for writing the preface and footnotes of the reedition of Ferdinand Denis' book Uma festa brasileira, and translated part of it directly from Old Tupi. The first edition of this book had been published in 1850 in Paris. The new edition was launched in October 2007, with a bilingual version in French and Portuguese. The excerpt translated by Navarro was Poemas brasílicos (Brazilian Poetry), by Father Cristóvão Valente.

=== Camarão Indians' letters ===
In 2021, Eduardo Navarro announced that he had translated the six letters of the Camarão Indians, discovered more than 130 years ago in the Netherlands, where they have been kept for almost 400 years. The letters, all in Tupi, are the only record of literate Indians writing in the colonial period. The transcription and annotated full translation of the Camarão Indians' letters were published in the periodical Boletim do Museu Paraense Emílio Goeldi in October 2022.

=== Tupi language revival ===
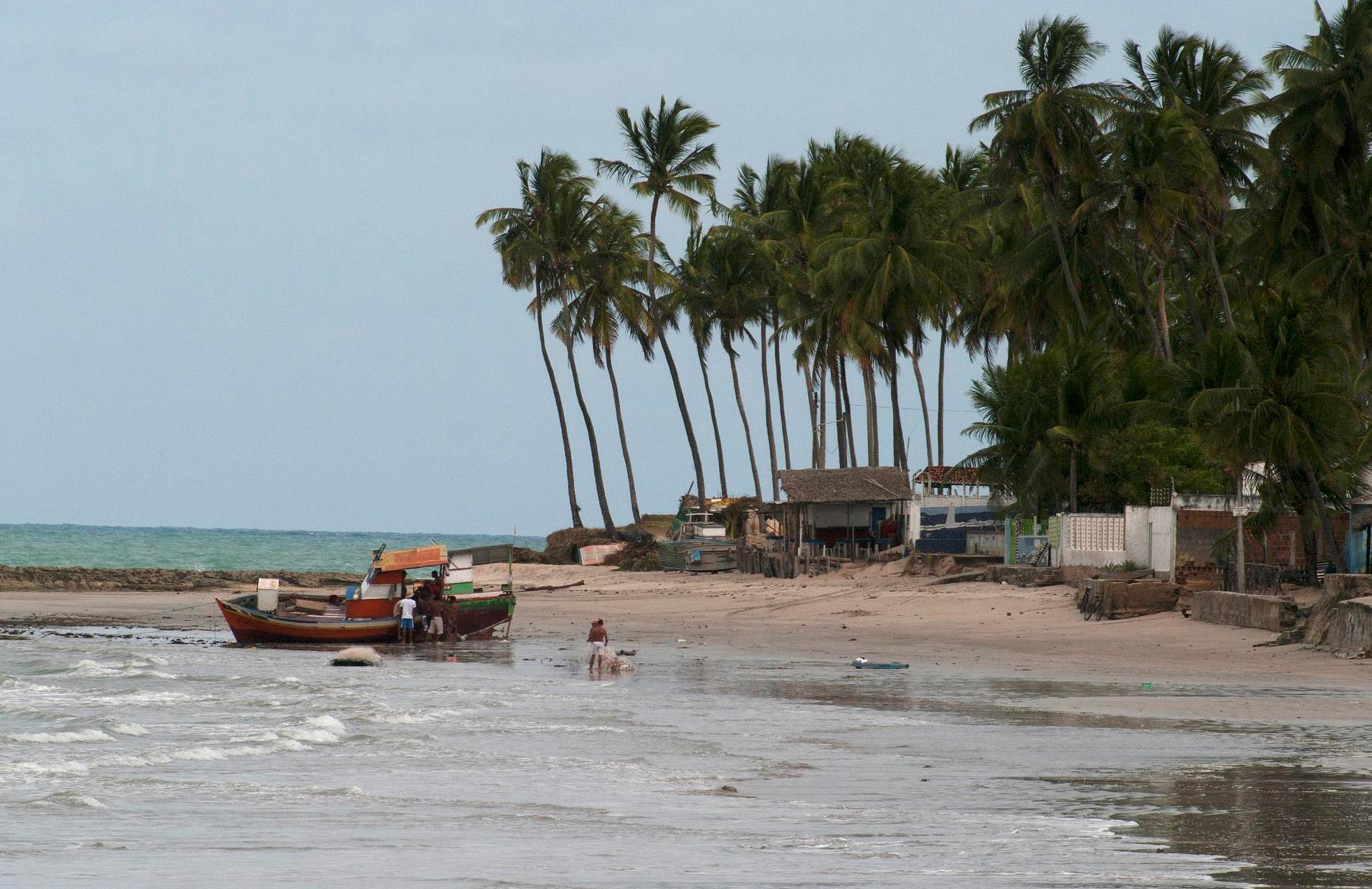
The Baía da Traição beach, in whose homonymous municipality an attempt is being made to rescue the indigenous language

Since the year 2000, Eduardo Navarro has been training teachers of Old Tupi for indigenous schools in Paraíba, in an initiative called Projeto Poti. The first course in Old Tupi, held in Baía da Traição, lasted two years and trained 17 monitors to act as teachers in Potiguaras schools, aiming to multiply the knowledge about this language in order to recover it.

There was also the institutionalization of the Tupi language in the curriculum of the indigenous schools. In fact, the subject is taught from the early years to high school.

=== Hans Staden (film) ===
Eduardo Navarro was responsible for the translation into Tupi of the entire script of the film about the German adventurer Hans Staden, who visited Brazil twice in the 16th century. The feature film, directed by Luiz Alberto Pereira, was released in 1999 on the occasion of the celebrations for Brazil's 500th anniversary.

== Awards ==
- 2000 — Medalha Brasil 500 Anos, awarded by the Brazilian Genealogical Institute and by the São Paulo Academy of Letters.
- 2013 — Los Destacados de ALIJA, awardes by Asociación de Literatura Infantil y Juvenil Argentina, for the translation of Cabeza hueca, cabeza seca.

== Selected works ==
- ANCHIETA, José de (2004). Poemas: lírica portuguesa e tupi (in Portuguese). Translated by NAVARRO, Eduardo de Almeida (2.ª ed.). São Paulo: Martins Fontes. p. 240. ISBN 9788533619562.
- ANCHIETA, José de (2006). Teatro (in Portuguese). Translated by NAVARRO, Eduardo de Almeida (2.ª ed.). São Paulo: Martins Fontes. p. 224. ISBN 9788533621428.
- NAVARRO, Eduardo de Almeida (2005). Método moderno de tupi antigo: a língua do Brasil dos primeiros séculos (in Portuguese) (3.ª ed.). São Paulo: Global. p. 464. ISBN 9788526010581.
- NAVARRO, Eduardo de Almeida (2013). Dicionário de tupi antigo: a língua indígena clássica do Brasil (in Portuguese) (1.ª ed.). São Paulo: Global. p. 624. ISBN 9788526019331.
- NAVARRO, Eduardo de Almeida (2016). Curso de língua geral (nheengatu ou tupi moderno): a língua das origens da civilização amazônica (2.ª ed.). São Paulo: Centro Angel Rama. p. 112. ISBN 9788591262021.
- Histórias em língua geral da Amazônia (in Portuguese) (1.ª ed.). São Paulo: Centro Angel Rama. 2017. p. 112. ISBN 9788591262038.
