= Tupi language =

Tupian language of Brazil

Tupi
- Old Tupi, Ancient Tupi, Classical Tupi, Tupinambá
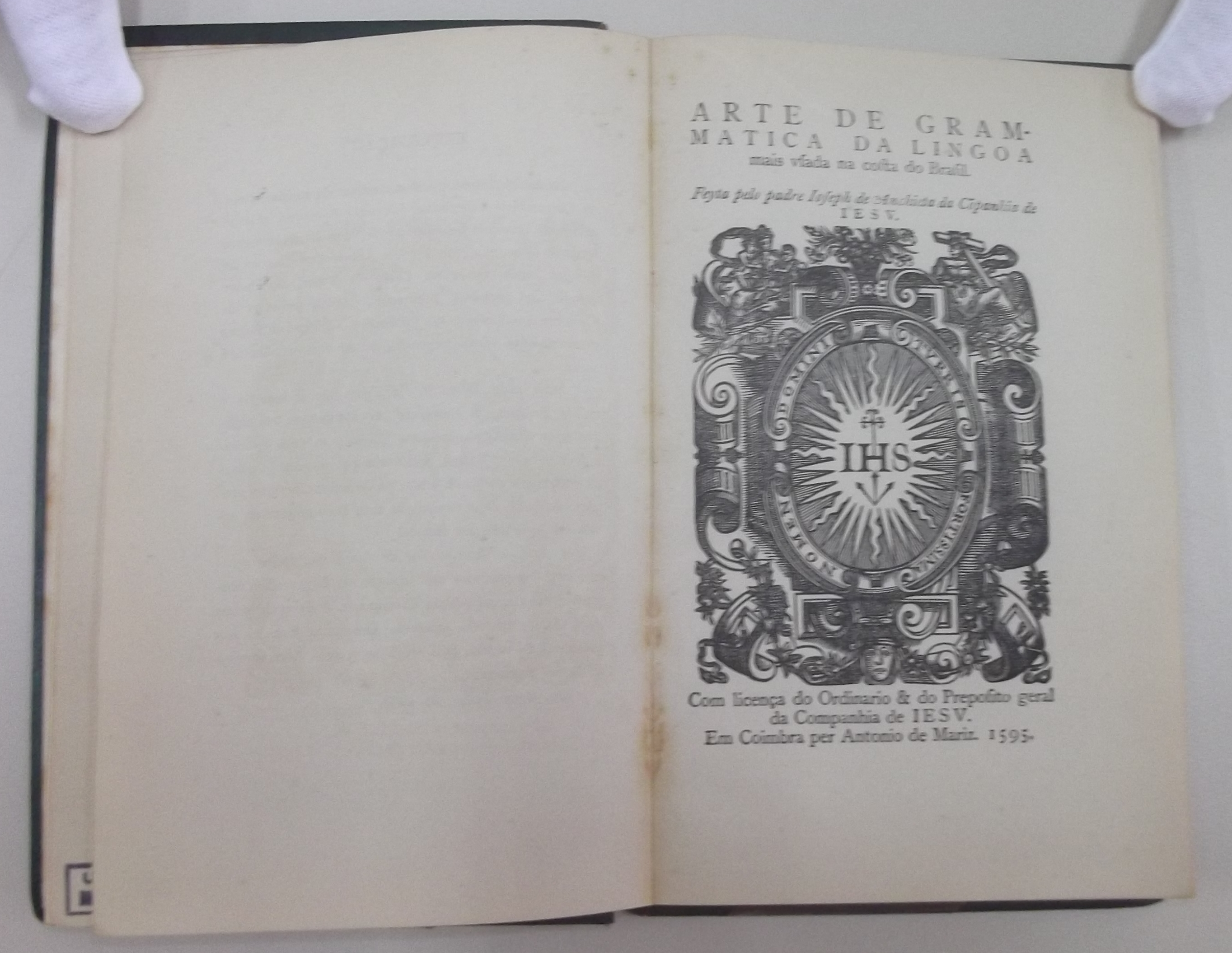
- Facsimile of the Art of Grammar of the Most Used Language on the Coast of Brazil
- Region: Coastline of Brazil
- Ethnicity: Tupinambá, Tupiniquim
- Era: 16th-18th centuries; developed into Nheengatu
- Language family: Tupian: Tupi–Guarani; Tupi
- Writing system: Latin

Language codes
- ISO 639-3: tpn – inclusive code Tupinambá; Individual codes: tpk – Tupiniquim pog – Potiguara tpw – Tupi (retired)
- Glottolog: tupi1273
- Linguasphere: 88-AAI-g

Old Tupi, Ancient Tupi or Classical Tupi (Portuguese pronunciation: [tuˈpi]) is a classical Tupian language which was spoken by the Indigenous Tupi people of Brazil, who inhabited coastal regions in South and Southeast Brazil. In the words of Brazilian tupinologist Eduardo Navarro, "it is the classical indigenous language of Brazil, and the one which had the utmost importance to the cultural and spiritual formation of the country".

Old Tupi belongs to the Tupi–Guarani language family, and has a written history spanning the 16th, 17th, and early 18th centuries. In the early colonial period, Tupi was used as a lingua franca throughout Brazil by Europeans and Amerindians, and had literary usage, but it was later suppressed almost to extinction. Today, its sole living descendant is the Nheengatu language.

As the most important native language of Brazil, it is the origin of most city names of indigenous origin (Pindamonhangaba, Ubatuba, Botucatu, Jacareí). It also names several plants and animals, and many proper names are Tupi names, such as Moacir, Iara, Iracema and Jandaia. It has a rich literature, which includes catechisms, poems and plays.

The names Old Tupi or Classical Tupi are used for the language in English and by modern scholars (it is referred to as tupi antigo in Portuguese). It has previously been known, in Portuguese, as língua brasílica "Brazilian language".

== History ==
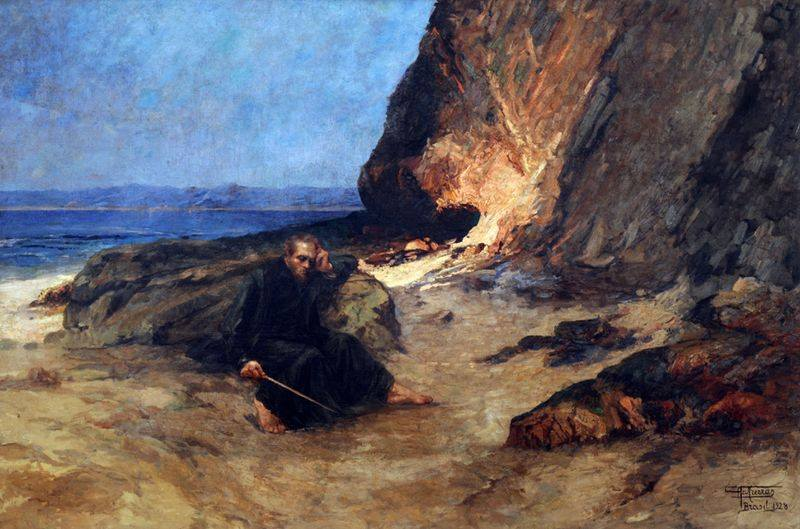
Joseph of Anchieta (1534–1597), the first grammarian of Tupi, as envisioned by Antônio Parreiras

Old Tupi was first spoken by the Tupinambá people, who lived under cultural and social conditions very unlike those found in Europe. It is quite different from Indo-European languages in phonology, morphology, and grammar, but it was adopted by many Luso-Brazilians born in Brazil as a lingua franca.

It belonged to the Tupi–Guarani language family, which stood out among other South American languages for the vast territory it covered. Until the 16th century, these languages were found throughout nearly the entirety of the Brazilian coast, from Pará to Santa Catarina, and the Río de la Plata basin. Today, Tupi languages are still heard in Brazil (states of Maranhão, Pará, Amapá, Amazonas, Mato Grosso, Mato Grosso do Sul, Goiás, São Paulo, Paraná, Santa Catarina, Rio Grande do Sul, Rio de Janeiro, and Espírito Santo), as well as in French Guiana, Venezuela, Colombia, Peru, Bolivia, Paraguay, and Argentina.

It is a common mistake to speak of the "Tupi–Guarani language": Tupi, Guarani and a number of other minor or major languages all belong to the Tupian language family, in the same sense that English, Romanian, and Sanskrit belong to the Indo-European language family. One of the main differences between the two languages was the replacement of Tupi /s/ by the glottal fricative /h/ in Guarani.

The first accounts of the Old Tupi language date back from the early 16th century, but the first written documents containing actual information about it were produced from 1575 onwards – when Jesuits André Thévet and José de Anchieta began to translate Catholic prayers and biblical stories into the language. Another foreigner, Jean de Lery, wrote the first (and possibly only) Tupi "phrasebook", in which he transcribed entire dialogues. Lery's work is the best available record of how Tupi was actually spoken.

In the first two or three centuries of Brazilian history, nearly all colonists coming to Brazil would learn the tupinambá variant of Tupi, as a means of communication with both the Indigenous people and with other early colonists who had adopted the language.

The Jesuits, however, not only learned to speak tupinambá, but also encouraged the natives to keep it. As a part of their missionary work, they translated some literature into it and also produced some original work written directly in Tupi. José de Anchieta reportedly wrote more than 4,000 lines of poetry in tupinambá (which he called lingua Brasilica) and the first Tupi grammar. Luís Figueira was another important figure of this time, who wrote the second Tupi grammar, published circa 1628. In the second half of the 18th century, the works of Anchieta and Figueira were republished and Father João Filipe Bettendorff wrote a new and more complete catechism. By that time, the language had made its way into the clergy and was the de facto national language of Brazil – though it was probably seldom written, as the Roman Catholic Church held a near monopoly of literacy.

When the Portuguese Prime Minister Marquis of Pombal expelled the Jesuits from Brazil in 1759, the language started to wane quickly, as few Brazilians were literate in it. A new rush of Portuguese immigration had been taking place since the early 18th century, due to the discovery of gold, diamonds, and gems in the interior of Brazil, and these new colonists spoke only their mother tongue. Old Tupi survived as a spoken language (used by Europeans and Indian populations alike) only in isolated inland areas, far from the major urban centres. Its use by a few non-Indian speakers in those isolated areas would last for over a century still.

== Documentation ==
When the Portuguese first arrived on the shores of modern-day Brazil, most of the tribes they encountered spoke very closely related languages. The Portuguese (and particularly the Jesuit priests who accompanied them) set out to proselytise the natives. To do so most effectively, doing so in the natives' own languages was convenient, so the first Europeans to study Tupi were those priests.

The priests modeled their analysis of the new language after the one with which they had already experienced: Latin, which they had studied in the seminary. In fact, the first grammar of Tupi—written by the Jesuit priest José de Anchieta and published in 1595—is structured much like a contemporary Latin grammar. While this structure is not optimal, it certainly served its purpose of allowing its intended readership (Catholic priests familiar with Latin grammars) to get enough of a basic grasp of the language to be able to communicate with and evangelise the natives. Also, the grammar sometimes regularised or glossed over some regional differences in the expectation that the student, once "in the field", would learn these finer points of the particular dialect through use with his flock.

Significant works were a Jesuit catechism of 1618, with a second edition of 1686; another grammar written in 1687 by another Jesuit priest, Luís Figueira; an anonymous dictionary of 1795 (again published by the Jesuits); a dictionary published by Antônio Gonçalves Dias, a well-known 19th century Brazilian poet and scholar, in 1858; and a chrestomathy published by Dr Ernesto Ferreira França in 1859. The most recent dictionary is the Old Tupi Dictionary (2013), by the Brazilian scholar Eduardo de Almeida Navarro.

=== Tupinology ===
In Brazil, tupinology is the study of Tupi language and literature. It began in 1901, with the work of Theodoro Sampaio. An individual who dedicates themselves to the field of tupinology is a tupinologist.

== Phonology ==
=== Vowels ===
Tupi vocalic phonemes
	Front		Central		Back	
	oral	nasal	oral	nasal	oral	nasal
Close	i	ĩ	ɨ	ɨ̃	u	ũ
Mid	e	ẽ			o	õ
Open			a	ã		

==== Oral ====
- /a/ is realized as [a] and [ə]. It occurs in all positions.
  - The phone [ə] occurs in unstressed word-final position and is in complementary distribution with [a], as in [jaˈwarə] ("jaguar") and [ˈtaβə] ("village").
  - It is represented in Navarro's orthography by ⟨a⟩, as in ⟨taba⟩ ("village").
- /e, i, o/ are realized as [ɛ, i, ɔ]. They occur "probably" in all positions. Examples are [ɛˈⁿdɛ] ("you"), [iˈtaɲaˈɛ̃] ("stone bowl"), and [ɔˈpak] ("he wakes up").
  - According to Navarro, the "timbre" of ⟨e⟩ and ⟨o⟩ is "probably open", as in Portuguese pé and avó. According to Barbosa, they occupy an intermediate position between their closed and open variants. He describes their sounds as those of mesa and moça, "somewhat less closed", rather than those of vela and mola.
  - They are represented in Navarro's orthography by ⟨e, i, o⟩.
- /ɨ/ is realized as [ɨ]. It occurs "probably" in all positions except unstressed word-final position. An example is [ɨˈtu] ("waterfall").
  - According to Navarro, [ɣ] may appear in syllable-medial position when one syllable ends in ⟨y⟩ and is followed by another beginning with a vowel, as in ⟨yara⟩ ~ ⟨ygara⟩ (realized as [ɨˈɣara], meaning "canoe"). According to Barbosa, it seems to be a vestige of the representation of ⟨y⟩ when ⟨ig⟩ or ⟨yg⟩ were written, as in "Iperoig".
  - It is represented in Navarro's orthography by ⟨y⟩, following the tradition initiated by Figueira in the 17th century, after the "indecision" of the 16th century.
- /u/ is realized as [u]. It occurs in all positions except unstressed word-final position. An example is [taˈtu] ("armadillo").
  - It is represented in Navarro's orthography by ⟨u⟩.

==== Nasal ====
- /ã, ẽ, ĩ, õ, ũ, ɨ̃/ are realized as [ã, ɛ̃, ĩ, ɔ̃, ũ, ɨ̃]. They occur in stressed syllables. Examples are [piˈã] ("a disease"), [ɛˈɛ̃] ("sweet", "salty"), [ˈtĩ] ("nose"), [ˈɾɔ̃] ("thus", "then"), [ˈɲũ] ("field"), and [ɨˈβɨ̃j] ("hollow inner part").
  - They are represented in Navarro's orthography by ⟨ã, ẽ, ĩ, õ, ũ, ỹ⟩. Navarro considers them allophones of the oral vowels, but Gerardi provides minimal pairs.

=== Consonants ===
Tupi consonant phonemes
	Bilabial			Alveolar	Palatal	Velar		Glottal
	plain	labial	pal.	Alveolar	Palatal	plain	labial	Glottal
Nasal	m			n		ŋ		
Plosive	p	(pʷ)	(pʲ)	t		k	(kʷ)	ʔ
Fricative	β ~ b			s	(ʃ)			(h)
Approximant					j	(ɰ)	w	
Tap				ɾ				

==== Nasals ====
- /m/ is realized as [m] and [ᵐb]. It occurs in initial, medial, and final positions.
  - The phone [ᵐb] occurs in syllable-initial position and oral environments, as in /maʔe/ (realized as [ᵐba.ˈʔe], meaning "thing") and /kamɨ/ (realized as [kã.ˈᵐbɨ], meaning "milk").
  - The phone [m] occurs in all other contexts, as in /manõ/ (realized as [mã.ˈnõ], meaning "die").
  - It is represented in Navarro's orthography by ⟨m⟩ and ⟨mb⟩, as in ⟨ma'e⟩ ~ ⟨mba'e⟩ ("thing").
- /n/ is realized as [n] and [ⁿd]. It occurs in initial, medial, and final positions.
  - The phone [ⁿd] occurs in syllable-initial position and oral environments, as in /ne/ (realized as [ˈⁿde], meaning "your") and /anɨra/ (realized as [a.ⁿdɨ.ˈra], meaning "bat").
  - The phone [n] occurs in all other contexts, as in /marakanã/ (realized as [ma.ra.kã.ˈnã], meaning "bird sp.").
  - It is represented in Navarro's orthography by ⟨n⟩ and ⟨nd⟩, as in ⟨ne⟩ ~ ⟨nde⟩ ("you").
- /ŋ/ is realized as [ŋ] and [ᵑɡ]. It occurs in syllable-initial and syllable-final positions.
  - The phone [ŋ] occurs in syllable-final position, as in /pɨraŋ/ (realized as [pɨ.ˈrãŋ], meaning "red").
  - The phone [ᵑɡ] occurs in syllable-initial position, as in /posaŋa/ (realized as [po.ˈsã.ᵑɡə], meaning "medicine").
  - It is represented in Navarro's orthography by ⟨ng⟩, as in ⟨nhe'eng⟩ (realized as [ñɛˈʔɛŋ], meaning "to speak").

==== Plosives ====
- /p/ is realized as [p] and [ᵐb], and /t/ is realized as [t] and [ⁿd]. They occur in initial and medial positions.
- /k/ is realized as [k] and [ŋ]. It occurs in all positions.
  - Rodrigues does not consider /p, t, k/ to be realized as [ᵐb, ⁿd, ŋ]. Examples of /p, t, k/ realized as [ᵐb, ⁿd, ŋ] would be /jũ/ + /pɨterɨpe/ (realized as [ɲũ.ᵐbɨ.te.rɨ.ˈpe], meaning "in the middle of the field"), /emi/ + /tɨpɨrõ/ (realized as [ẽ.mĩ.ⁿdɨ.pɨ.ˈrõ], meaning "stew"), and /kujã/ + /katu/ (realized as [ku.ɲã.ŋa.ˈtu], meaning "good woman").
  - [p, t, k] are represented in Navarro's orthography by ⟨p, t, k⟩, as in ⟨potĩ⟩ ("shrimp"), ⟨taba⟩ ("village"), and ⟨paka⟩ ("paca").
- /pʷ, pʲ, kʷ/ are realized as [pʷ, pʲ, kʷ]. They occur in syllable-initial position. Rodrigues does not list them as phonemes.
- /ʔ/ is realized as [ʔ]. It occurs in root-initial and root-medial positions. Rodrigues makes no mention of the glottal stop, "probably" because he relied on selected sources "without taking into account" genetically related languages.
  - It is represented in Navarro's orthography by ⟨'⟩, an innovation compared to Barbosa and Edelweiss, as in ⟨ka'a⟩ (realized as [kaˈʔa], meaning "forest").

==== Fricatives ====
- /β/ ~ /b/ is realized as [β], [b], and [p̚] (or simply [p]). It occurs in word-initial, root-medial, and final positions.
  - The phones [b] and [p̚] (or simply [p]) occur in final position in free variation, as in /seruβ/ (realized as [ʃe.ˈrub] ~ [ʃe.ˈrup̚] or simply [ʃɛˈɾup], meaning "oh my father").
  - It is represented in Navarro's orthography by ⟨b⟩, and sometimes at the end of a word by ⟨p⟩, as in ⟨tobá⟩ (realized as [tɔˈβa], meaning "face") and ⟨xe r-up!⟩ ("my father!").
  - Cruz considers [β] to be a phone of /m/ and therefore not to have phonemic status.
- /s/ is realized as [s] and [ʃ]. It occurs in initial and medial positions, as in [sɨˈrɨk] ("slide, leak out") and [jaˈsuk] ("wash").
  - The phone [ʃ] occurs when preceded by ⟨i⟩ or ⟨î⟩, as in /isɨ/ (realized as [i.ˈʃɨ], meaning "his mother"). (Note: Gerardi states it also occurs after [ɨ], but Navarro lists several words with ⟨ys⟩, only initially.) It occurs in word-initial position in onomatopoeias, loanwords, the reduced form of /ise/ ("I"), and in suffixes that only occur followed by /i/.
  - It is represented in Navarro's orthography by ⟨s⟩ and ⟨x⟩, as in ⟨a-só⟩ ("I go"), ⟨i xy⟩ ("his mother"), and ⟨ixé⟩ ("I").
- There is a near-minimal pair of [s] and [ʃ] in /posɨj/ ("heavy") and /po.ʃɨ/ ("ugly").
  - According to Rodrigues, /ʃ/ is a phoneme and is realized as [ʃ] and [tʃ]. The phone [ʃ] occurs in word–initial and medial positions, as in [iˈʃɛ] ("I"). The phone [tʃ] occurs in word-initial position, where it is in free variation with [ʃ], as in [tʃjaˈsɔ] ~ [ʃjaˈsɔ] (modernly represented as ⟨t'îasó⟩, meaning "let's go!"). This phone was recorded only by Anchieta, who represented it as ⟨ch⟩ on folio 23 of his grammar.
- [h] is attested in only a few words. According to Barbosa, it appears in only "three or four" words. Gerardi lists five—specifically, all entries in Navarro's dictionary that begin with ⟨h⟩ (hai, hé, hegûé, hegûy, and hẽhẽ). Navarro's work also includes other entries containing ⟨h⟩ in non-initial position, namely ahẽ, ene'ĩhengûy, eriaãhegûy, mahmõ, marãhẽ, tekehẽ, and tekenhanduruãhẽ (an alternative form of tekenhanduruã).

==== Approximants ====
- /w/ is realized as [w]. It occurs in word-initial, medial, and final positions, as in /waj/ ("tail"), /kawĩ/ ("manioc beer"), and /jukaw/ ("kill (non-focal)").
  - According to Navarro, it may also be realized as [gʷ] in syllable-initial position. According to Barbosa, the ⟨g⟩ was introduced there due to the "misperception of Portuguese and Spanish speakers". Navarro further explains this occurred because of the "proximity of the place of articulation". Edelweiss says those who attribute ⟨g⟩ to Portuguese or Spanish influence are "hasty scholars". According to him, ⟨g⟩ is "much softer" in the combination ⟨gû⟩ than in "certain Neo-Latin languages" and "almost inaudible" to "ears unaccustomed to it", and is therefore "often overlooked", although he acknowledges that, in Nheengatu for example, ⟨gû⟩ has been reduced to ⟨û⟩. Edelweiss supports this argument with the spelling ⟨ahoay-guaçu⟩ in the work of Piso, in which ⟨h⟩ would represent a "very soft" ⟨g⟩, as well as with the fourth page of the admonition in the Catecismo na língua brasílica. According to him, ⟨g⟩ had merely a euphonic function, as stated in folio 4v of the grammar of Anchieta and in the admonition of Araújo's Catecismo. French authors almost never write ⟨g⟩ before ⟨û⟩ at the beginning of a word or syllable, which may be explained by their fleeting contacts; it appears only sporadically, as in ⟨ygouare⟩ ("inhabitant of") and ⟨eugouaue⟩ ("drinking place").
  - It is represented in Navarro's orthography by ⟨û⟩ and ⟨gû⟩, as in ⟨ûyrá⟩ ~ ⟨gûyrá⟩ ("bird").
- /j/ is realized as [j], [ɲ], and [ʒ] (or [dʒ], or [ʝ]). It occurs in initial, medial, and final positions.
  - The phone [j] occurs in oral environments and is in free variation with [ʒ] (or [dʒ], or [ʝ]) in syllable-initial position, as in /akaju/ (realized as [a.ka.ˈju] ~ [a.ka.ˈdʒu], meaning "year").
  - The phone [ɲ] occurs when preceded or followed by a nasal syllable, as in /jetiŋ/ (realized as [ɲẽ.ˈtĩŋ], meaning "fly species") and /atõja/ (realized as [a.ˈtõ.ɲã], meaning "touch").
  - It is represented in Navarro's orthography by ⟨î⟩ and ⟨nh⟩, as in ⟨îuká⟩ ("to kill"), ⟨a-î-ybõ⟩ ~ ⟨a-nh-ybõ⟩ ("I shoot an arrow at it") and ⟨kunhã⟩ ("woman").
- Navarro also lists ⟨ŷ⟩ ([ɰ]), as in ⟨apŷaba⟩ ("man"), ⟨abŷabo⟩ ("transgressing"), and ⟨kapŷaba⟩ ("country house").

==== Tap ====
- /ɾ/ is realized as [ɾ] and [t̚] (or simply [t]). It occurs in initial, medial, and word-final positions, as in [ɾa.ˈko] ("actually"), [pi.ˈɾa] ("fish"), and [e.ˈkaɾ] ("seek").
  - The phone [ɾ] is in free variation with [t̚] (or simply [t]) in final position, as in /esaʔɨr/ (realized as [e.sa.ˈʔɨɾ] ~ [e.sa.ˈʔɨt̚], meaning "pupil").
  - It is represented in Navarro's orthography by ⟨r⟩, and sometimes at the end of a word by ⟨t⟩, as in ⟨ro'y⟩ ("cold") and ⟨xe r-a'yt!⟩ ("my son!").

== Typology ==
The following is a summary of the main characteristics of Classical Tupi, its typology and other distinguishing features.

- Tupi is a SOV language but was influenced by its Portuguese superstratum toward the latter's SVO,
- It presents a system of vowel symmetry where each of the six phonemic oral vowels has its nasal phonemic counterpart: /i/, /ĩ/; /ɨ/, /ɨ̃/; /u/, /ũ/; /ɛ/, /ɛ̃/; /ɔ/, /ɔ̃/; /a/, /ã/.
- Its consonantal inventory, on the other hand, is considered "relatively small".
- It is neither isolating, fusional, agglutinative or polysynthetic, rather displaying features of each, with none significantly more prevalent.
- There is no number, case or gender distinction in nouns.
- There are no marks of definiteness.
- It contains an inclusive first person plural (inclusive "we"), as well as an exclusive one, which does not include the listener.

== Pronouns ==
Tupi features clusivity, i.e., a distinction between inclusive (including the addressee) and exclusive (excluding the addressee) first-person pronouns. Personal pronouns in Tupi come in two series, each with its own uses.

Personal pronouns
1st series	2nd series	Translation
ixé	xe	I
endé	nde	You (sg.)
a'e*	i	He/she
oré	oré	We (exclusive)
îandé	îandé	We (inclusive)
peẽ	pe	You (pl.)
a'e*	i	They

* a'e means this/these or that/those, but it can also be used as a third-person personal pronoun, both singular and plural.

First series pronouns are generally used alone or along with verbs of the first class (those that are conjugated). For example: ixé a-karukatu: I ate well. Abápe morubixaba? – Ixé: who's the cacique? - I (am).

Second series pronouns are used in many different cases:

- alongside adjectives: xe porang, I'm beautiful.
- with verbs of the second class (see below): nde ma'enduar ixé resé, you remember me.
- in a genitive construction: i membyra, her son.

== Verbs ==
Old Tupi verbs are divided in two classes. First class are conjugated, with person markers coming at the beginning of the word. In addition, verbs can represent a present, past, or future action because, unlike Portuguese, they do not express time. (The future, in particular, is done by adding the particle -ne to the end of the sentence, but this does not change the fact that the verb itself does not express time.)

First class intransitive verbs
Pron.	karu (eat)	gûatá (walk)	ker (sleep)	pererek (jump)	nhan (run)	Translation
Ixé (I)	akaru	agûatá	aker	apererek	anhan	I eat/ate, walk/walked...
Endé (you)	erekaru	eregûatá	ereker	erepererek	erenhan	You eat/ate, walk/walked...
A'e (he*)	okaru	ogûatá	oker	opererek	onhan	He eats/ate, walks/walked...
Oré (we)	orokaru	orogûatá	oroker	oropererek	oronhan	We (exclusive) eat/ate, walk/walked...
Îandé (we)	îakaru	îagûatá	îaker	îapererek	îanhan	We (inclusive) eat/ate, walk/walked...
Peẽ (you)	pekaru	pegûatá	peker	pepererek	penhan	You (plural) eat/ate, walk/walked...
A'e (they*)	okaru	ogûatá	oker	opererek	onhan	They eat/ate, walk/walked...

Verbs from the second class are not conjugated and are used only with pronouns of the second series. This is because they are actually adjectives generally indicating a state or characteristic.

- xe ma'enduar (I remember)
- nde u'u (you cough) (sg.)
- i membyrar (she gives birth)
- oré rambûer (we fail) (excl.)
- îandé nhyrõ (we forgive) (incl.)
- pe poasem (you moan) (pl.)
- i pytu (they breathe)

=== Transitive verbs ===
Objects of transitive verbs in Old Tupi may come in many positions relative to the verb: either before, after or incorporated into it. In the last case, it comes after the person markers (a-, ere-, o-, etc.) in first class verbs, but before the root. For an example of incorporation:

- a-pirá-kutuk (I poke the fish)

a- is the first-person marker, pirá means fish and kutuk to poke.

When the object is not incorporated, then in it is replaced by a pleonastic third-person pronoun-i-, even if the object is present elsewhere in the phrase. Monosyllabic verbs use -îo- (or also -nho- close to nasals) instead of -i-, and a few others use -s- instead. Some examples:

- pirá a-î-kutuk (literally: the fish, I it poke) or a-î-kutuk pirá

The pronoun -i- is incorporated and becomes a diphthong.

- a-îo-mim (or a-nho-mim) u'ubá: I hide the arrow.

The monosyllabic nasal verb mim (to hide) has -îo- or -nho- incorporated.

- São Pedro itangapema o-s-ekyî: Saint Peter pulled the sword (itangapema).

The verb ekyî (to pull) requires -s- instead of -i-. From Anchieta, Catecismo na Língua Brasílica.

- pe-îuká îagûareté: you (pl.) killed the jaguar.

For îuká (to kill), the incorporated object is absorbed by the verb since it already begins with î.

=== Future ===
To express something happening in the future, the clitic -ne is always added to the last word in the sentence, independent of its grammatical class. This clitic has other meanings and may then be used as a particle in different positions.

- Abá kori ka'ape osóne. The indian will go to the woods today.
- Oro'u onhemongyraba'eramane. We shall eat what fattens us. (The verb here is oro'u, but -ne for expressing the future always goes at the end of the sentence.)
- Pytuna i ro'yne. The night shall be cold (there is no verb "to be" in Old Tupi)
- Kururu opererekypyne. The frog will begin (ypy) to jump (pererek)
- Pytuna o'aryne. The night will fall. (y is insterted between the verb and the clitic to avoid consonants meeting, which isn't possible in Old Tupi)

=== Verb moods ===
Tupi verbs are divided into its verbal and its nominal forms. Each division contains its respective verb moods.

Verb moods in Old Tupi
Verbal forms		Nominal forms	
INDICATIVE MOOD		WITH STRESSED OBJECT PRONOUNS	
ixé a-gûatá	I walk	(kori) xe gûatá / nhaní	(today) I walk/run
endé ere-gûatá	You (sg.) walk	(kori) i gûatá / nhaní	(today) you (sg.) walk/run
a'e o-gûatá	He/she walks	(kori) o gûatá / nhaní	(today) he/she walks/runs
oré oro-gûatá	We walk (excl.)	(kori) oré gûatá / nhaní	(today) we (excl.) walk/run
îandé îa-guatá	We walk (incl.)	(kori) îandé gûatá / nhaní	(today) we (incl.) walk/run
peẽ pe-guatá	You (pl.) walk	(kori) peẽ gûatá / nhaní	(today) you (pl.) walk/run
a'e o-guatá	They walk	(kori) îandé gûatá / nhaní	(today) we they walk/run
PERMISSIVE MOOD		WITH STRESSED OBJECT PRONOUNS	
ixé t'a-gûatá	may I walk	ixé oro-îuká	I kill you
endé t'ere-gûatá	may you (sg.) walk	xe îuká îepé	You kill me (subject: îepé)
a'e t'o-gûatá	may he/she walk	xe îûká a'e	he/she kills me
oré t'oro-gûatá	may we (excl.) walk	oré opo-îuká	we (excl.) kill you (pl.)
îandé t'îa-gûatá	may we (incl.) walk	îandé opo-îuká	we (incl.) kill you (pl.)
peẽ t'e pe-gûatá	may you (pl.) walk	xe îuká peîepé	You (pl.) kill me (subject: peîepé)
a'e t'o-gûatá	may they walk	xe oro-îuká a'e	They kill us
IMPERATIVE MOOD		INFINITIVE (OR NOUN FORM)	
(endé) e-gûatá!	walk (you (sg.))!	gûatá (the walk)	nhana (the run)
(peẽ) pe-gûatá!	walk (you (pl.))!	îuká (the killing)	tyma (the burial)
GERUND (INTRANSITIVE VERBS)		GERUND (TRANSITIVE VERBS)	
(ixé) gûi-gûatábo / gûi-nhana	(I) walking	(ixé) Pedro îukábo/tyma	(I) killing/burying Pedro
(endé) e-guatábo / e-nhana	(you (sg.)) walking/running	(endé) Pedro îukábo / tyma	(you (sg.)) killing/burying Pedro
(a'e) o-gûatábo / o-nhana	(he/she) walking/running	(a'e) Pedro îukábo / tyma	(he/she) killing/burying Pedro
oro-gûatábo / oro-nhana	(we (excl.)) walking/running	(oré) Pedro îukábo / tyma	(we (excl.)) killing/burying Pedro
îa-gûatábo / îa-nhana	(we (incl.)) walking/running	(îandé) Pedro îukábo / tyma	(we (incl.)) killing/burying Pedro
pe-gûatábo / pe-nhana	(you (pl.)) walking/running	(peẽ) Pedro îukábo / tyma	(you (pl.)) killing/burying Pedro
o-gûatábo / o-nhana	(they) walking/running	(a'e) Pedro îukábo / tyma	(they) killing/burying Pedro

== Nouns ==
All nouns in old Tupi end in a vowel. In the case of a verb or adjective substantivized, the suffix -a is added, if it does not already end in a vowel.

- Sem: to exit. Sema: the going out, the exit
- Pererek: to jump. Perereka: the jump, the leap.
- Só (verb): to go. Só (noun): the going, the going away.
- Porang: beautiful. Poranga: the beauty

The same occurs when a noun and an adjective are in composition. In this way:

- Kunhãporanga: beautiful woman (kunhã, woman; porang, beautiful; a, suffix)

=== Noun tenses ===
Unlike the Portuguese language, the tense of an action, in old Tupi, is expressed by the noun, not the verb. Such tenses are future, past and a time called "unreal", which is similar to the future perfect, of Portuguese. They are indicated, respectively, by the adjectives -ram, -pûer and -rambûer. These, when in composition with the noun, receive the suffix -a, as explained above.

- Future: ka'a-ram-a = forest that will be (that has not yet been born; ka'a means forest)
- Past: ka'a-pûer-a = forest that was (place where there is no more forest; hence the word capoeira)
- Unreal: ybyrá-rambûer-a = tree that would be (if it had not been cut down)

=== Augmentative and diminutive ===
The degrees of the noun (augmentative and diminutive) are made by the suffixes "-'ĩ' or '-'i'", for the diminutive, and "-ûasu' or '-usu'" for the augmentative (these suffixes may suffer several phonetic transformations. Here are some examples with their explanations:

Diminutive		Augmentative	
-'ĩ or -'i		-ûasu or -usu	
Gûyra'ĩ	Little bird	'Ygûasu	Big river ('y means river; the g was added later by the colonizers)
Ita'ĩ	Pebbles (ita means stone)	Kunumĩgûasu	Young man
Pitangĩ	Little child, baby (Child is pitanga)	Ybytyrusu	Mountain range (from ybytyra, mountain)

== Numerals ==
In Old Tupi, there are only numerals from one to four, both cardinal and ordinal, as the need for mathematical precision was small in a primitive economy. Cardinal numerals can either come after or before the noun they refer to, while ordinals only come after. For example, in the case of cardinal numbers, mokõî pykasu and pykasu mokõî are equivalent terms, meaning "two pigeons". In the case of ordinals, ta'yr-ypy means "first son (of a man)" and 'ara mosapyra means "third day".

Cardinal numbers		Ordinal numbers	
1	oîepé	1st	ypy
2	mokõî	2nd	mokõîa
3	mosapyr	3rd	mosapyra
4	(oîo)irundyk (little used) (Note: According to Lemos Barbosa, there was no exact translation for "four", so irundyk and its variants were little used.)	4th	(oîo)irundyka (little used)

== Postpositions ==
They are the same as prepositions, but they come after the term they refer to. They are divided into unstressed postpositions, which are appended to the previous word, and stressed postpositions, which are written separately.

Postposition	Meaning	Example	Notes
suí	from (origin)	Morubixaba osem taba suí The leader left the village	
supé	to (a person)	Abá onhe'eng Maria supé The Indian speaks to Maria.	
-pe	in, to (place)	Ixé asó Nhoesembé-pe; I went to Nhoesembé	Unstressed postposition
pupé	inside, with (instrumental)	Kunumĩ oîkó ygara pupé The boy is in the boat	
resé	for, in favor of	Tuba oma'ẽ o a'yra resé The father looks at his son	Postposition with several meanings

Just like in Portuguese or English, some verbs require certain postpositions:

- Pedo osykyîé o sy suí (Peter is afraid of his mother; the verb sykyîé requires the preposition suí)
- Tuba oma'ẽ o a'yra resé (The father looks at his son; the verb ma'ẽ requires resé)

== Negation ==
There are many ways to negate a sentence in Old Tupi.

=== na ... i ===
Used to negate verbs in the indicative mood. Before a vowel, na just becomes n.

- n'a-syk-i: I didn't arrive
- n'ere-só-î: you (sg.) didn't go
- n'o-karuî: he/she didn't eat
- n'oro-petymbu-î: we (excl.) didn't smoke
- n'îa-nhe'eng-i: we (incl.) didn't speak
- na pe-'ytab-i: you (pl) didn't swim
- n'o-sykyîé-î: they don't fear

The same rule applies for adjectives:

- Xe porang (I'm beautiful)
- Na xe porang-i (I'm not beautiful)
- I puku (he/she is tall)
- N'i puku-î (he/she isn't tall)

=== -e'ym(a) ===
Negates verbs in the infinitive or gerund form.

- Kunhã osepyîak pitanga ker-e'yma
- The woman sees that the child doesn't sleep (literally: the woman sees the not sleeping of the child)

=== na ... ruã ===
Used to negate a noun, pronoun or an adverb.

- Îagûara ixé (I'm the jaguar)
- Na îagûara ruã ixé (I'm not the jaguar)

=== na ... i xué ===
Negates sentences in the future. The clitic -ne is still used.

- N'asóî xué nde tápe korine
- I won't go to your village today
- Kunimĩ n'okuruki xuéne
- The boy won't grumble

=== umẽ or ymẽ ===
Negates verbs in the imperative and permissive moods.

- Eporapiti umẽ!
- Don't kill people! (from Anchieta, Catecismo na Língua Brasílica)
- Tosepîaky bé umẽ kûarasy
- Let they not see the sun anymore. (from Anchieta, Teatro)

== Grammatical structure ==
Tupi was an agglutinative language with moderate degree of fusional features (nasal mutation of stop consonants in compounding, the use of some prefixes and suffixes), although Tupi is not a polysynthetic language.

Tupi parts of speech did not follow the same conventions of Indo-European languages:

- Verbs are "conjugated" for person (by means of prepositioning subject or object pronouns) but not for tense or mood (the very notion of mood is absent). All verbs are in the present tense.
- Nouns are "declined" for tense by means of suffixing the aspect marker (Nominal TAM) but not for gender or number.
- There is a distinction of nouns in two classes: "higher" (for things related to human beings or spirits) and "lower" (for things related to animals or inanimate beings). The usual manifestation of the distinction was the use of the prefixes t- for high-class nouns and s- for low-class ones, so that tesá meant "human eye", and sesá meant "the eye of an animal". Some authors argue that it is a type of gender inflection.
- Adjectives cannot be used in the place of nouns, neither as the subject nor as the object nucleus (in fact, they cannot be used alone).

Tupi had a split-intransitive grammatical alignment. Verbs were preceded by pronouns, which could be subject or object forms. Subject pronouns like a- "I" expressed the person was in control, while object pronouns like xe- "me" signified the person was not. The two types could be used alone or combined in transitive clauses, and they then functioned like subject and object in English:

- A-bebé = I-fly, "I fly", "I flew".
- Xe pysyka = me catch, "Someone has caught me" or "I'm caught".
- A-î-pysyk = I-him-catch, "I have caught him".

Although Tupi verbs were not inflected, a number of pronominal variations existed to form a rather complex set of aspects regarding who did what to whom. That, together with the temporal inflection of the noun and the presence of tense markers like koára "today," made up a fully functional verbal system.

Word order played a key role in the formation of meaning:

- Xe ma'enduar nde resé. = I remember you
- Nde resé xe ma'enduári. = It's of you that I remember. (Notice how the verb must change form to the "Circunstacial mood", shifting the focus to the adverbial phrase.)

Tupi had no means to inflect words for gender, so used adjectives instead. Some of these were:

- apŷaba = man, male
- kunhã = woman, female
- kunumĩ = boy, young male
- kunhãtaĩ = girl, young female
- mena = male animal
- kunhã = female animal

The notion of gender was expressed, once again, together with the notion of age and that of "humanity" or "animality".

The notion of plural was also expressed by adjectives or numerals:

- abá = man; abá-etá = many men

Unlike Indo-European languages, nouns were not implicitly masculine except for those provided with natural gender: abá "man" and kunhã[taĩ] "woman/girl"; for instance.

Without proper verbal inflection, all Tupi sentences were in the present or in the past. When needed, tense is indicated by adverbs like kó 'ara, "this day", kori "later today", oîe'i "earlier today", kûesé "yesterday", oîrã "tomorrow", etc.

Adjectives and nouns, however, had temporal inflection:

- abapûera "he who was once a man"
- abarama "he who shall be a man someday"

That was often used as a semantic derivation process:

- akanga "head"
- akangûera "skull" (of a skeleton)
- abá "man"
- abárama "teenager"

With respect to syntax, Tupi was mostly SOV, but word order tended to be free, as the presence of pronouns made it easy to tell the subject from the object. Nevertheless, native Tupi sentences tended to be quite short, as the Indians were not used to complex rhetorical or literary uses.

Most of the available data about Old Tupi are based on the tupinambá dialect, spoken in what is now the Brazilian state of São Paulo, but there were other dialects as well.

According to Edward Sapir's categories, Old Tupi could be characterized as follows:

1. With respect to the concepts expressed: complex, of pure relation, that is, it expresses material and relational content by means of affixes and word order, respectively.
2. With respect to the manner in which such concepts are expressed: a) fusional-agglutinative, b) symbolic or of internal inflection (using reduplication of syllables, functionally differentiated).
3. With respect to the degree of cohesion of the semantic elements of the sentence: synthetic.

== Vocabulary ==
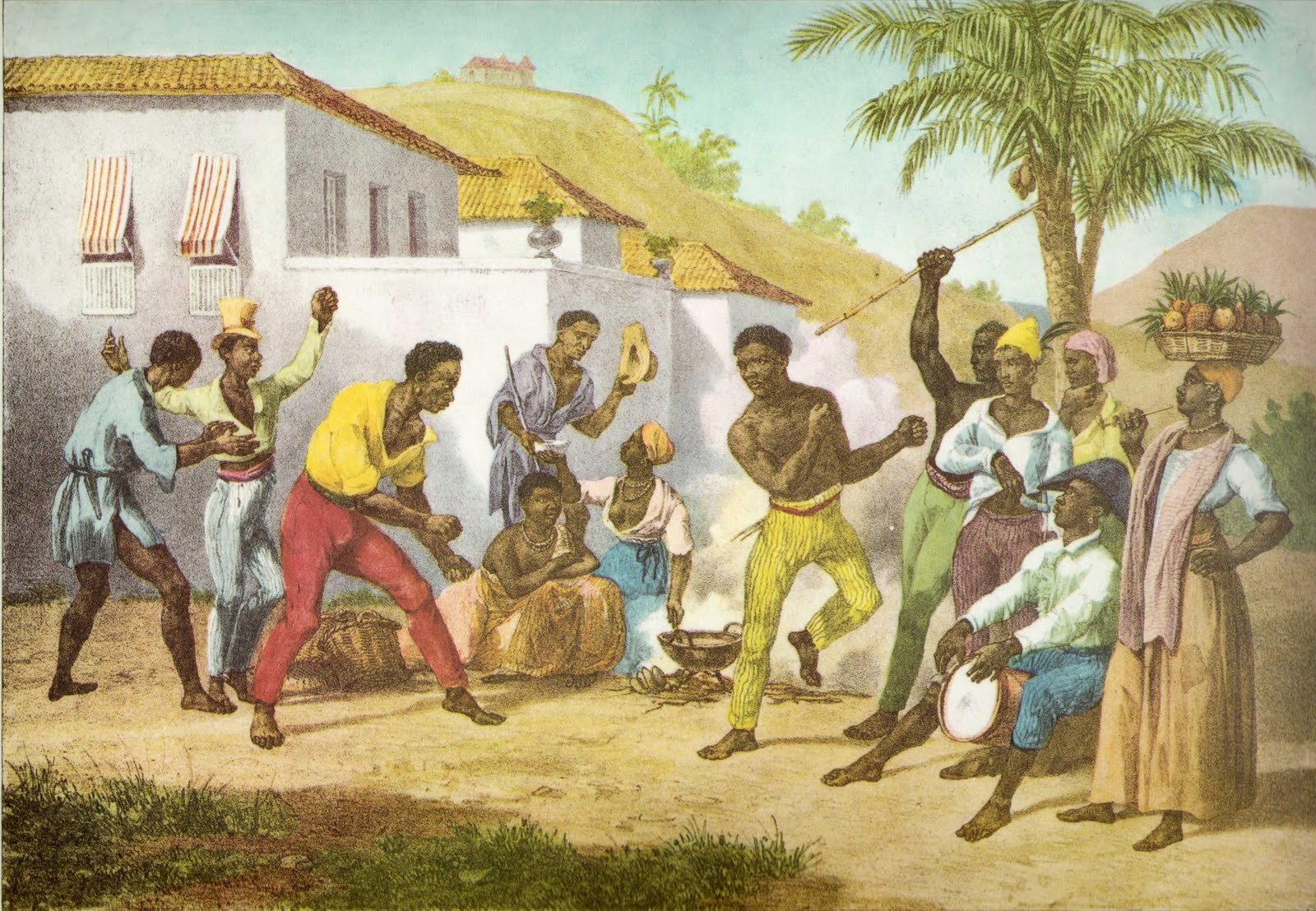
Although the martial art is of African origin, the word "capoeira" comes from Tupi, more precisely from ka'a-pûer-a, which means "forest that was". Painting by Johann Moritz Rugendas (1835)

Colors

- îub = yellow, golden
- (s)oby = blue, green
- pirang = red
- ting = white
- (s)un = black

Substances

- (t)atá = fire
- itá = rock, stone, metal,
- 'y = water, river
- yby = earth, ground
- ybytu = air, wind

People

- abá = man (as opposed to woman), Indian or Native-American (as opposed to European), human being (as opposed to the animal world)
- aîuruîuba = Frenchman (literally "yellow parrot", due to the blond hair color)
- maíra = Frenchman (the name of a mythological figure that the Indians associated with the Frenchmen)
- karaíba = foreigner, white man (literally means "spirit of a dead person"). Means also prophet.
- kunhã = woman
- kunhãtã'ĩ = girl
- kunhãmuku = young woman
- kunumĩ = boy
- kunumĩgûasu = young man
- morubixaba = chief
- peró = Portuguese (neologism, from "Pero", old variant of "Pedro" = "Peter", a common Portuguese name)
- sy = mother
- tapy'yîa = slave (also the term for non-Tupi speaking Indians)

The body

- akanga = head
- îuru = mouth
- îybá = arm
- nambi = ear
- mbó = hand
- mby = foot
- mby'a = heart
- (t)esá = eye
- (t)etimã = leg
- tĩ = nose
- (t)obá = face

Animals

Tupi plays a huge role in the naming of many South American animals introduced to European knowledge and/or borrowed into their languages:

- a'y = sloth (Portuguese: aí, aígue; French: aï)
- aîuru = parrot, lory, lorykeet
- arara = macaw, parrot
- îagûara = jaguar
- heira = tayra
- îararaka = jararaca, yarará, a bothrops snake
- ka'apiûara = capybara
- koati = coati
- mboîa = snake, cobra
- paka = paca
- pirá = fish
- so'ó = game (animal)
- tapi'ira = tapir
- tukana = toucan
- tatu = armadillo (Portuguese: tatu, French: tatou)

Plants

- ka'api = grass, ivy (from which the word capybara comes)
- ka'a = plant, wood, forest
- kuri = pine
- (s)oba = leaf
- yba = fruit
- ybá = plant
- ybyrá = tree, (piece of) wood
- ybotyra = flower

Society

- oka = house
- taba = village

Adjectives

- beraba = brilliant, gleamy, shiny
- katu = good
- mirĩ, 'í = little
- panema = barren, contaminated, unhealthy, unlucky
- poranga = beautiful
- pûera, ûera = bad, old, dead
- (s)etá = many, much
- ûasu, usu = big

== Sample texts ==
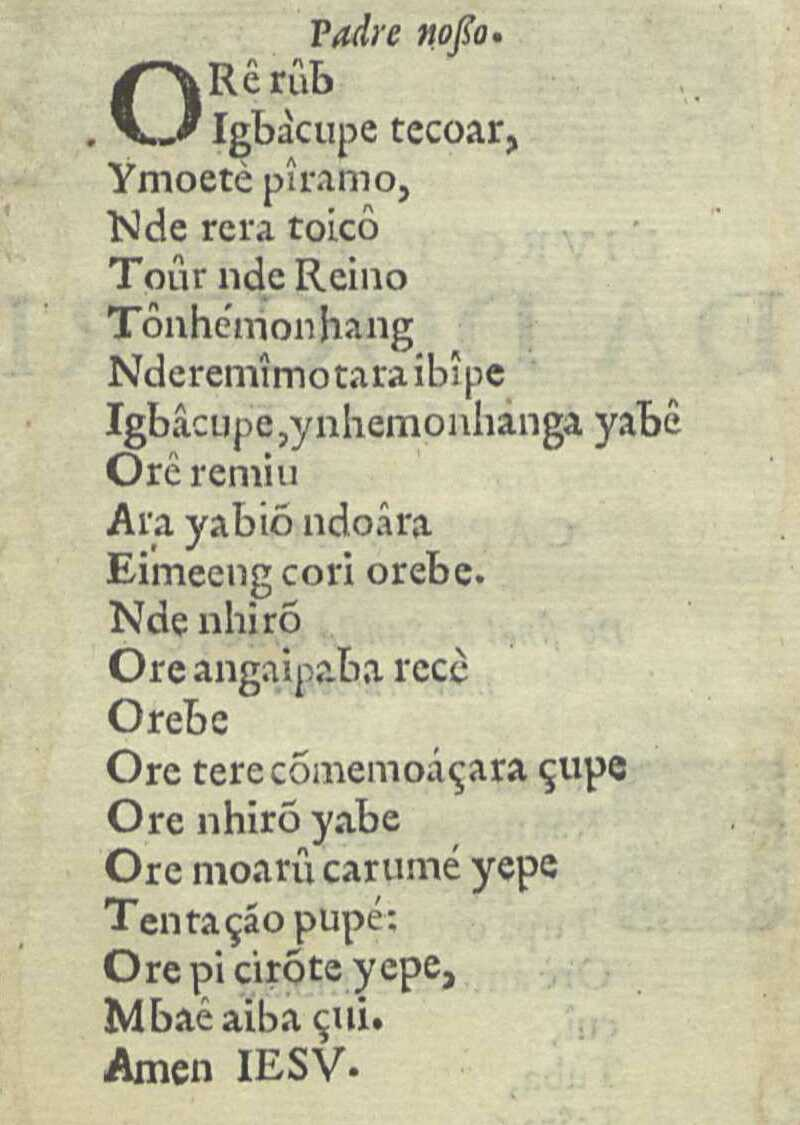
The Lord's Prayer as in the Catechism in the Brasílica Language (1618)

=== Basic phrases ===
Here are some basic phrases in Old Tupi, some of which were attested by Europeans like Jean de Léry and Yves d'Évreux during the 16th century.

- Abápe endé? (Who are you?)
- Mamõ suípe ereîur? (Where do you come from?)
- Mamõpe ereîkó? (Where do you live?)
- Marãpe nde rera? (What's your name?)
- Tiá nde karuka! (Good afternoon!)
- Tiá nde ko'ema! (Good morning!)
- Tiá nde pytuna! (Good night!)

=== Lord's Prayer ===
This is the Lord's Prayer in Tupi, according to Anchieta in his Catecismo na língua brasílica.

Old tupi	Literal Portuguese translation by Eduardo Navarro	Literal English translation	English (NIV)
Oré rub, ybakype tekoar,	Nosso pai, o que está no céu,	Our father, the one in heaven,	Our Father in heaven,
i moetepyramo nde rera t'oîkó.	como o que é louvado teu nome esteja.	as the one hallowed your name may be.	hallowed be your name,
T'our nde "Reino"!	Que venha teu Reino!	May your kingdom come!	your kingdom come,
T'onhemonhang nde remimotara	Que se faça tua vontade	May your will be done,	your will be done,
ybype,	na terra,	on earth,	on earth
ybakype i nhemonhanga îabé!	como o fazer-se dela no céu!	as the doing of it in heaven!	as it is in heaven.
Oré remi'u, 'ara îabi'õndûara, eîme'eng kori orébe.	Nossa comida, a que é de cada dia, dá hoje para nós,	Our food, which is every day, give us today,	Give us today our daily bread.
Nde nhyrõ oré angaîpaba resé orébe,	Perdoa tu nossos pecados a nós,	Forgive you our sins for us,	And forgive us our debts,
oré rerekomemûãsara supé	como aos que nos tratam mal	as for those who mistreat us	as we also have forgiven our debtors.
oré nhyrõ îabé.	nós perdoamos.	we forgive.
Oré mo'arukar umẽ îepé "tentação" pupé,	Não nos deixes tu fazer cair em tentação,	Don't let us you fall into temptation,	And lead us not into temptation,
oré pysyrõte îepé mba'eaíba suí.	mas livra-nos tu das coisas más.	but free us you from bad things.	but deliver us from evil.

Notice that two Portuguese words, Reino (Kingdom) and tentação (temptation) have been borrowed, as such concepts would be rather difficult to express with pure Tupi words.

== Influence ==
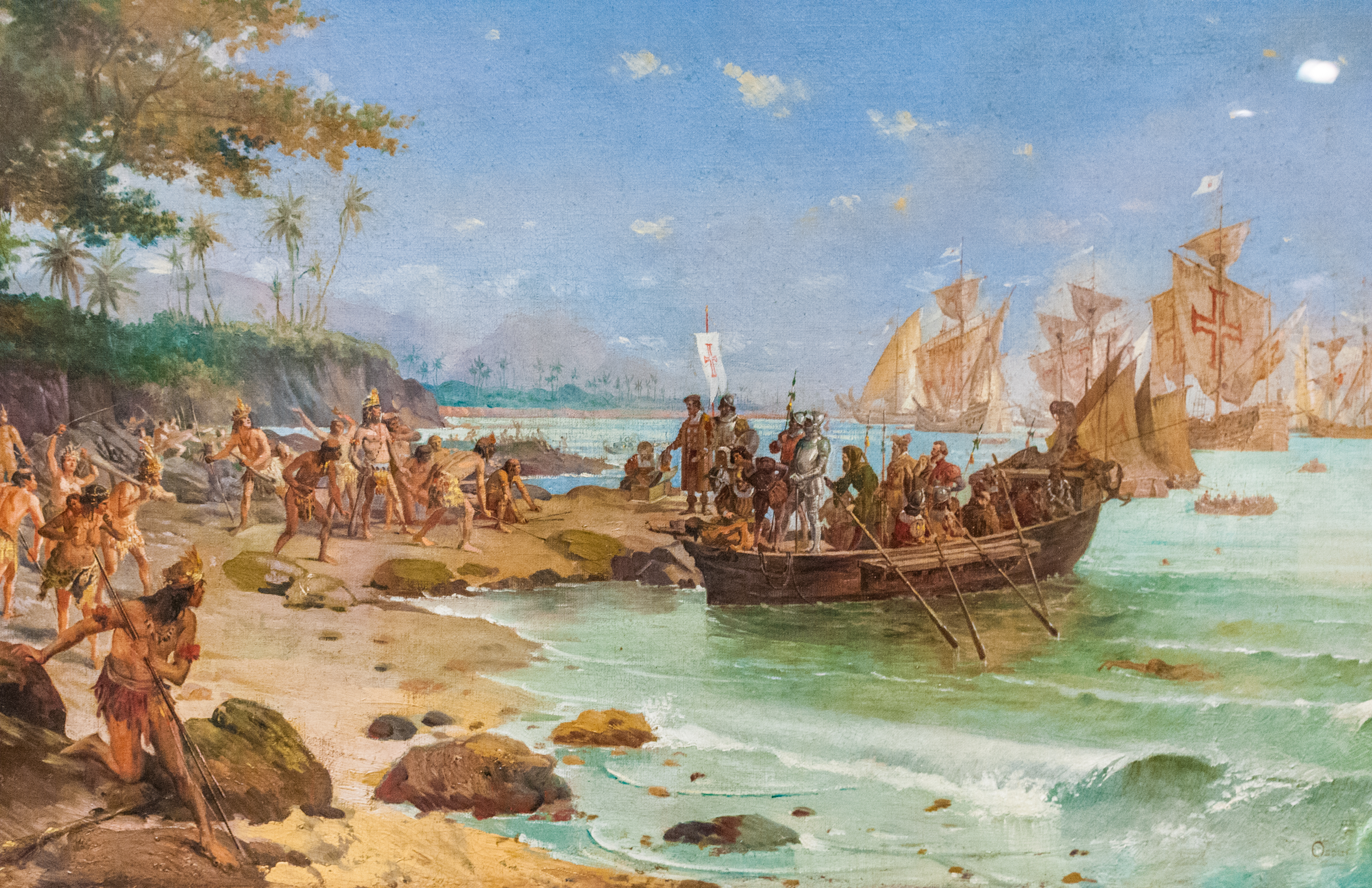
Painting portraying the arrival of Pedro Álvares Cabral and his crew at Porto Seguro in 1500. They quickly found natives and tried to communicate, all recorded by Pero Vaz de Caminha to Manuel I of Portugal.

As the basis for the língua geral, spoken throughout the country by white settlers and Indigenous people alike until the early 18th century, and still heard in isolated pockets until the early 20th century, Tupi left a strong mark on the Portuguese language of Brazil.

Tupi has given the Portuguese language:

- A few thousand words (some of them hybrids or corrupted) for animals, plants, fruit and cultural entities.
- Multiple names of locations, including states (e.g. Paraná, Pará, Paraíba)

Some municipalities which have Tupi names:

- Iguaçu ('y ûasú): great river
- Ipanema ('y panema): bad, fishless water
- Itanhangá (itá + añãgá): devil's rock
- Itaquaquecetuba (takûakesétyba, from itá + takûara + kesé + tyba): where bamboo knives are made
- Itaúna ("itá + una"): black rock
- Jaguariúna (îagûara + 'í + una): small black jaguar
- Pacaembu (paka + embu): valley of the pacas.
- Paraíba (pará + aíba): bad to navigation or "bad river"
- Paranaíba (paranãíba, from paranã + aíba): dangerous sea
- Paraná-mirim (paranã + mirĩ): salty lagoon (literally: "small sea")
- Pindorama (from pindó, "palm tree", and (r)etama, country): palm country. Today this is used to refer to the country of Brazil, but this use (or any other referring to the whole region natives lived in) is not attested in Old Tupi.
- Piracaia ("pirá" + "caia"): fried fish
- Piraí (pirá + y): "fish water"
- Umuarama (ũbuarama, from ũbu + arama): where the cacti will grow

Among the many Tupi loanwords in Portuguese, the following are noteworthy for their widespread use:

- abacaxi (pineapple, literally: "fruit with thorns")
- jacaré (caiman)
- mirim (small or juvenile) as in "escoteiro-mirim" ("Boy Scout")
- perereca (a type of small frog, also slang for vulva), literally: "hopper"
- peteca (a type of badminton game played with bare hands) literally: "slap"
- piranha (a carnivorous fish, also slang for immoral women) literally: "toothed fish"
- pipoca (popcorn) literally "explosion of skin"
- piroca (originally meaning "bald", now a slang term for penis)
- pororoca (a tidal phenomenon in the Amazon firth) literally: "confusion"
- siri (crab)
- sucuri (anaconda)
- urubu (the Brazilian vulture)
- urutu (a kind of poisonous snake)
- uruçu (the common name for Melipona scutellaris)

It is interesting, however, that two of the most distinctive Brazilian animals, the jaguar and the tapir, are best known in Portuguese by non-Tupi names, onça and anta, despite being named in English with Tupi loanwords.

A significant number of Brazilians have Tupi names as well:

- Araci (female): ara sy, "mother of the day"
- Bartira, Potira (female): Ybotyra, "flower"
- Iara (female): 'y îara, lady of the lake
- Jaci (unisex): îasy, the moon
- Janaína (female): îandá una, a type of black bird
- Ubirajara (male): ybyrá îara, "lord of the trees/lance"
- Ubiratã (male): ybyrá-atã, "hard wood"

Some names of distinct Native American ancestry have obscure etymology because the tupinambá, like the Europeans, cherished traditional names which sometimes had become archaic. Some of such names are Moacir (reportedly meaning "son of pain") and Moema.

== Literature ==
Old Tupi literature was composed mainly of religious and grammatical texts developed by Jesuit missionaries working among the colonial Brazilian people. The greatest poet to express in written Tupi language, and its first grammarian was José de Anchieta, who wrote over eighty poems and plays, compiled at his Lírica Portuguesa e Tupi. Later Brazilian authors, writing in Portuguese, employed Tupi in the speech of some of their characters.

== See also ==
- Jesuit Reductions
- Língua Geral
- List of Brazil state name etymologies

== Bibliography ==
- Anchieta, José de (2004). Navarro, Eduardo de Almeida (ed.). Poemas: lírica portuguese e tupi [Poems: Portuguese and Tupi lyric]. Poetas do Brasil (in Portuguese) (2nd ed.). São Paulo: Martins Fontes. ISBN 85-336-1956-1.
- Barbosa, Antônio Lemos (1956). Curso de tupi antigo: gramática, exercícios, textos [Course of Old Tupi: grammar, exercises, texts] (in Portuguese). Rio de Janeiro: Livraria São José. Archived from the original on 28 January 2026.
- Cruz, Aline da (2011). Fonologia e Gramática do Nheengatú: a língua geral falada pelos povos Baré, Warekena e Baniwa [Phonology and Grammar of Nheengatú: the general language spoken by the Baré, Warekena, and Baniwa peoples] (in Portuguese). Utrecht: LOT. ISBN 978-94-6093-063-8. Archived from the original on 11 February 2026.
- Edelweiss, Frederico G. (1969). Estudos tupis e tupi-guaranis: confrontos e revisões [Tupi and Tupi–Guarani studies: confrontations and revisions] (in Portuguese). Rio de Janeiro: Livraria Brasiliana Editôra.
- Edelweiss, Frederico G. (1969). "Gûasú e usú na diacronia das línguas e dialetos tupi-guaranis" [Gûasú and usú in the diachrony of Tupi–Guarani languages and dialects]. Revista do Instituto de Estudos Brasileiros (in Portuguese) (7): 33–45. doi:10.11606/issn.2316-901X.v0i7p33-45.
- Edelweiss, Frederico G. (1970). ""Gûasú", "usú" e "asú" na história da missão dos pp. capuchinhos de frei Cláudio d'Abbeville" ["Gûasú", "usú", and "asú" in the history of the mission of the Capuchin Fathers of Friar Claude d'Abbeville]. Revista do Instituto de Estudos Brasileiros (in Portuguese) (9): 65–80. doi:10.11606/issn.2316-901X.v0i9p65-80.
- Gerardi, Fabrício Ferraz (2023). A Role and Reference Grammar Description of Tupinambá. Tübingen Library Publishing. doi:10.15496/publikation-83610. hdl:10900/142263. ISBN 978-3-946552-85-7. Archived from the original on 9 December 2025.
- Navarro, Eduardo de Almeida (2005). Método moderno de tupi antigo: a língua do Brasil dos primeiros séculos [Modern method of Old Tupi: the language of Brazil of the first centuries] (in Portuguese) (3rd ed.). São Paulo: Global. ISBN 85-260-1058-1.
- Navarro, Eduardo de Almeida (2013). Dicionário de tupi antigo: a língua indígena clássica do Brasil [Dictionary of Old Tupi: the classical Indigenous language of Brazil ] (in Portuguese) (1st ed.). São Paulo: Global. ISBN 978-85-260-1933-1.
- Navarro, Eduardo de Almeida (2022). "Transcrição e tradução integral anotada das cartas dos índios Camarões, escritas em 1645 em tupi antigo" [Complete annotated transcription and translation of the letters of the Camarão Indians, written in 1645 in Old Tupi]. Boletim do Museu Paraense Emílio Goeldi (in Portuguese). 17 (3). Belém. doi:10.1590/2178-2547-BGOELDI-2021-0034. Archived from the original on 7 December 2024.
- "Resumo der Tupinambá-Sprache, de Aryon Rodrigues" [Summary of the Phonologie der Tupinambá-Sprache, by Aryon Rodrigues] (in Portuguese). 31 May 2024. Archived from the original on 25 January 2026.
- Anchieta, José de (1990). Arte de gramática da língua mais usada na costa do Brasil (in Portuguese). São Paulo: Edições Loyola. ISBN 85-15-00171-3.
- Anchieta, José de (2006). Teatro (in Portuguese). Translated by Navarro, Eduardo de Almeida (2nd ed.). São Paulo: Martins Fontes. ISBN 85-336-2142-6.
- Edelweiss, Frederico G. Tupis e Guaranis, Estudos de Etnonímia e Lingüística. Salvador: Museu do Estado da Bahia, 1947. 220 p.
- Edelweiss, Frederico G. O caráter da segunda conjugação tupi. Bahia: Livraria Progresso Editora, 1958. 157 p.
- Lemos Barbosa, A. Pequeno Vocabulário Tupi–Português. Rio de Janeiro: Livraria São José, 1951.
- Lemos Barbosa, A. Pequeno vocabulário Tupi–Português. Rio de Janeiro: Livraria São José, 1955. (3ª ed.: Livraria São José, Rio de Janeiro, 1967)
- Lemos Barbosa, A. Pequeno vocabulário Português-Tupi. Rio de Janeiro: Livraria São José, 1970.
- Rodrigues, Aryon Dall'Igna. Morfologia do Verbo Tupi. Separata de "Letras". Curitiba, 1953.
- Rodrigues, Aryon Dall'Igna. Descripción del tupinambá en el período colonial: el arte de José de Anchieta. Colóquio sobre a descrição das línguas ameríndias no período colonial. Ibero-amerikanisches Institut, Berlim.
- Sampaio, Teodoro. O Tupi na Geografia Nacional. São Paulo: Editora Nacional, 1987. 360 p.
