= Luís Figueira =

Portuguese missionary (c. 1575 – 1643)

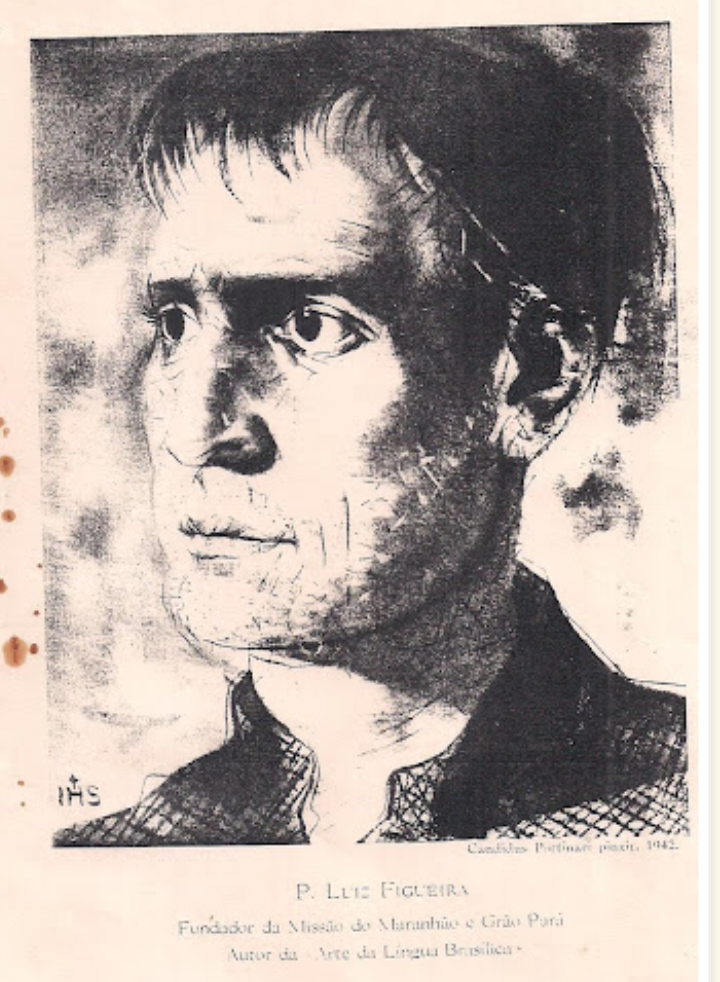
Luís Figueira by Candido Portinari

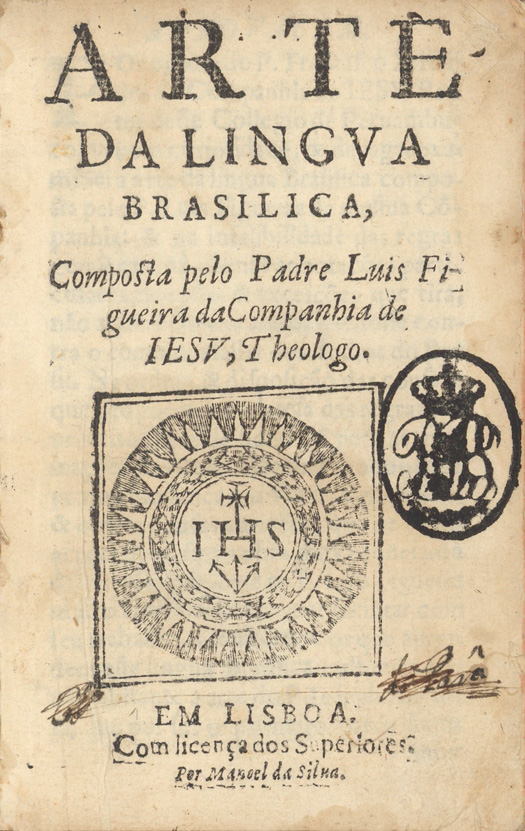
Frontispiece of Figueira's Art of the Brasílica Language

Luís Figueira (born between 1574 and 1576 – died 1643) was a Portuguese Jesuit missionary and author of the Art of the Brasílica Language, a grammar of the Old Tupi language.

== Life ==
Born in Almodôvar between the years 1574 and 1576, Figueira entered the Society of Jesus on 22 January 1592, at the Colégio do Espírito Santo in Évora. In 1602, he embarked for Salvador, Bahia; there, residing at the College of Bahia, Figueira had contact with the Old Tupi language, also through Francisco Pinto, who was his teacher in this regard. According to Jacinto de Carvalho, it was thanks to Pinto that Figueira was able to compose his Art of the Brasílica Language, a work through which one "learns [Old Tupi] with great ease and perfection". Between 1607 and 1608, Figueira undertook, alongside Pinto, an expedition with 60 Indians to Maranhão. Pinto was killed on 10 January 1608, by other Indians instigated by the French. Figueira hid and was saved by Gaspar de Samperes. He left an account of this expedition called Relação da missão do Maranhão.

== Death ==
Luís Figueira was returning from Portugal to Brazil in 1643 when, from 29 to 30 June, the ship he was on sank. He refused to board the boat where some survivors were taking refuge and preferred to provide spiritual assistance to those who remained. Figueira ended up being killed on Marajó Island by a group of Aruã, an Arawak people.

== See also ==
- History of Ceará

== Bibliography ==
- Magalhães, Pablo Antonio Iglesias (2011). "A palavra e o império: a Arte da lingua brasilica e a conquista do Maranhão" [The word and the empire: the Art of the Brasilica Language and the conquest of Maranhão]. Revista de História (in Portuguese) (165). doi:10.11606/issn.2316-9141.v0i165p367-401. Archived from the original on 27 February 2023.
- Nimuendajú, C. (1948). "The Turiwara and Aruã" (PDF). In Steward, J.H. (ed.). Handbook of South American Indians. Vol. 3: The Tropical Forest Tribes. Washington, D.C.: Smithsonian Institution. pp. 195–198.
