= Tesoro de la lengua guaraní =

Old Guarani–Spanish dictionary

Thesaurus of the Guarani Language
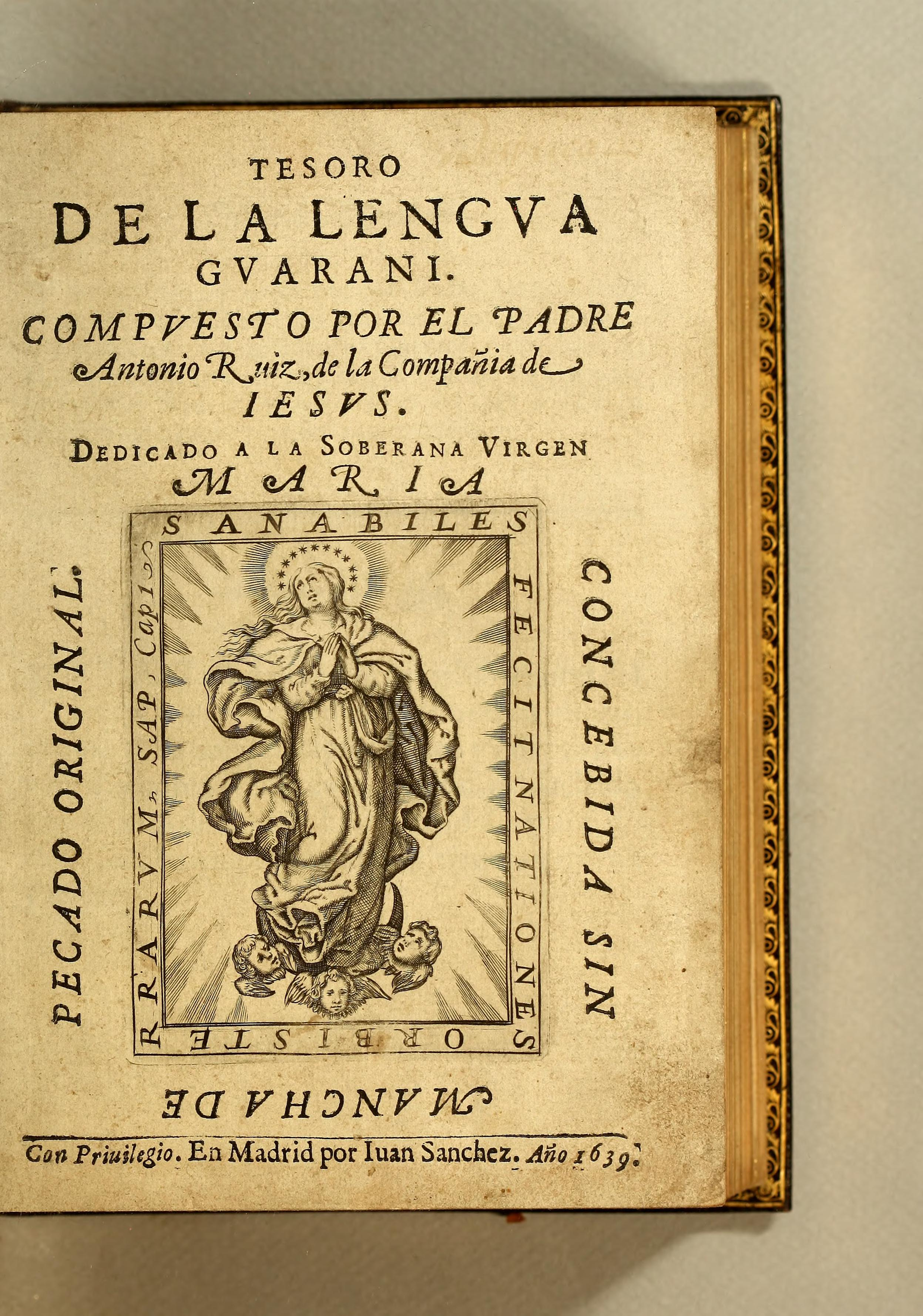
- Frontispiece
- Original title: Tesoro de la lengua guaraní
- Language: Old Guarani and Spanish
- Publication date: 1639
- Publication place: Spain
- Original text: Tesoro de la lengua guaraní at Internet Archive

The Thesaurus of the Guarani Language (Spanish: Tesoro de la lengua guaraní) is a Classical Guarani–Spanish bilingual dictionary written by the Peruvian Jesuit priest and scholar Antonio Ruiz de Montoya. It was published in 1639. The Thesaurus was the first Guarani–Spanish dictionary. It gives examples of contexts in which to use the various words.
