= Etymology of carioca =

Origin of the name 'carioca'

Those born in Rio de Janeiro are called Cariocas, a name that originally refers to a stream and an ancient village in Guanabara Bay. According to Frederico Edelweiss, the name at first referred to a Carijó dwelling, which was transformed over time into a village, and then passed to the stream.

There are a large number of proposed etymological origins for the term Carioca, the demonym for those from Rio de Janeiro, Brazil; some are morphologically defensible, while others are not. Carioca is a stream in Rio de Janeiro and the name of an ancient village in the city, mentioned in at least two 16th-century primary sources, Jean de Léry and Joseph of Anchieta. According to Frederico Edelweiss, the explanation of the name in Léry's work refutes the etymologies proposed by the majority of etymologists, while its occurrence in Anchieta puts an end to any ambiguity. Both Edelweiss and Eduardo de Almeida Navarro agree on the meaning of the Old Tupi word Carioca: 'Carijó house', referring to Guarani-speaking Indians scattered from the coast of Brazil to Paraguay. Over time, the name of the village also came to refer to those born in the city of Rio de Janeiro.

The interpretation of the name as 'white man house' was first proposed by Varnhagen and, according to Edelweiss, its inadmissibility reveals he "understands little or nothing" of Tupi.

== Background ==
Carioca is a stream in Rio de Janeiro and the name of an ancient Indigenous village in Guanabara Bay, the one closest to the village of São Sebastião, founded by Estácio de Sá. The first record of the name Carioca in Portuguese occurs in the 1560s, by Luís da Grã, as a toponym: "os que vyerão da Carioca". (Note: "those who came from Carioca") Still during the colonial period of Brazil, the name came to designate those born in Rio de Janeiro; Eduardo de Almeida Navarro provides a 1789 citation: "os Cariocas e Americanos eram fracos, vis, patifes e pusillanimes", (Note: "the Cariocas and Americans were weak, vile, rascals, and pusillanimous") contained in a letter denouncing Tiradentes. It is not derogatory today. According to Serafim Leite, the designation Carioca was current in 1563, the name having been applied to a "stream", "spring", and "water" (water from the "carioca"). According to the Houaiss Dictionary of the Portuguese Language, the toponym, initially Carioca, later became "Largo da Carioca", a place where there was a water source for supplying water to the public and to vessels, and from there eventually came to refer to the inhabitants of the city of Rio de Janeiro, who were nicknamed Cariocas "from 1723 onward".

== Etymology ==
Proto-Tupi *ekʷ ('house')
Proto-Tupi–Guarani *ok ('house')	Old Tupi -a (nominal suffix)
Old Tupi kariîó ('Carijó')	Old Tupi oka ('house')
Old Tupi Kariîooka (lit. 'Carijó house')

Carioca means 'Carijó house'. It derives from Old Tupi, being composed of the words kariîó and oka, and is nowadays written as Kariîooka or Karioka. Frederico Edelweiss argues the name originally referred to a dwelling of a Carijó or of Carijó Indians, which was transformed over time into a village; the stream eventually took its name from the village. The word oka comes from Proto-Tupi–Guarani term *ok (also reconstructed as *ók and *oK), ultimately from Proto-Tupi term *ekʷ (also *əK); (Note: Corrêa-da-Silva and Nikulin provide intermediate reconstructions.) the final -a is a suffix of nominalization.

The Carijós were Guarani-speaking Indians who, according to Joseph of Anchieta, were scattered "everywhere". According to Fernão Cardim, there were "an infinity of them", and they ranged "along the seacoast" of São Vicente "and inland as far as Paraguay". In a scene from Anchieta's Play of Saint Lawrence, two words in Guarani occur, to which the other character reacts by asking in Spanish: "¿Vinisteis del Paraguay, que habláis en carijó?". (Note: "Did you come from Paraguay, that you speak in Carijó?")

== Occurrences in primary sources ==
=== In Jean de Léry ===
Explanation of the etymology in Léry's 1578 book

Kariauc in Léry

Jean de Léry preserved in chapter 20 of his book the names of the principal villages in Guanabara Bay, from two distinct but closely spaced periods. According to information in the preceding chapter, the Tupi colloquy transcribed in chapter 20 was composed with the assistance of a French interpreter, who was well educated, as he knew Greek, and who had lived for seven to eight years among the Tupinambá and had a good knowledge of their language. The interpreter was a native of Rouen (Léry, of Lamargelle), according to his own statement to the hypothetical Tupinambá in the dialogue. The oldest toponyms are attributed to the interpreter: eight villages on the left side, five on the right side, and six farther inland. After the colloquy, Léry, for reasons little explained, made a new, updated list of the villages of Guanabara, in order to reinforce the credibility of his "adventure", enumerating 22 villages: 14 on the left side, of which only two appear in the earlier list; three on the right side, of which two appear in the earlier account; and three on Governador Island, out of a total of five, none of which appear in the older list.

The name of the Indigenous village of Carioca appears three times in Léry's book: twice in isolation and once combined with the locative preposition be: Kariauh, Kariauh-be, and Kariauc. According to Frederico Edelweiss, in the first two occurrences, letters were transposed, with an h appearing in place of k. Edelweiss argues this was the result of a copying error and careless proofreading, compounded by lapses in Léry's memory. For him, after the 20-year interval between Léry's return and the printing of his work, it is not impossible he had difficulty deciphering his own handwriting. Following one of the occurrences, the book provides an explanation:

In this village, so called, which is the name of a stream, from which the village takes its name, being situated nearby. — It translates as Kario(s) (Note: Léry pluralized karió by adding an s. Tupi has no plural ending.) house, composed of the word Karios and auq, which is house. Removing os and adding auq, we obtain Kariauh.

The combination of karios and auq would yield kariauq or kariauk, but not *kariauh. According to Edelweiss, the graphic divergences and the conflict between them resulted from a combination of a lack of understanding of what had been recorded and carelessness in proofreading, which can be explained by Léry's religious fanaticism.

=== In Joseph of Anchieta ===
Anchieta's Play of Saint Lawrence (Note: Martins translates: "We infested Moçupiroca, / Jequeí, Guatapitiba, / Niterói, the Paraíba, / Guajajó, Carijó-oca, / Pacucaia, Araçatiba. // All the Tamoios went / to lie burning in hell. / Only a few, loving God, / live in this village, / permanently sheltered." Navarro translates: "We ate up all of Moçupiroca, / Jequeí, Guatapitiba, / Niterói, Paraíba, / Guajajó, Carioca, / Pacucaia, Araçatiba. // All the Tamoios have already gone, / burning in the fire. / A few, loving God, / live in this village, / being saved." Moçupiroca means "skinned muçum".)

Yaupa Moçupiroca,
Yequej, guatapitiba,
Nheterõya, Paraiba
Guayayo, Carijo oca
Pacucaya, Araçatiba.
Opaumã Tamũya çou
ocaya tatape oupa,
moconho Tupã rauçupa
co taba pupe çecou
oyepiçiromo ocupa.

There is another list of villages in Guanabara Bay, although partial, as it enumerates only those that disappeared following the victory of the Portuguese and their Tupi allies, which caused several Tupinambá to migrate inland and northward. Found in Joseph of Anchieta's Play of Saint Lawrence, in the stanza comprising verses 147 to 151, nine villages are enumerated; among them, verse 150 mentions Carioca in a more accurate spelling which, according to Frederico Edelweiss, "puts an end once and for all to any equivocation", and which, according to Eduardo de Almeida Navarro et al., makes the etymology "clear": Carijo oca.

Maria de Lourdes de Paula Martins connects Carijo oca with Carioca, stating it was a name designating the stretch, in Rio de Janeiro, from Botafogo Beach to Catete, derived from a stream that existed there. She translates it literally as 'the village' or 'the villages of the Carijós'.

== Other interpretations ==
The number of etymologies proposed for Carioca is large. For Frederico Edelweiss, the explanation in Jean de Léry irrefutably disproves "the majority of our etymologists". According to him, interpretations of the etymology as 'forest current house', 'acari house', and 'Carijó house' are morphologically defensible, whereas those as 'invader house' and 'white man house' find no linguistic support, despite the qualifications of those who initially proposed them. He nevertheless emphasizes the true etymology of the word is 'Carijó house'.

=== 'White man house' ===
The interpretation of Carioca as 'white man house' was first proposed by Varnhagen. It was later adopted by numerous followers of his, such as Antenor Nascentes. Antônio Lemos Barbosa criticizes Nascentes, stating that, to clarify his doubts, "a lifetime spent among the Apiacá or the Parintintin, among snakes and lizards, would not explain a single letter" of the word carioca.

Eduardo de Almeida Navarro et al. consider this etymology incorrect. According to Frederico Edelweiss, it is inadmissible, and anyone who interprets the name this way "understands little or nothing" of Tupi. 'White' in Old Tupi is karaíba; only in Língua Geral did the form cariba emerge, from around 1700 onward, eventually becoming kariwa in Nheengatu. Since Carioca is a 16th-century name, 'white man' could only have been karaíba, which, when compounded with oka, would necessarily give rise to caraiboca, (Note: By combining cariba with oca, the word cariboca is obtained, referring to a person of mixed ancestry. The word, in this case, is composed with the verb 'to take out, extract'.) a term "fortuitously" attested in the 16th-century Play of Saint Lawrence, written by Joseph of Anchieta.

== See also ==
- Etymology of Curitiba

== Bibliography ==
- Anchieta, Joseph de (1933). Peixoto, Afranio (ed.). Cartas, Informações, Fragmentos Historicos e Sermões [Letters, Information, Historical Fragments and Sermons]. Cartas Jesuiticas (in Portuguese). Vol. III. Rio de Janeiro: Civilização Brasileira.
- Anchieta, José de (1954). Martins, M. de L. de Paula (ed.). Poesias: manuscrito do séc. XVI, em português, castelhano, latim e tupi [Poems: manuscript of the 16th century, in Portuguese, Castilian, Latin, and Tupi ] (in Portuguese). São Paulo: Museu Paulista.
- Anchieta, José de (2006). Navarro, Eduardo de Almeida (ed.). José de Anchieta: Teatro [Joseph of Anchieta: Theater]. Dramaturgos do Brasil (in Portuguese) (2nd ed.). São Paulo: Martins Fontes. ISBN 85-336-2142-6.
- Avila, Marcel Twardowsky (2021). Proposta de dicionário nheengatu-português [Nheengatu–Portuguese dictionary proposal ] (in Portuguese). São Paulo: Universidade de São Paulo. Archived from the original on 13 September 2026.
- Barbosa, Antônio Lemos (1956). Curso de tupi antigo: gramática, exercícios, textos [Course of Old Tupi: grammar, exercises, texts] (in Portuguese). Rio de Janeiro: Livraria São José. Archived from the original on 28 January 2026.
- Cardim, Fernão (1925). Garcia, Rodolpho (ed.). Tratados da terra e gente do Brasil [Treatises of the land and people of Brazil ] (in Portuguese). Rio de Janeiro: J. Leite & Cia. Archived from the original on 22 August 2026.
- Corrêa-da-Silva, Beatriz Carretta (2013). "O mundo a partir do léxico: reconstruindo a realidade social Mawé-Awetí-Tupí-Guaraní" [The world from the lexicon: reconstructing the Mawé–Awetí–Tupí–Guaraní social reality]. Revista Brasileira de Linguística Antropológica (in Portuguese). 5 (2): 385–400. doi:10.26512/rbla.v5i2.16271. Archived from the original on 13 April 2026.
- Edelweiss, Frederico (1967). "Os topônimos indígenas do Rio de Janeiro quinhentista" [The Indigenous toponyms of 16th-century Rio de Janeiro]. Revista do Instituto Histórico e Geográfico Brasileiro (in Portuguese). 275. Rio de Janeiro: Departamento de Imprensa Nacional: 80–134.
- Leite, Serafim, ed. (1958). Monumenta Brasiliae [Monuments of Brazil ] (in Portuguese). Vol. III. Rome: Monumenta historica Societatis Iesu.
- Lemle, Miriam (1971). "Internal classification of the Tupi–Guarani linguistic family". In Bendor-Samuel, David (ed.). Tupi Studies I. Summer Institute of Linguistics Publications in Linguistics and Related Fields. Vol. 29. Norman: Summer Institute of Linguistics. pp. 107–129. Archived from the original on 6 June 2024.
- Lery, Iean de (1578). Chuppin, Antoine (ed.). Histoire d'un voyage fait en la terre du Bresil, autrement dite Amerique [History of a voyage made in the land of Brazil, otherwise called America] (in Middle French).
- Mello, Antônio Augusto Souza (2000). Estudo histórico da família linguística tupi-guarani: aspectos fonológicos e lexicais [Historical study of the Tupi–Guarani linguistic family: phonological and lexical aspects] (in Portuguese). Florianópolis: Universidade Federal de Santa Catarina. Archived from the original on 21 June 2025.
- Navarro, Eduardo de Almeida (2005). Método moderno de tupi antigo: a língua do Brasil dos primeiros séculos [Modern Method of Old Tupi: the language of Brazil of the first centuries] (in Portuguese) (3rd ed.). São Paulo: Global. ISBN 85-260-1058-1.
- Navarro, Eduardo de Almeida (2013). Dicionário de tupi antigo: a língua indígena clássica do Brasil [Dictionary of Old Tupi: the classical Indigenous language of Brazil ] (in Portuguese) (1st ed.). São Paulo: Global. ISBN 978-85-260-1933-1.
- Navarro, Eduardo de Almeida; Trevisan, Rodrigo Godinho; Fonseca, Renato da Silva (2012). "Recensão crítica do livro "O português e o tupi no Brasil", de Volker Noll e Wolf Dietrich" [Critical review of the book "O português e o tupi no Brasil", by Volker Noll and Wolf Dietrich]. Língua e Literatura (in Portuguese) (30): 359–377. doi:10.11606/issn.2594-5963.lilit.2012.97584. Archived from the original on 19 July 2026.
- Nikulin, Andrey (2020). Proto-Macro-Jê: um estudo reconstrutivo [Proto-Macro-Jê: a reconstructive study] (in Portuguese). Brasília: Universidade de Brasília. Archived from the original on 15 April 2026.
- Noll, Volker (2024). "Os primeiros empréstimos tupis no português do Brasil" [The first Tupi borrowings in the Portuguese of Brazil]. In Noll, Volker; Dietrich, Wolf (eds.). O português e o tupi no Brasil [Portuguese and Tupi in Brazil ] (in Portuguese) (1st ed.). São Paulo: Contexto. ISBN 978-85-7244-472-9.
- Rodrigues, Aryon Dall'Igna; Cabral, Ana Suelly Arruda Câmara (2012). "Tupían". In Campbell, Lyle; Grondona, Verónica (eds.). The Indigenous Languages of South America: A Comprehensive Guide. The World of Linguistics. Vol. 2. De Gruyter Mouton. ISBN 978-3-11-025513-3.
- Schleicher, Charles Owen (1998). Comparative and internal reconstruction of the Tupi–Guarani language family. University of Wisconsin–Madison. Archived from the original on 5 March 2026.
- Um socio do Instituto Historico do Brazil (1854). Historia geral do Brazil [General history of Brazil ] (in Portuguese). Rio de Janeiro: E. e H. Laemmert. Archived from the original on 26 December 2024.
