= Arte de grammatica da lingua brasilica da naçam kiriri =

1699 book by Luís Vincêncio Mamiani

Art of Grammar of the Brasílica Language of the Kiriri Nation
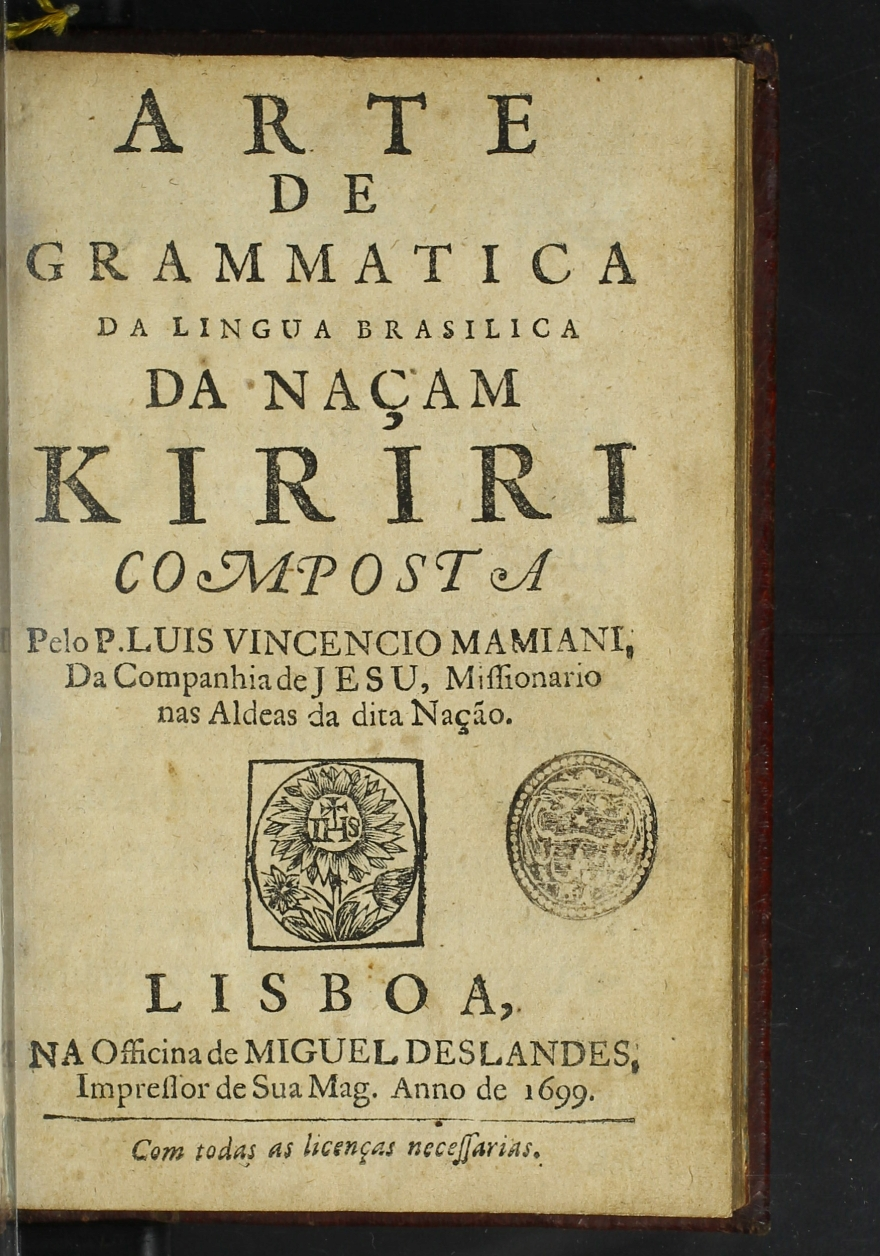
- Title page
- Author: Luís Vincêncio Mamiani
- Original title: Arte de gramática da língua brasílica da nação quiriri
- Language: Portuguese
- Publication date: 1699
- Publication place: Portugal
- Original text: Arte de gramática da língua brasílica da nação quiriri online

Full transcription of the work (unreviewed)

Art of Grammar of the Brasílica Language of the Kiriri Nation (Portuguese: Arte de gramática da língua brasílica da nação quiriri ) (Note: In the original spelling, Arte de grammatica da lingua brasilica da naçam kiriri) is a grammar book by Luís Vincêncio Mamiani, published in 1699 in the city of Lisbon by Miguel Deslandes. It is the only grammatical account of a non-Tupi language published during the Brazilian colonial period, although many other languages were studied and grammars circulated as manuscripts, such as the Maromomim (possibly Macro-Jê) and Aroá languages, all of which have been lost.

== Structure ==
Dedicated to the grammatical study of the Kipeá language, the work is structured in two parts: the first addresses orthography, pronunciation, noun declension, and verb conjugation; the second concerns syntax and the "construction of the eight parts of speech". The copy at the Biblioteca Brasiliana Mindlin includes a handwritten page of errata.

== Analysis ==
Mamiani did not publish a vocabulary of the language, (Note: He did, however, make reference to a supposed vocabulary in a 1696 letter to Tirso González.) but in 1942, Aryon Dall'Igna Rodrigues compiled a dictionary based on this treatise. Rodrigues regards Mamiani's work as one of the finest grammars produced in the 17th century.

The Kariri languages are ergative; although Mamiani's work is essentially grounded in the Greco-Latin grammatical tradition, his description of Kipeá's ergativity is considered quite coherent, elegant, and economical. Mamiani analyzes all transitive verbs as passive in nature. Both these and the intransitive verbs—referred to as neuter—take an unmarked nominative argument (the absolutive), whereas so-called passive verbs take an "ablative of agent" (the ergative argument), marked by an adposition. By treating transitive verbs as passive, the entire system falls into place logically.

== See also ==
- Catechism of the Christian Doctrine in the Brasílica Language of the Kiriri Nation

== Bibliography ==
- Brown, Keith; Ogilvie, Sarah, eds. (2009). Concise Encyclopedia of Languages of the World. Elsevier. ISBN 978-0-08-087774-7. LCCN 2008934269.
- Leite, Serafim (1949). História da Companhia de Jesus no Brasil [History of the Company of Jesus in Brazil] (in Portuguese). Vol. VIII. Rio de Janeiro: Instituto Nacional do Livro.
- Ribeiro, Eduardo Rivail (19 March 2004). "Ergativity avant la lettre". The LINGUIST List.
- Rodrigues, Aryon D. (July 2014). "Classificação nominal em Karirí" [Nominal classification in Karirí]. Revista Brasileira de Linguística Antropológica (in Portuguese). 6 (1). doi:10.26512/rbla.v6i1.21055. Archived from the original on 21 November 2024.
- Zwartjes, Otto (2011). Portuguese Missionary Grammars in Asia, Africa and Brazil, 1550–1800. Studies in the History of the Language Sciences. John Benjamins Publishing Company. doi:10.1075/sihols.117. ISBN 978-90-272-8325-2. LCCN 2011033750.
