= Etymology of Curitiba =

Origin of the name Curitiba

Diagram representing the etymology of Curitiba according to Eduardo de Almeida Navarro

This article deals with the etymology of the name of the city of Curitiba, capital of the Brazilian state of Paraná.

The meaning of Curitiba is well-established among scholars. It signifies "pinhal" or "pinheiral" (lit. 'pine forest' or 'pine grove'), reflecting the landscape that surrounds the city. The primary subject of debate lies in the language of origin of this toponym. Aryon Rodrigues, in an academic article, argues that it ultimately derives from Old Guarani, albeit exhibiting significant influences from the General Language spoken by mestiços originating from São Paulo or Rio de Janeiro. Eduardo de Almeida Navarro, while concurring with Rodrigues regarding the meaning, specifies this language as the Paulista General Language.

== Curitiba ==
The primitive nucleus of the city of Curitiba was called Nossa Senhora da Luz e Bom Jesus dos Pinhais. The region where this nucleus was located was called Campos Gerais or Campos de Curitiba. When a village was established in the area, it became known as Nossa Senhora da Luz e Bom Jesus de Curitiba, that is, Pinhais was replaced by Curitiba.

== Spelling and meaning ==
From 1720 to 1853, it was possible to write the name of Curitiba in various ways, such as Curiytyba, Curiytuba, Curituba, Coretyba, Coreytyba, Corityba, and Curetyba. The forms Corityba and Curityba were in use from 1853 to 1919. That year, the Municipal Chamber of Curitiba, through 25 July Resolution 7, officially defined the spelling as Curityba. On 19 December, Afonso Camargo, then President of the State of Paraná, signed Decree 1126, which mandated the adoption of the name Curityba for all official acts of the state. In 1943, the spelling of the name of the capital of Paraná became Curitiba.

The meaning of the toponym Curitiba is well-established. In this sense, it signifies "pinhal" or "pinheiral" (lit. 'pine forest' or 'pine grove'); all modern scholars concur with this interpretation. (Note: For instance, Teodoro Fernandes Sampaio, Romário Martins, Antenor Nascentes, Aryon Rodrigues, and Rosário Farâni Mansur Guérios. Manuel Aires de Casal, Augustin Saint-Hilaire, and Carl Friedrich Philipp von Martius, whose works were published as early as the 19th century, already concurred with this significance.) Indeed, the region surrounding the city of Curitiba is covered with Brazilian pine trees (Araucaria angustifolia), which is also reflected in the toponymy of immediate or neighboring areas, such as Pinhais, São José dos Pinhais, and Pinhalão. Certainly of Tupi–Guarani origin, there are, however, divergences regarding the specific language of origin of this toponym.

== Records and morphological analysis ==
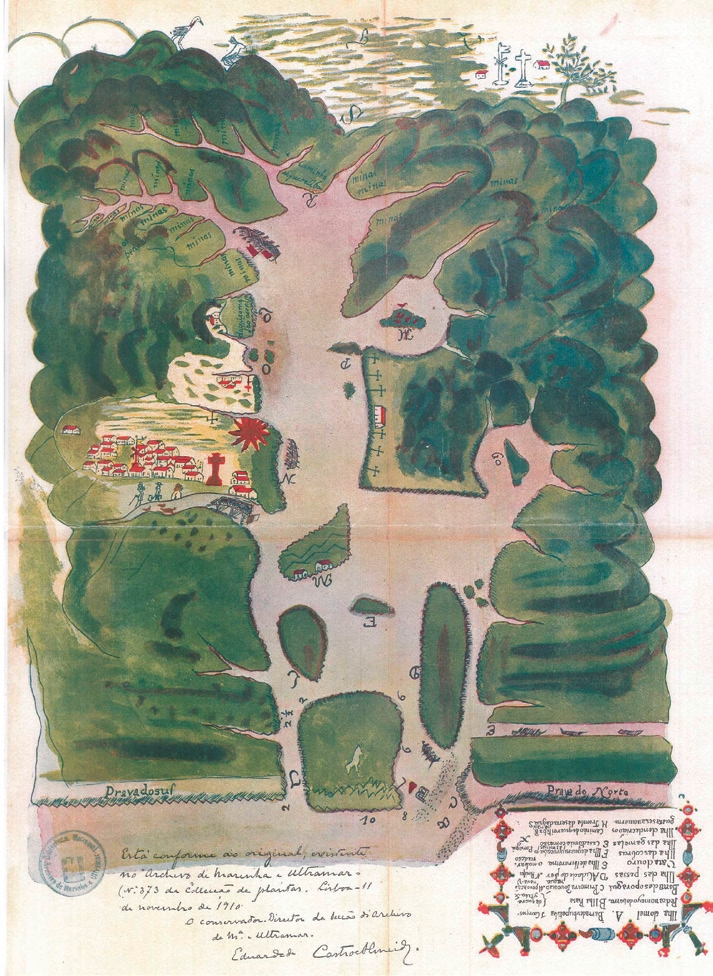
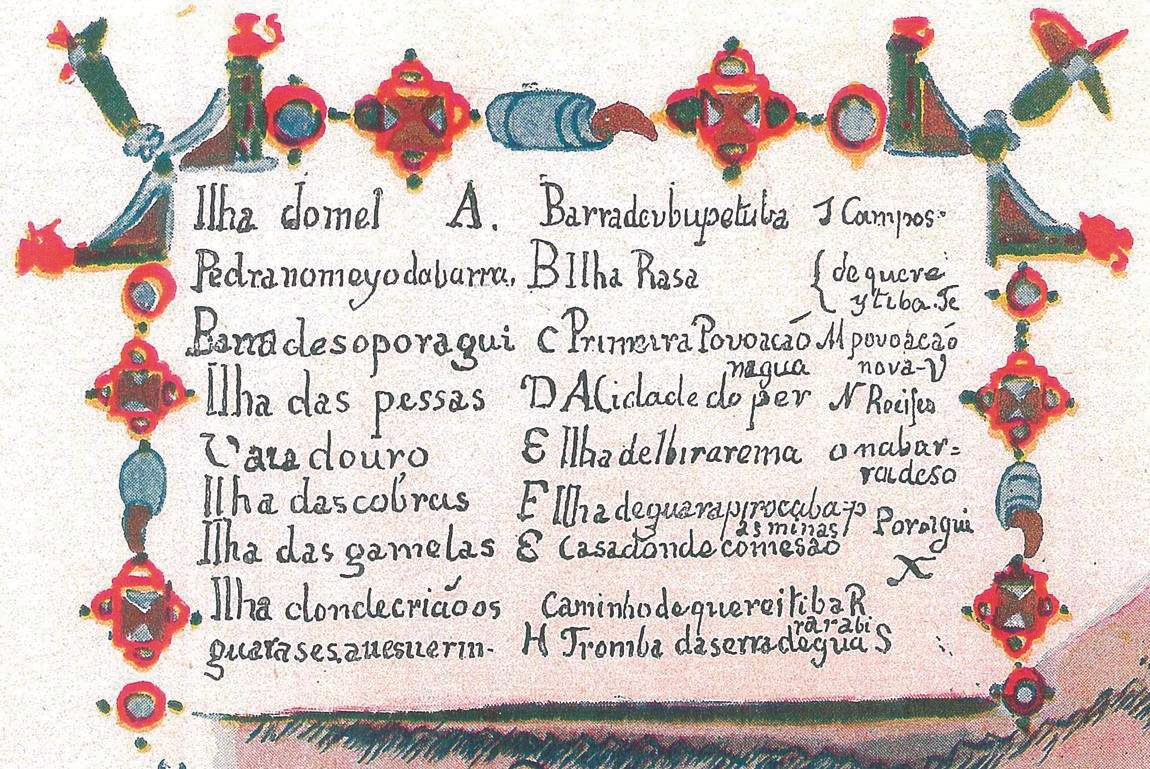
1653 map where Quereitiba is read, indicating originally Curitiba should be spelled with two i's

A significant portion of the territory of the Brazilian state of Paraná was inhabited by indigenous people who spoke the Old Guarani language. The Peruvian priest Antonio Ruiz de Montoya documented in his works the word "curiĭ" (pine tree), providing the compound name "curiĭbaỹî", among others. Therefore, the basic form of the name for the Brazilian pine tree (Araucaria angustifolia) was kuri'yb—in Old Guarani, the final consonant was often dropped, except in cases where it was followed by another consonant within the same word. The second part of the word Curitiba derives from a root common to the languages of the Tupi–Guarani family. Bringing forth an idea of existence, in composition it designates a place where something abounds. Montoya, exemplifying its use in Old Guarani, where the form of this root was tyb, provides the terms "abatitĭ" (lit. 'cornfield') and "caatĭ" (lit. 'herb field'). One can thus construct kuri'ytyb, to which the suffix -a is added in specific situations, as documented by Montoya in "capyítĭba" (lit. 'grassland') and "ytatĭba" (lit. 'rocky terrain').

It is often asserted the name Curitiba is formed by kuri and tyba. Although one can analyze kuri'yb as a composition between kuri (pine or pine nut) and 'yb (tree), Montoya does not record kuri without 'yb—the pine nut with shell itself is called kuri'yb, not kuri. In Old Guarani, the composition should have been kuri'ytyba. The apostrophe here represents the glottal stop, and the letter y represents the close central unrounded vowel. When appropriated by Portuguese speakers, indigenous words lost the glottal stop, and the y was sometimes replaced by i, sometimes by u. Aryon Rodrigues suggests, then, kuri'ytyba would have become kuriitiba and, with the contraction of the two i's, kuritiba. In one of the oldest records of the name Curitiba, from 1653, it is read as Quereitiba, indicating the sequence of two i's. There is also a possible record of Curijtiba in the 1698 land grant letter of Botiatuva. (Note: Differently from Aryon Rodrigues, however, Eduardo de Almeida Navarro suggests Curitiba derives from the hypothetical element kuri and tyba.)

== Language of origin ==
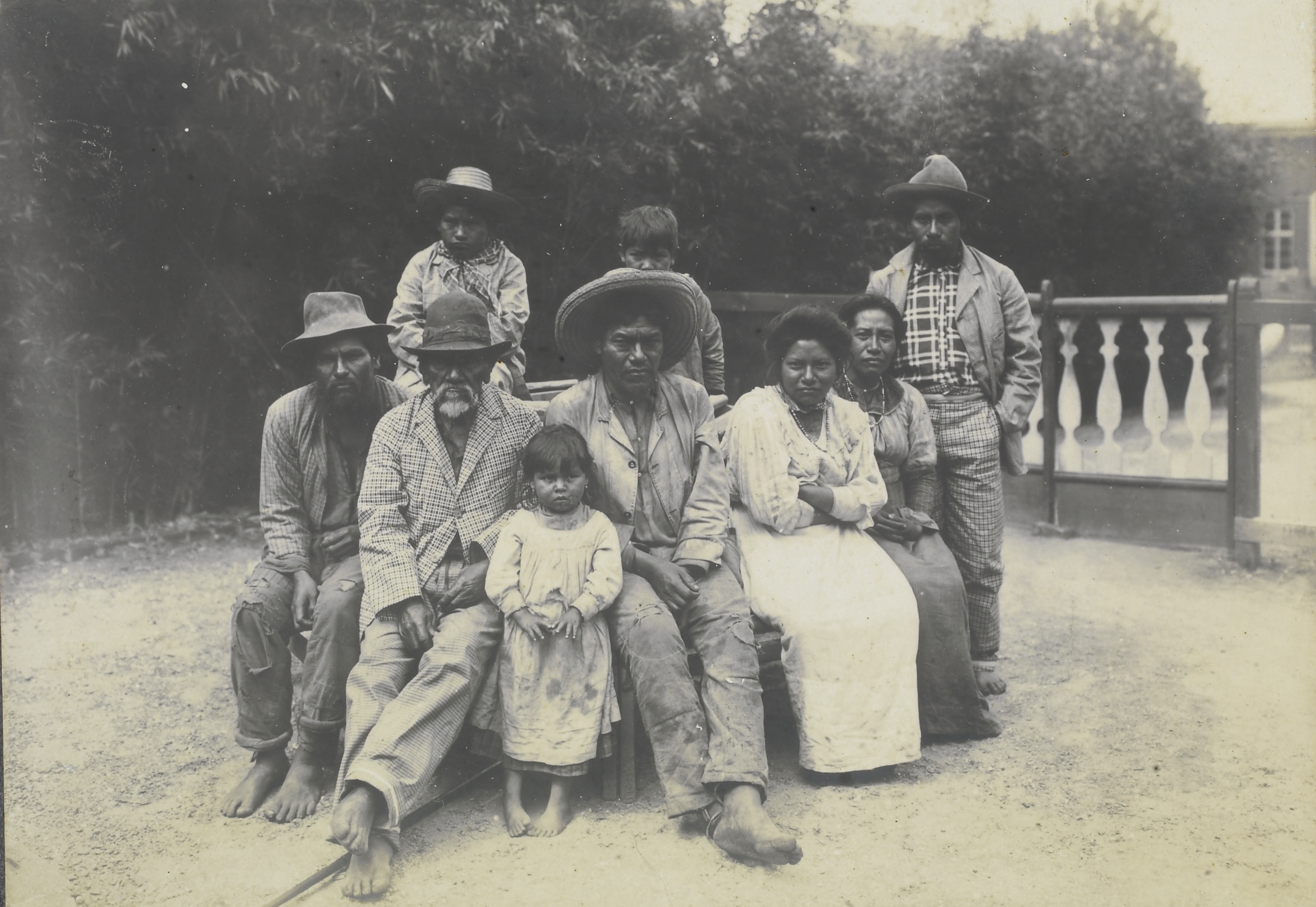
Although certainly of Tupi–Guarani origin, there is a claim of origin by a non-Tupi–Guarani language, the Kaingang.

Augustin Saint-Hilaire attributed the name Curitiba to the Guarani language. Carl Friedrich Philipp von Martius attributed it to the Tupi language, but he gave this term a broad sense, (Note: The term Tupi acquired a broad sense in the 19th century. Originally, it referred to the 16th-century Tupi–Guarani Indians established on the coast of Santos and São Vicente, as well as along the upper Tietê River.) so his hypothesis does not contradict that of Saint-Hilaire.

In Paraná, the toponym Curitiba is the only one ending in tiba; the others end in tuba or tuva (such as Guaratuba, for instance). There, the letter y before b was adapted, in Portuguese, as u. Along the coast, the area where tuba and tuva predominate extends from the bay of Angra dos Reis to Laguna; inland, it spans from the upper Paraíba do Sul River and the upper and middle Tietê River to the Uruguay River. Regarding the tiba element, it predominates in the area from the upper Tietê River to the upper Grande River in Minas Gerais; and from the coast of Angra dos Reis to the Jequitinhonha River in Bahia.

Anyway, it should be noted the forms Curituba, Curituva, Curutuba, and Currutuva have been documented. This indicates that, in the 17th century, the expected pronunciations Curituba and Curituva also existed; Curitiba specifically has been attested since at least 1649, as seen in testimony regarding the discovery of gold in the fields of Curitiba. Aryon Rodrigues argues the pronunciation Curitiba derives from the early explorers of the Curitiba fields. Most of them likely spoke a General Language, alongside Portuguese, and probably adapted words from one language to the other. Indeed, Eleodoro Ébano Pereira, involved in gold mining in Curitiba, was a native of Rio de Janeiro (where tiba prevails, instead of tuba and tuva), and, in the testimonies taken at his initiative, the form Curitiba consistently appears 14 times. Therefore, the pronunciation Curitiba reveals accents of individuals hailing from distant regions, such as São Paulo or Rio de Janeiro. The toponym in question, according to Rodrigues, should be a name derived from a General Language. Eduardo de Almeida Navarro agrees, specifying the Paulista General Language as the language of origin of the toponym.

=== Kaingang hypothesis ===
Romário Martins reported the indigenous leader Arakxó, chief of the Kaingang people, attributed the name Curitiba to the phrase "curi-tim", which literally means "hurry, let's go!". According to Arakxó, the Kaingang people, upon abandoning their land in favor of the Portuguese, would have uttered the phrase, imperfectly reproduced by Portuguese speakers and transformed into Curitiba. In 1950, the Kaingang woman Maria Francisca das Dores provided Aryon Rodrigues with another hypothesis. Attempts to explain Tupi–Guarani toponyms in Kaingang are not limited to Curitiba; Maria Francisca das Dores attempted to explain, through her language, the toponym Itapetininga, which actually originates from the Paulista General Language.

== See also ==
- Etymology of carioca

== Bibliography ==
- Ferreira, Jurandyr Pires (1959). Enciclopédia dos municípios brasileiros [Encyclopedia of Brazilian municipalities] (PDF) (in Portuguese). Vol. 31. Rio de Janeiro: Instituto Brasileiro de Geografia e Estatística. Archived (PDF) from the original on 5 February 2024.
- Montoya, Antonio Ruiz de (1639). Sánchez, Juan (ed.). Tesoro de la lengua guaraní [Thesaurus of the Guarani language] (in Spanish). Madrid: Company of Jesus.
- Navarro, Eduardo de Almeida (2013). Dicionário de tupi antigo: a língua indígena clássica do Brasil [Dictionary of Old Tupi: the classical indigenous language of Brazil] (in Portuguese) (1st ed.). São Paulo: Global. ISBN 978-85-260-1933-1.
- Rodrigues, Aryon Dall'Igna (June 1995). "O nome Curitiba" [The name Curitiba] (PDF). Boletim Informativo da Casa Romário Martins (in Portuguese). 21 (105). Archived (PDF) from the original on 5 February 2024.
