= Dzubukuá language =

Extinct Karirian language of Brazil

Dzubukuá
- Kariri, Kariri-Xocó
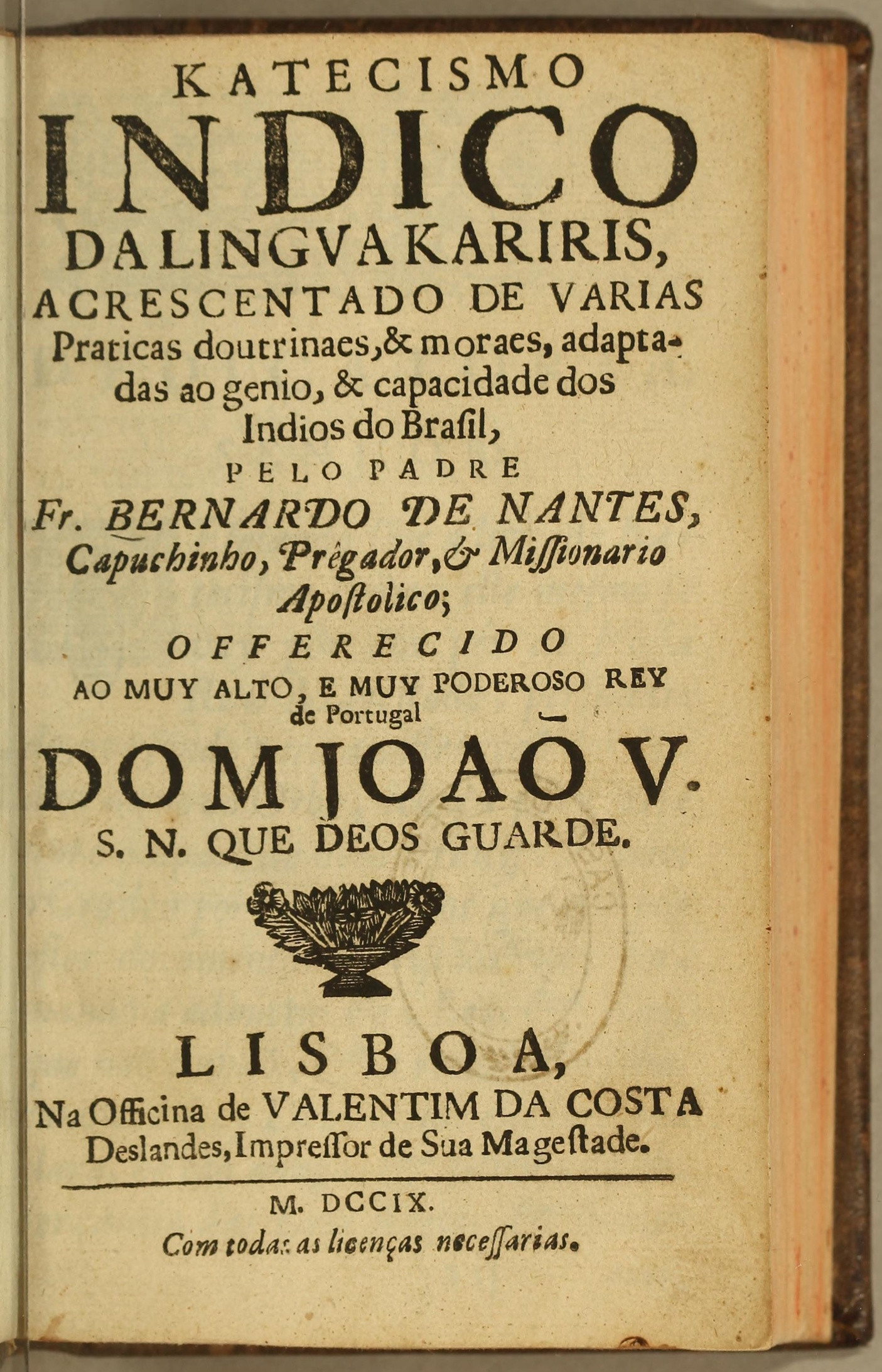
- 1709 catechism in Dzubukuá
- Native to: Brazil
- Region: Cabrobó, Pernambuco
- Ethnicity: Kariri-Xokó, Tingui-Botó, Abacatiara
- Era: attested 1702 and 1709
- Revival: 1989
- Language family: Karirian: Dzubukuá

Official status
- Official language in: Brazil (Crateús)

Language codes
- ISO 639-3: kzw – inclusive code Individual code: tgv – Tingui-Botó
- Glottolog: dzub1241 Dzubukuá kari1255 Karirí-Xocó ting1238 Tingui-Boto (retired)
- Linguasphere: 89-CBA-ac
- Map of Cabrobó, Pernambuco, where Dzubukuá was originally spoken

Dzubukuá (or Kariri), referred to by the community as Kariri-Xocó, is an extinct Karirian language, sometimes considered a dialect of a singular Kariri language, of Brazil. Since 1989, there is a process of linguistic revitalization underway. In 2025, it was declared official in the city of Crateús in the state of Ceará.

== History ==
=== Documentation ===
There are only two known primary sources containing the Dzubukuá language. One is a manuscript dated 1702, (Note: Available from Commons here) and the other is a 1709 catechism, both by the French Capuchin missionary Bernardo de Nantes.

There is no report of the possible survival of Dzubukuá grammar and dictionary manuscripts.

=== Revival ===
Beginning in 1989, the Kariri-Xocó people of Porto Real do Colégio, Alagoas, have been reviving their language through teaching it in biweekly lessons and disseminating materials through social media. The Tingui-Botó people claim to use Dzubukuá, their ancestral language, in their secret Ouricuri ritual.

=== Official status ===
On 28 August 2025, Dzubukuá was declared official in Crateús, Ceará, the second municipality in the state after Monsenhor Tabosa to declare an Indigenous language official.

== Classification ==
Dzubukuá has typically been considered as a dialect of a singular Kariri language. In the preface of the catechism, however, Nantes attests to the distinction between the way the Dzubukuá and Kipeá spoke ("one language is as different from the other as Portuguese is from Castilian"). Traditionally, Dzubukuá and the other Kariri languages or dialects were classified as members of the Macro-Jê languages. This classification was first proposed by Brazilian linguist Aryon Rodrigues in 1986. More recently, however, the genetic affinity of Kariri within Macro-Jê has been questioned, and Andrey Nikulin excludes it from the family in his assessment. He instead proposes a relationship with the Bororoan and Cariban languages, which he further suspects may be related to Macro-Jê on a deeper timescale.

== Geographical distribution ==
It was spoken on the São Francisco River islands, in the Cabrobó area of Pernambuco.

== Phonology ==
=== Consonants ===
Consonantal phonemes
| | | Labial | Alveolar | Palatal | Velar | Glottal |
|---|---|---|---|---|---|---|
| Occlusive | voiceless | p | t | | k | |
| Occlusive | voiced | b | d | | ɡ | |
| Nasal | | m | n | ɲ | | |
| Flap | | | ɾ | | | |
| Fricative | | | | | | h |
| Affricate | voiceless | | ts | | | |
| Affricate | voiced | | dz | | | |
| Lateral | | | l | | | |

Nikulin differs from Queiroz regarding the interpretation of the digraphs ⟨oe⟩ and ⟨dh⟩, which he says represent /ə/ and /ð/, respectively. Accordingly, he records "fire" as "isu" in Kipeá, but as "iðu" in Dzubukuá.

In 2012, Queiroz revised his 2008 description and changed his position regarding the existence of glides in Dzubukuá. Thus, ⟨j⟩ and ⟨y⟩, which he had considered indicators of /j/, and ⟨w⟩ and ⟨v⟩, which he had considered indicators of /w/, came to be reinterpreted as the high vowels /i/ and /u/.

=== Vowels ===
Vocalic phonemes
| | | Front | Central | Back |
|---|---|---|---|---|
| High | | i | ɨ | u |
| Mid | unrounded | e | | |
| Mid | rounded | œ ⟨oe⟩ | | o |
| Low | | | a | |

- /a/ has the allophones [a], [ɐ̰], and [ã].
- /e/ has the allophones [e], [ḛ], [eː], and [ẽ].
- /œ/ has the allophones [œ], [æ], [œ̰].
- /i/ has the allophones [i] and [ḭ].
- /u/ has the allophones [u], [ṵ], and [uː].
- /o/ has the allophones [o], [o̰], [oː], and [o̰ː].

== Sample text ==
Below is the Lord's Prayer in Dzubukuá, according to Bernardo de Nantes in his 1709 catechism:

Kupadzua nhinho dibbali mo arãquè, donetsoa onadce, dohanaclèa andzenne, duca adôo dseho wohôye donanhe hidommodè bo imwj Iaccedde do anunhiu; do Innea búye do amuiquede mo radda, mono Innea bûye do amuiquede mo hémwj. doddi enna hyammittedè moenaham, docabbi enna hidôodè mo hibuangatedè anhiëj, mono wo hicabbidè do dibuangali hiëiddè dopecrodce Iadcedde ho Ihencoddhete nienwo, donunhie Iadcedde bo Ibulète bammodi Bopadzu nhinho.
