= Ara poru aguĭyey haba =

1759–1760 book by José de Insaurralde

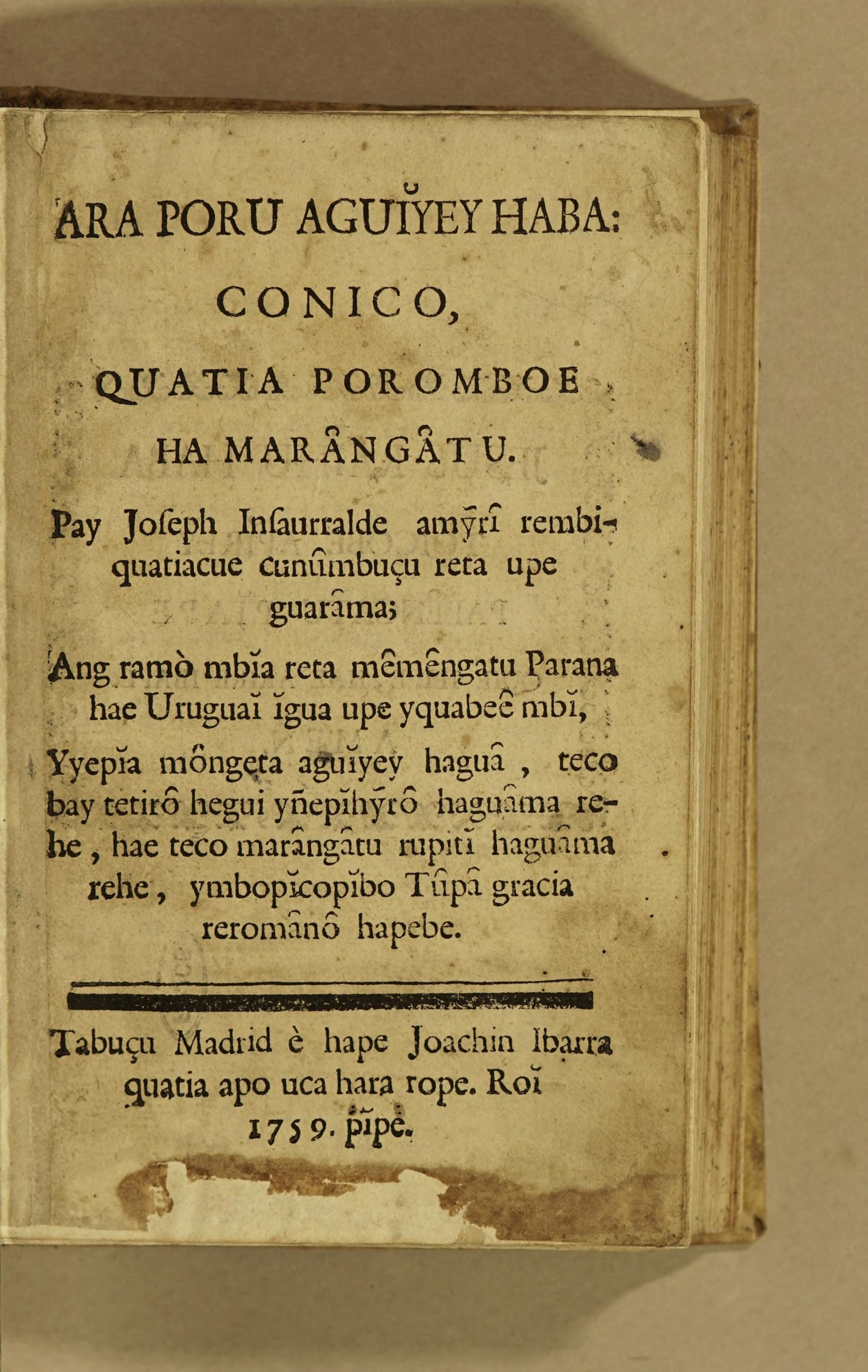
- Title page of the first volume
- Author: José de Insaurralde
- Language: Classical Guarani
- Publisher: Joaquín Ibarra
- Publication date: 1759 (1st volume); 1760 (2nd volume)
- Publication place: Madrid

Ara poru aguĭyey haba (lit. 'good use of time') is a Classical Guarani book by Paraguayan priest José de Insaurralde. Published posthumously in two volumes in Madrid in 1759 and 1760 – 30 years after the author's death – it differs from other works in that language in that its more than 800 pages are not merely a translation. It consists of spiritual reflections arranged in weekly series, with two meditations for each day. Antônio Lemos Barbosa states it is likely Insaurralde followed a similar European work in the development of his book.

== See also ==
- Tesoro de la lengua guaraní
