= Play of Saint Lawrence =

Play by Joseph of Anchieta in Portuguese, Spanish, and Tupi

- Written by: Joseph of Anchieta
- Series: In the Village of Guaraparim

Premiere
- Date premiered: 10 August 1587

Play of Saint Lawrence (Portuguese: Auto de São Lourenço) is one of the most well-known plays by Joseph of Anchieta. It is written in Portuguese, Spanish, Old Tupi, and Old Guarani, reflecting the social reality of the time. It records ethnographic information, such as the tearful salutation, as well as toponyms and sparsely documented episodes, such as the Battle of the Canoes. Play of Saint Lawrence was first performed in Saint Lawrence Chapel, in what would later become the city of Niterói. According to Armando Cardoso, this would have occurred on 10 August 1587, during Anchieta's visit as provincial. The work was adapted by Guilherme de Almeida.

== Bibliography ==
- Anchieta, José de (1954). Poesias (in Portuguese). Translated by Martins, Maria de Lourdes de Paula. São Paulo: Museu Paulista.
- Anchieta, José de (2006). Teatro (in Portuguese). Translated by Navarro, Eduardo de Almeida (2nd ed.). São Paulo: Martins Fontes. ISBN 978-85-336-2142-8.
