= Hans Conon von der Gabelentz =

German politician (1807–1874)

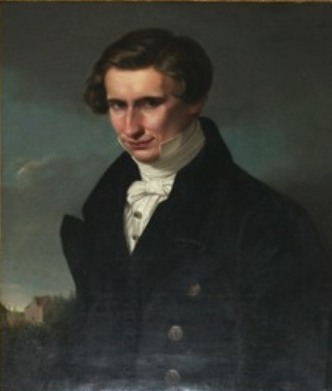

Hans Conon von der Gabelentz (13 October 1807 – 3 September 1874) was a German politician who served as prime minister of the Duchy of Saxe-Altenburg from 1848 to 1849. He was also a gifted linguist and an authority on the Manchu language. He devised a standard romanized transliteration system for Manchu whose creation is often incorrectly credited to his compatriot Paul Georg von Möllendorff.

== Life ==
Born at Altenburg, von der Gabelentz studied finance, law and oriental languages at Leipzig University and the University of Göttingen. He entered the civil service in Saxe-Altenburg in 1830 and was promoted to parliamentary and government councillor in 1831. As the Landmarschall (Country Marshal) in the Grand Duchy of Weimar since 1847, he was present at the preliminary parliament for Frankfurt and then became one of the 17 intermediary agents for the Saxon Duchies.

Later, he was interim parliamentary envoy until the dissolution of the parliament in July 1848. At the end of November, 1848, he was named Prime Minister of the Duchy of Altenburg and resigned in August 1849. In 1850, he went to the parliament in Erfurt as a member of the Staatenhaus. In 1851, the Landschaft of Saxe-Altenburg elected him President. Gabelentz died on 3 September 1874 at his family home at Lemnitz, near Triptis. His son Georg von der Gabelentz also became a famous sinologist.

== Work ==
The fruits of his many years of study are his Elémens [sic] de la grammaire mandchoue (Altenburg 1833). In the Zeitschrift für die Kunde des Morgenlandes (Journal for Oriental Studies, ZMK), which he co-founded. He provided essays about Mongolian and then with Julius Loebe published a new critical edition of Ulfilas' Gothic translation of the Bible, together with grammar, a Greek-Gothic dictionary and a Latin translation (Leipzig 1843, two volumes). He later devoted himself to the Finno-Ugric language family. He published a Mordvin grammar in Vol. 2 of his Journal, Vergleichung der beiden tscheremissischen Dialekte (Comparison of the Two Mari Dialects) in Vol. 4, and Grundzüge der syrjänischen Grammatik (Essentials of Permic Grammar) soon afterwards (Altenburg 1841).

His work covered nearly new linguistic territory for Germany, with his Kurze Grammatik der tscherokesischen Sprache (Short Grammar of the Cherokee Language) in Höfer's Zeitschrift für die Wissenschaft der Sprache (Journal for the Science of Language) (Vol. 3), Beiträge zur Sprachenkunde (Articles on Linguistics), the first three issues of which (Leipzig 1852) contained grammars of the Dayak, Dakota and Kiriri languages, as well as his Grammatik mit Wörterbuch der Kassiasprache (Grammar with Dictionary of the Khasi Language) (Leipzig 1857).

Furthermore, the Abhandlungen (Transactions) of the Gesellschaft der Wissenschaften (Society of Sciences) in Leipzig (1860) contained: Die melanesischen Sprachen nach ihrem grammatischen Bau etc. (The Melanesian Languages According to their Grammatical Structure, etc.), followed by the second part in 1873, and Über das Passivum (About Passive Voice) (Leipzig 1860). Finally, he published the Manchu translation of the Chinese work: Sse-schu, Schu-king, Schi-king, with a Manchu-German lexicon (Leipzig 1864). The Mitteilungen (Communications) of the Geschichts- und Altertumsforschenden Gesellschaft des Osterlandes (Society for Historical and Archeological Research of the Eastern Lands) contained many valuable articles by him on knowledge of the history of his closer homeland. After his death, Geschichte des großen Liao, aus dem Mandschu übersetzt (History of the Great Liao, Translated from Manchu) (St. Petersburg 1877) appeared. The number of languages which Gabelentz more-or-less thoroughly researched—and which he was the first to have scientifically worked on—numbers over 80. He was a full member of the Academy of Sciences in Leipzig.

== Selected literature ==
- Hartmut Walravens und Martin Gimm (eds.): Deutsch-mandjurisches Wörterverzeichnis (nach H. C. von der Gabelentz' Mandschu-Deutschem Wörterbuch). Wiesbaden: Steiner, 1978. ISBN 3-515-02641-X in German
- Klaus Jena: Der Sprachforscher Hans Conon von der Gabelentz (1807 – 1874). Eine Reflexion von Olaf Wegewitz anläßlich der Ausstellung im Lindenau-Museum Altenburg "Der Sprachforscher Hans Conon von der Gabelentz (1807 – 1874)". Altenburg: Lindenau-Museum 1998. ISBN 3-86104-033-6 in German
- Martin Gimm: Hans Conon von der Gabelentz und die Übersetzung des chinesischen Romans Jin Ping Mei. Wiesbaden: Harrassowitz, 2005. ISBN 3-447-05235-X in German
