= Catecismo da doutrina christãa na lingua brasilica da nação kiriri =

1698 book by Luís Vincêncio Mamiani

Catechism of the Christian Doctrine in the Brasílica Language of the Kiriri Nation
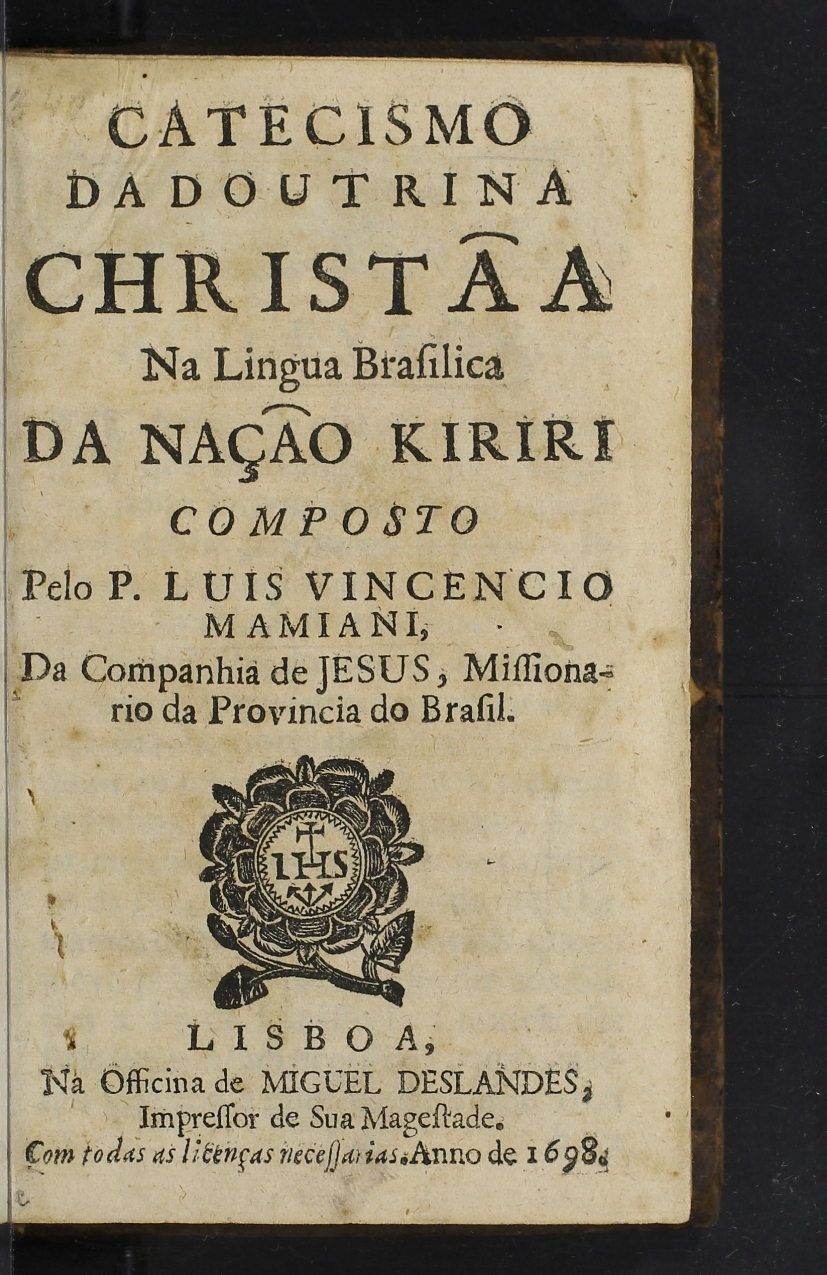
- Title page
- Author: Luís Vincêncio Mamiani
- Original title: Catecismo da doutrina cristã na língua brasílica da nação quiriri
- Language: Kipeá
- Publication date: 1698
- Publication place: Portugal
- Original text: Catecismo da doutrina cristã na língua brasílica da nação quiriri online

Full transcription of the work (unreviewed)

Catechism of the Christian Doctrine in the Brasílica Language of the Kiriri Nation (Portuguese: Catecismo da doutrina cristã na língua brasílica da nação quiriri) (Note: In the original spelling, Catecismo da doutrina christãa na lingua braſilica da nação kiriri) is a book by Luís Vincêncio Mamiani, published in 1698 in the city of Lisbon by Miguel Deslandes. It is written in the Kipeá language.

== History ==
The work is the result of Mamiani's study and systematization of his experiences as a missionary to the Indigenous group in question, in the village of Jeru. On 26 June 1695, he sent a handwritten copy of this work to Tirso González.

=== Facsimile reprint ===
The work was a rarity by the 19th century. As early as 1877, there was already interest in reprinting the catechism, as promised by the then-director of the National Library of Brazil, Benjamin Franklin Ramiz Galvão. However, only one copy was known to exist, held by Francisco Antônio Martins, who did not grant permission for its reproduction. Fruitless searches were carried out abroad, until in 1937 Luís Camilo de Oliveira Neto located a copy at the Vittorio Emanuele National Library (Fondo Gesuitico) in Rome. This discovery enabled the facsimile reprint undertaken by the Imprensa Nacional do Rio de Janeiro in 1942, following permission for photographic reproduction and authorization from the then Minister of Education, Gustavo Capanema.

== Structure ==
It is divided into three sections: the first presents the rudiments of faith and prayer; the second introduces the mysteries, commandments, and sacraments; and the third consists of recommendations for evangelizers, such as the preparation of Indigenous people to receive the sacraments or to make confession.

== See also ==
- Art of Grammar of the Brasílica Language of the Kiriri Nation

== Bibliography ==
- Almeida, Maria Cleidiana Oliveira de (2019). Catecismo Kiriri: história e memória do projeto catequético jesuítico na Aldeia do Geru [Kiriri Catechism: history and memory of Jesuit catechetical project in the Village of Geru] (PDF) (in Portuguese). Vitória da Conquista: Universidade Estadual do Sudoeste da Bahia. Archived (PDF) from the original on 7 August 2024.
- Santos, Ane Luíse Silva Mecenas (2023). "O mundo do papel: a experiência jesuítica e a elaboração da Arte da Língua Kiriri" [The world of paper: the Jesuit experience and the development of the Art of the Kiriri Language]. Locus: Revista de História (in Portuguese). 24 (2). doi:10.34019/2594-8296.2018.v24.20886. Archived from the original on 6 December 2024.
