= In the Village of Guaraparim =

Longest play by Joseph of Anchieta exclusively in Tupi

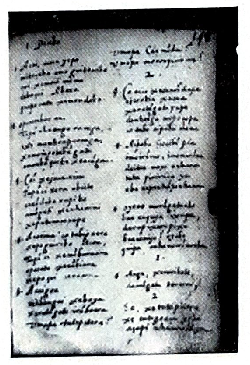
- First folio of the manuscript
- Written by: Joseph of Anchieta
- Characters: Anhanguçu; Tatapitera; Caumondá; Morupiaruera; Soul; Angel
- Original language: Tupi
- Series: Play of Saint Lawrence

Premiere
- Date premiered: Possibly 1585
- Place premiered: Guaraparim village, Espírito Santo

In the Village of Guaraparim (Portuguese: Na Aldeia de Guaraparim) is the title given to the longest play by Joseph of Anchieta, canonized in 2014, written exclusively in the Tupi language, a now dead language. (Note: The title was given by the translator Maria de Lourdes de Paula Martins.)

First performed in the Brazilian state of Espírito Santo, perhaps in the year 1585, it portrays a group of devils plotting to take over a village. When the soul of an Indian named Pirataraca enters the scene, the devils try to tempt him. However, Pirataraca defends himself, calling upon the forgiveness of God. A guardian angel intervenes, protecting the village and expelling the devils.

The purpose of the play was to evangelize the indigenous people and colonists in a playful manner, and furthermore attacks on the cultural elements of the Brazilian indigenous people can be observed. The play has ethnographic and linguistic significance.

== Description ==
The play was first performed in the Guaraparim village, in the Brazilian state of Espírito Santo, perhaps in the year 1585. Maria de Lourdes de Paula Martins suggests December 1589–1594 as the date. In the play, a group of devils conspire to seize control of the Guaraparim village. Each one recounts their misdeeds and wickedness. In the meantime, the soul of a recently deceased Indian named "Pirataraca" descends among them. The devils attempt to lead Pirataraca down their path. The soul of Pirataraca contests the accusations made by the devils about his past life and invokes the Mother of God. Ultimately, a guardian angel, defending the village, saves the Indian and expels the demons.

The play consists of two informally divided acts. The first act takes place in the churchyard, where the devils make their appearance and deliver speeches. (Note: Their names are "Anhanguçu", "Tatapitera" (literally "fire-sucker"), "Caumondá" (literally "cauim thief"), and "Morupiaruera" (literally "ancient adversary of the people").) One devil bemoans the new teachings introduced by the priests to the village, which threatened their wicked ways. He calls his companions, and they conspire on what to do to destroy the village. In the play, there is a strong attack on the cultural elements of the Brazilian indigenous people, such as anthropophagy, the use of cauim and tobacco, and polygamy.

In the second act, following the descent of the soul of Pirataraca, the devils try to persuade it by claiming it is condemned and exposing its sins. The Indian defends himself, invoking his baptism and confirmation names. (Note: Those names are "Francisco Pereira Coutinho", the first donatary of Bahia, and "Vasco Fernandes Coutinho", donatary of Espírito Santo.) He asserts that he has received the forgiveness of God through repentance and confession. As the devils remain obstinate, the soul of Pirataraca cries out for Our Lady and the guardian angel. The guardian angel comes to his aid and drives the devils away. Finally, the guardian angel delivers a sermon to the indigenous people. The second act resembles the work Auto da Alma, by Gil Vicente, in which demons wanted to take the soul of a fool to the boat of hell. Indeed, the theatrical work of Anchieta is strongly influenced by Gil Vicente.

Written exclusively in the Tupi language, the play introduces an original character for indigenous theater, the soul, and hints at a celestial setting, indications of advanced progress in catechesis. It also offers ethnographic data, such as the behavior of couples, the adoption of multiple names, and references to geographical locations, including villages not known in the documentation of the time. Linguistically, it reveals flexibility in language, fast-paced dialogue, and a vocabulary that is relatively richer than that of previous Tupi plays.

== Excerpt ==
The following is an excerpt from this play by Anchieta. Brazilian playwright and author Ariano Suassuna, while comparing the Tupi language to Greek, has stated that in this passage the demon Tatapitera "speaks in a way that resembles the characters of Aristophanes."

Tupi language (Note: In the original spelling, "Aipobu Goaibĩ pia / imoirõmo, imomarãna / deitee moxi onhana / tata piririca ya / aba repenhã penhana / Oyoao marãgatuabo".)	Portuguese language by Eduardo de Almeida Navarro (Note: According to Maria de Lourdes de Paula Martins, "Perturbo os corações das velhas, / irritando-as, fazendo-as brigarem. / Por isso, as malvadas se engalfinham, / o fogo crepitante as toma / e acomete os índios. / Insultam umas às outras.")	English language
Aîpobu gûaîbĩ py'a,	Transtorno o coração das velhas,	I trouble the hearts of the old women,
i moŷrõmo, i momarana.	irritando-as, fazendo-as brigar.	irritating them, making them quarrel.
Nd'e'i te'e moxy onhana,	Por isso mesmo as malditas correm,	That is why the cursed ones run,
tatá piririka îá	como faíscas de fogo,	like sparks of fire,
abá repenhãpenhana,	para ficar atacando as pessoas,	to keep attacking people,
oîoa'omarangatûabo.	insultando-se muito umas às outras.	insulting each other greatly.

== Bibliography ==
- Anchieta, José de (1954). Poesias (in Portuguese). Translated by Martins, Maria de Lourdes de Paula. São Paulo: Museu Paulista.
- Anchieta, José de (2006). Teatro (in Portuguese). Translated by Navarro, Eduardo de Almeida (2nd ed.). São Paulo: Martins Fontes. ISBN 978-85-336-2142-8.
- Lima, Samuel Anderson de Oliveira; Silva, Aline Layane Souto da (2021). "Barroco e antropofagia: um estudo da peça "Na aldeia de Guaraparim" de José de Anchieta". Entrelaces (in Portuguese). 11 (23). Archived from the original on 21 October 2023.
- Navarro, Eduardo de Almeida (2001). "The Translation of the First Texts to Tupi, the Classical Indian Language in Brazil" (PDF). Crop (6). Archived (PDF) from the original on 27 August 2023.
- Navarro, Eduardo de Almeida (2013). Dicionário de tupi antigo: a língua indígena clássica do Brasil (in Portuguese) (1st ed.). São Paulo: Global. ISBN 978-85-260-1933-1.
