= Bernardo de Nantes =

French Capuchin missionary

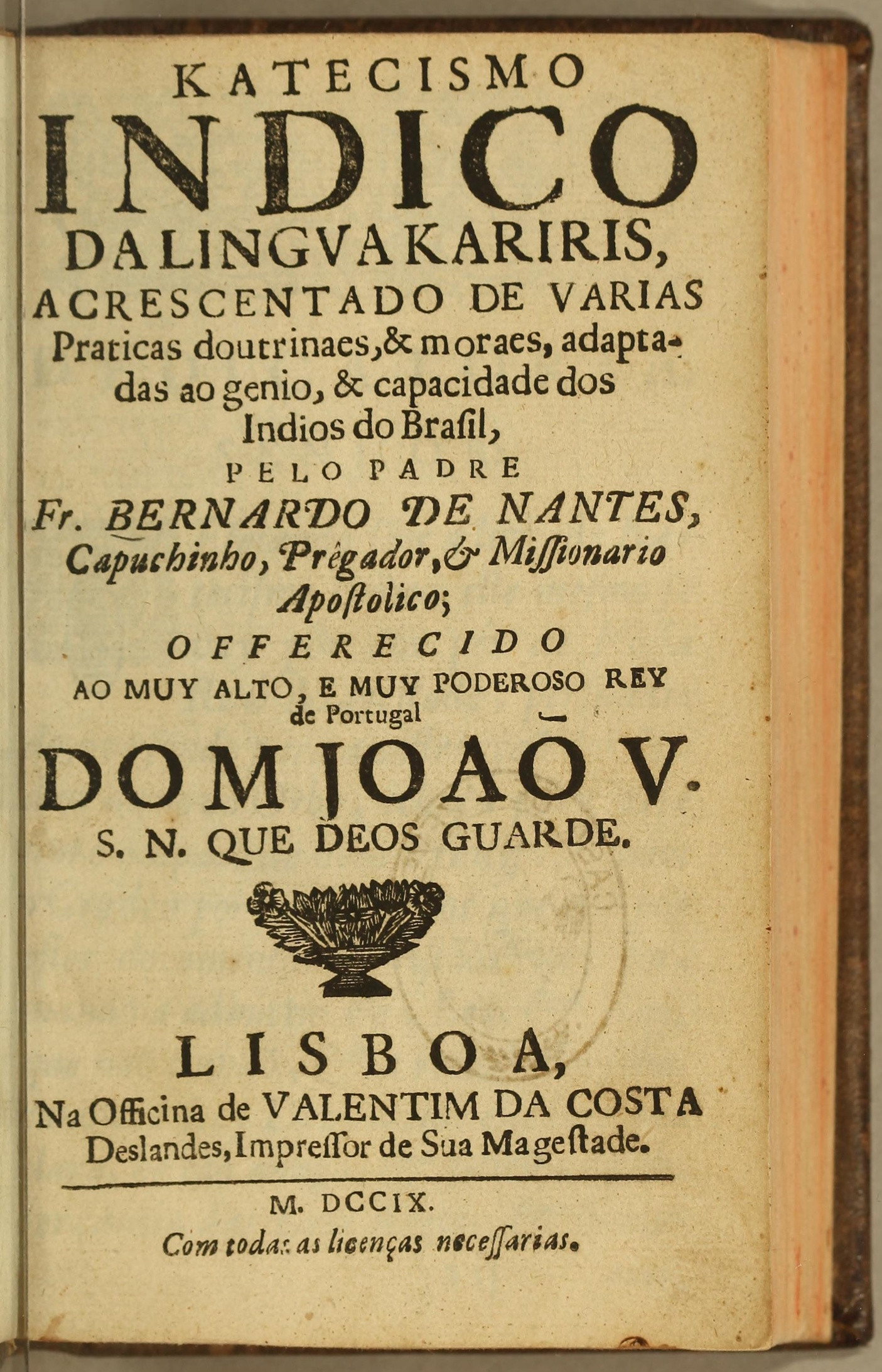
Title page of Catecismo da língua kariris by Bernardo de Nantes

Bernardo de Nantes (fl. late 17th century) was a Capuchin Catholic missionary and linguist active in colonial Brazil, known for his work on the Kiriri language. He is the author of the Catecismo da língua kariris, one of the earliest printed works documenting the language of the Kariri people of northeastern Brazil. The Kariri community lived along the São Francisco River in what is now Bahia and Alagoas.

The Catecismo da língua kariris is written in the Dzubukuá language. It has served as a primary source both in the study of Dzubukuá itself and in modern attempts to determine how the Kariri languages are related to other American Indigenous languages.

Nantes also authored a manuscript history of the missions among the Kariri, Relation de la Mission des Indiens Kariris du Brésil. The work has not been published in its entirety, but various studies about the Kariri have referred to it.
