= Tingui-Botó =

Total population
- 469 (2025)

Regions with significant populations
- Brazil

Languages
- Portuguese language, Dzubukuá language (ritual)

Religion
- Toré

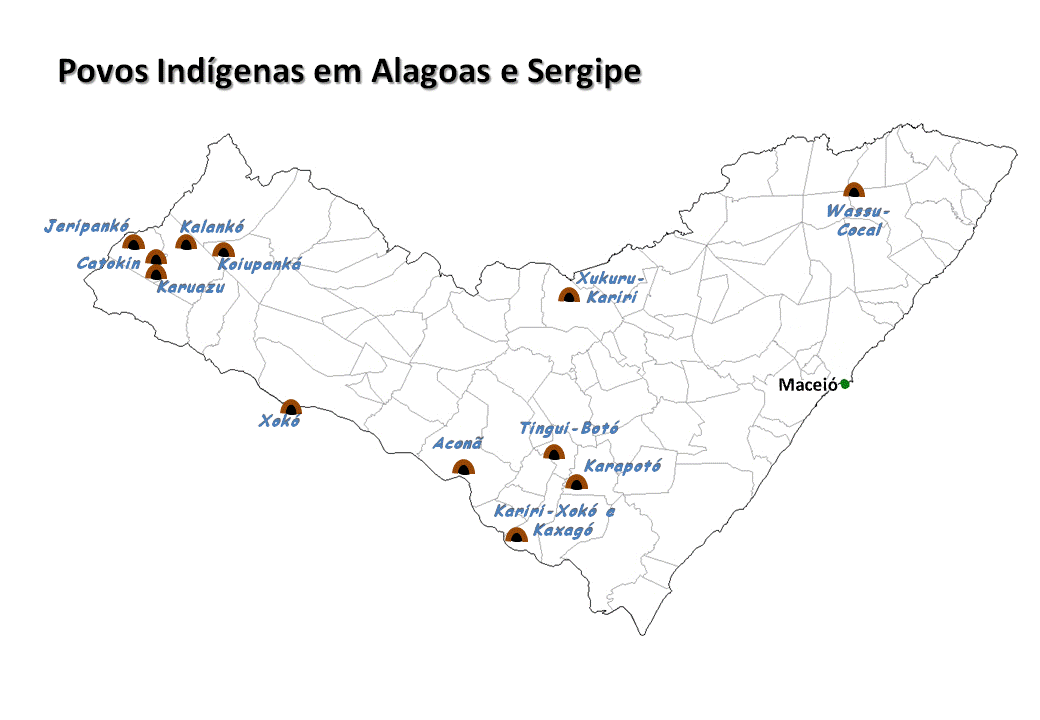
Map of Indigenous peoples in Alagoas

The Tingui-Botó are an Indigenous people of Brazil. In 2025, they numbered 469 people.

== Language ==
The Tingui-Botó use Portuguese and Dzubukuá today.

== Culture ==
The Tingui-Botó practice the Toré religion and the ouricuri ritual.
