= Abacatiara =

Indigenous people of Brazil

Regions with significant populations
- Brazil (São Francisco River)

Languages
- Kariri

The Abacatiara (Abacatuara, Obacatiara, Obacoatiara, Dzubucua-Carirí) were an Indigenous people of Brazil who historically occupied a number of islands along the São Francisco River near modern-day Cabrobó. They spoke Kariri, a now-extinct language isolate. In 1898, the Abacatiara were found on the island of São Pedro Dias.
