= Battle of the Canoes =

Unsuccessful Tamoio ambush against the Portuguese

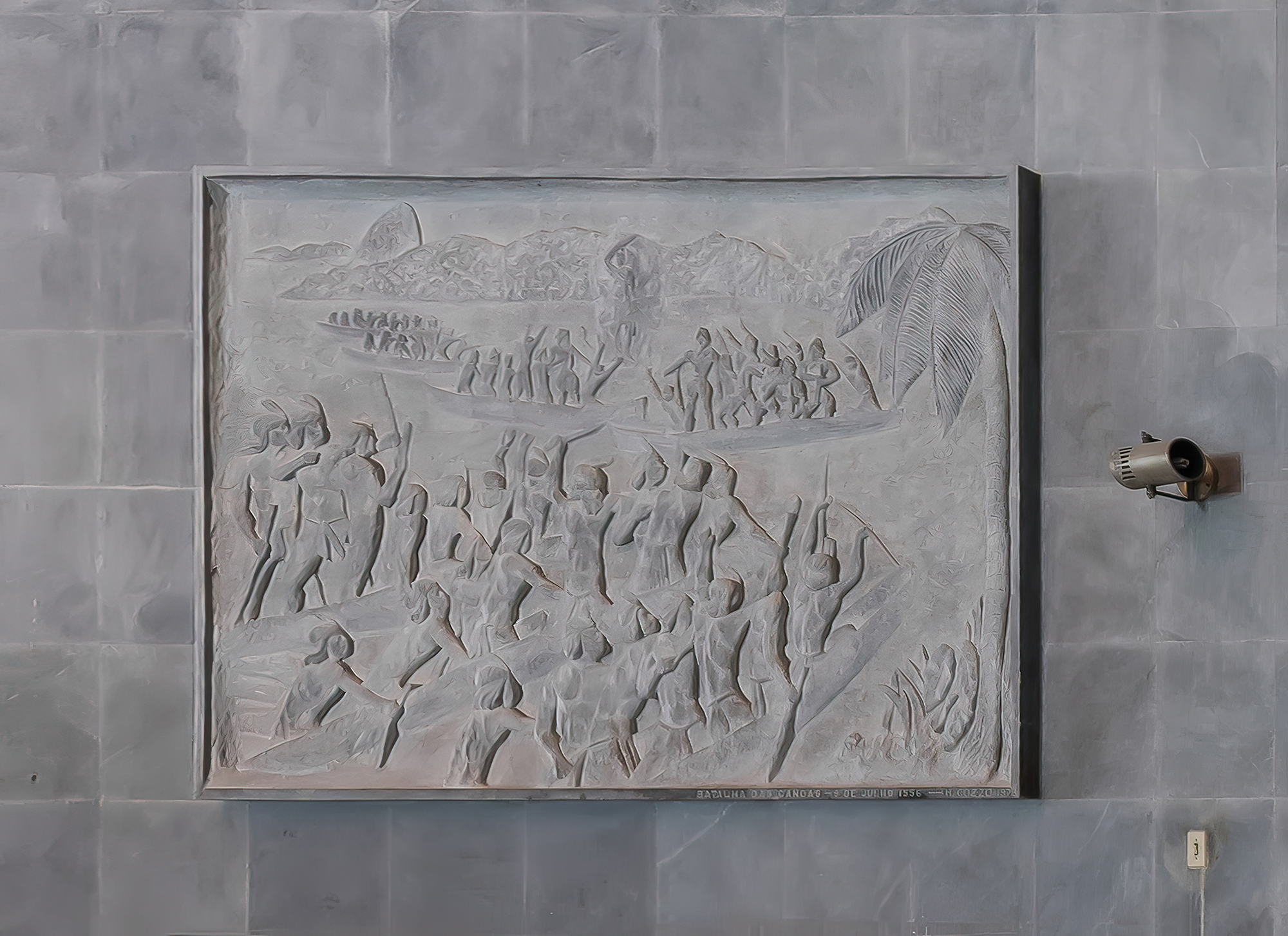
Batalha das Canoas artwork at the Rio de Janeiro Cathedral

The Battle of the Canoes (Portuguese: Batalha das Canoas), also known as the Battle of Guaixará (Portuguese: Batalha de Guaixará), was an unsuccessful French-Tamoio ambush against the Portuguese and their allies. Saint Sebastian was allegedly seen in the midst of the battle. This event is mentioned in the work Auto de São Lourenço by Joseph of Anchieta.

== Account ==
Simão de Vasconcelos recounted the battle at least 90 years after it occurred. According to him, it took place in July 1566. Advised by the French, the Tamoio Indians, with 180 war canoes, 100 of which were commanded by Guaixará, reportedly trapped a man named Francisco Velho, who had gone out to gather wood for the chapel of Saint Sebastian. Estácio de Sá had only four or five canoes to defend him. During the combat, the gunpowder on one of these canoes caught fire, frightening the wife of the leader of the opposing canoes, who called for the Indians to flee, which they did in disorder. The defeated Indians reportedly asked who was the gentleman soldier leaping among the canoes. Anchieta supposedly confirmed that it was Saint Sebastian. Some details of this narrative, such as the date of July 1566, the name Guaixará, and the occupation of Francisco Velho, appear to have been taken from a Latin manuscript currently in the archive of the Society of Jesus, written by Antônio de Matos between 1619 and 1621. Serafim Leite was a scholar who had access to this document.

== In popular culture ==
The episode is mentioned in the work Auto de São Lourenço, authored by Joseph of Anchieta. The lyrical subject in the following excerpt is Aimbirê.

Tupi language	Portuguese language by Eduardo de Almeida Navarro	English language
Asepîak, erimba'e,	Vi, outrora,	I saw, once,
Gûaîxará maranusu.	a grande batalha de Guaixará.	the great battle of Guaixará.
Ygara setakatu.	As canoas eram muitíssimas.	The canoes were very numerous.
Ereîpytybõ îepé,	Embora os ajudasses,	Although you helped them,
erĩ aani! Osyî muru...	oh não! Tremeram os malditos...	oh no! The cursed ones trembled...
Karaíba na setáî;	Os cristãos não eram muitos;	The Christians were not many;
São Sebastião, a'e,	São Sebastião, porém,	Saint Sebastian, however,
omondyk tatá sesé,	ateou fogo nelas,	set fire to them [the canoes],
i mondyîa. N'opytáî	espantando-os. Não ficou	scaring them [the cursed ones] away. No one remained
amõ abá maranápe.	ninguém no lugar da batalha.	in the place of the battle.

== Bibliography ==
- Anchieta, José de (2006). Teatro (in Portuguese). Translated by Navarro, Eduardo de Almeida (2nd ed.). São Paulo: Martins Fontes. ISBN 978-85-336-2142-8.
- Cardoso, Vinicius Miranda (2011). "Favores do glorioso mártir: a memória jesuítica da intervenção de São Sebastião na fundação do Rio de Janeiro, séc. XVII" [Favors of the glorious martyr: the Jesuit memory of the intervention of Saint Sebastian in the foundation of Rio de Janeiro, 17th century]. História Unisinos (in Portuguese). 15 (3). doi:10.4013/htu.2011.153.10. ISSN 2236-1782. Archived from the original on 5 November 2023.
