= Kipeá language =

Extinct Karirian language of Brazil

Kipeá
- Kiriri
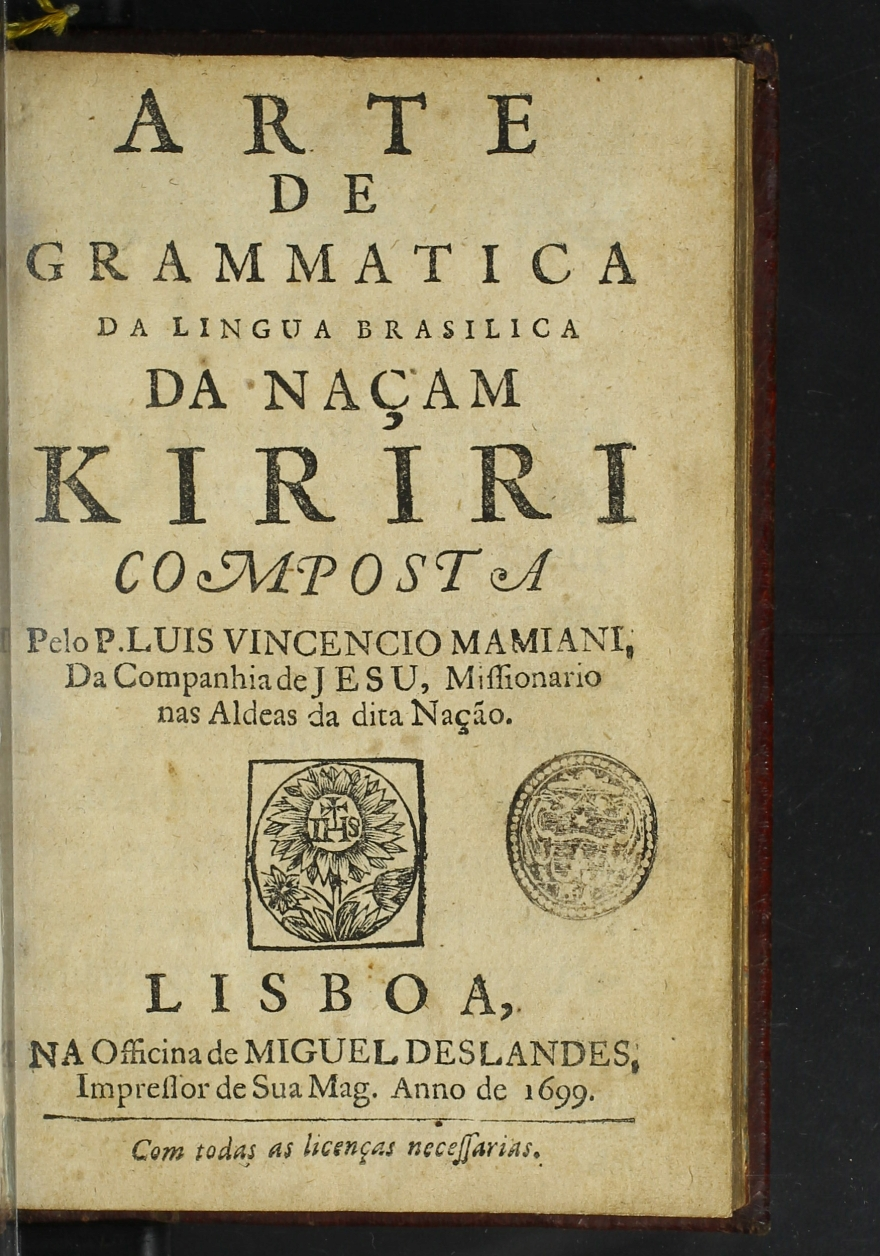
- 1699 grammar of Kipeá
- Native to: Brazil
- Region: Itapicuru River, northeastern Bahia
- Ethnicity: Kiriri people (2,806 Quiriris)
- Era: attested 1698 and 1699
- Revival
- Language family: Karirian: Kipeá

Language codes
- ISO 639-3: None (mis)
- Glottolog: kipe1235
- Linguasphere: 89-CBA-aa

Kipeá (or Kiriri) is an extinct Karirian language or dialect of Brazil. A short grammatical treatise and a catechism were produced in 1698–1699 by the Italian Jesuit priest Luís Vincêncio Mamiani. It exhibits a verb–object–subject word order and an ergative–absolutive alignment, and is typologically analytic, using very few suffixes, which is unusual for the region it was historically spoken in. Modern-day descendents of the Kiriri people have used Kipeá, as well as in conjunction with its sister language/dialect Dzubukuá, as the basis for reviving their language.

== History ==
=== Documentation ===
Among the Kariri varieties, Kipeá is the best documented. There are two main sources for it, namely the Catecismo da doutrina christãa na lingua brasilica da nação kiriri and the Arte de grammatica da lingua brasilica da naçam kiriri, both composed by Mamiani. The Catecismo was published in 1698 with a facsimile edition issued by the Biblioteca Nacional in 1942, while the Arte was published in 1699 with a new edition released in 1877 also by the Biblioteca Nacional, and a German translation by C. von der Gabelentz in 1852 under the title Grammatik der Kiriri-Sprache. (Note: Available here)

Jesuit João de Barros is said to have composed a catechism and a vocabulary of the language. Serafim Leite conjectured that the Arte and the Catecismo were in fact the work of Barros, merely studied and prepared for publication by Mamiani. However, this assumption is considered unlikely, given what Mamiani himself states at the beginning of the Arte, where he writes he "did not deem it time wasted, nor an unnecessary occupation, but rather a very necessary one" to compose a grammar. This is further supported by the testimonies of priests João Mateus Faletto and José Coelho, who granted approval for the publication of the work. Moreover, in the Catecismo, Mamiani claims to have had "twelve years of experience with the language among the Indians".

=== Modern studies ===
Lucien Adam published a comparative study of Dzubukuá, Kipeá, Pedra Branca, and Sabujá in 1897, (Note: Available here) but his work is considered not to have brought any new contribution to the knowledge of Kipeá itself. In 1965, Gilda M. Corrêa de Azevedo completed her master's thesis on it under the supervision of Aryon Rodrigues; it was the first one on an Indigenous language ever produced in Brazil. Later that year, however, the military regime's intervention at the University of Brasília led to the resignation of more than 200 professors, leaving only a few in the Department of Linguistics.

=== Revival ===
The Kariri-Xokó people of Porto Real do Colégio, Alagoas, have been engaged in language revival since 1989 of the Kipeá and Dzubukuá varieties of Kariri, though primarily relying on the latter. In doing this, they have combined lexical material from both varieties; Kipeá is better documented grammatically, and Mamiani's grammar of it had been used in language revival efforts.

== Phonology and orthography ==
According to Azevedo, there is no evidence that allows for reliable statements about the realization of the phonemes, since there are no oral sources, only written documents. She cautions against possible inaccuracies on Mamiani's part, given that he was a 17th-century missionary without specialized phonetic or linguistic training. Azevedo argues the phonological analysis presented in her work does not go beyond a "rudimentary interpretation" of the texts.

=== Consonants ===
Consonantal system of Kipeá (after Azevedo 1965)
		Labial	Dental	Alveolar	Alveo- palatal	Velar	Glottal
Stop	voiceless	p	t	ts	tʃ ⟨ch, tch⟩	k	ʔ
Stop	voiced	b	d	dz	dʒ	(ɡ ⟨g, gh⟩)	
Fricative				s			h
Nasal		m	n		ɲ	ŋ ⟨ng, ngh⟩	
Approximant		w	ɾ		j		

- /tʃ/ is more often transcribed with ⟨ch⟩, although examples in which words are also written with ⟨tch⟩ can be found. Azevedo adopted the affricate /tʃ/ instead of /ʃ/ as the standard for the phoneme because it "fits perfectly within the symmetry of the phonemic system". She states the realization "would fluctuate" between [ʃ] and [tʃ].
- Ribeiro disagrees with Azevedo's reanalysis, which proposes a contrast between /ɡ/ and /ŋ/. He argues ⟨gh⟩ and ⟨g⟩ occur without a preceding ⟨n⟩ in only six words across the entire Kipeá corpus, three of which are "likely" loans and one an interjection, where sounds not found elsewhere in a language's phonemic inventory commonly appear. Ribeiro thus proposes that ⟨ngh⟩ and ⟨gh⟩ represented allophones of a single phoneme.

=== Vowels ===
Vowel system of Kipeá
	Front	Central	Back
Close	i	ɨ	u
Mid	e ẽ		o õ
Open	æ ⟨æ⟩ æ̃	a ã	ɑ̃

- Mamiani describes ⟨æ⟩ as "an intermediate vowel between A and E". Azevedo proposes /æ/, with the realizations [æ] and [ə], the latter occurring in unstressed words, as in ⟨tekiébæ⟩. Zwartjes, however, cautions that for both this intermediate vowel and its nasalized counterpart, there are other possible candidates, such as /ɛ/, /e/, and /ɶ/, and states the information provided by Mamiani is not precise enough to allow for a definitive conclusion.

=== Orthography ===
Mamiani admits only two diacritics in the theoretical introduction, the circumflex and the acute, but also employs the grave throughout his grammar. Zwartjes notes that, although the distinction between them is unclear, there was probably none at all, since on the same page one finds both cradzó and cradzò. Mamiani also occasionally uses the symbol ⟨ę⟩, but provides no information regarding this diacritic. Seabra points out that an occurrence of ⟨ę⟩ in a Latin sentence ("Credis Patrem omnipotentem Creatorem cęli & terræ?") allows one to conclude the symbol was used in place of ⟨æ⟩ to save space in the line; indeed, the typesetter often employed the tilde to replace the letters "n" and "m" to fit the text into columns 2.8 centimeters (1.1 in) wide.

=== Syllable patterns and stress ===
There are three syllable patterns in Kipeá: V, CV, and CɾV, with the first two being the most frequent. The CɾV pattern is rarer. All consonants, except /dʒ/, occur in initial position before a vowel, and all occur in medial position before a vowel; only /p/, /b/, and /k/ occur before /ɾ/. No consonant occurs in final position, except for -h, which appears in the interjections proh and yuh – a usage that Azevedo considers to be an analogy with the spelling of the Portuguese interjections ah and oh. Vowels occur in initial, medial, and final positions, with some restrictions.

Stress in Kipeá is considered to have a "purely demarcative, phonemically non-relevant" function, as it regularly falls on the final syllable of the word. There are however some unstressed words that are interpreted as enclitics.

== Grammar ==
The morphology of the Kipeá language is predominantly isolating and analytic, unusual for a language native to the Americas.

Clauses with one-argument verbs show the verb–intransitive subject order, and those with two-argument verbs show verb–transitive (direct) object–transitive subject, where the transitive subject is marked by the ergative preposition no.

si-te karai
3-come white.man
"The white man comes."

si-pa kradzo no karai
3-kill cow ERG white.man
"The white man kills the cow."

Kipeá has prepositions but not postpositions. If an adposition relates to a pronoun, it may be prefixed to the adposition. Some adpositions have different allomorphs when they follow a pronoun or pronominal prefix.

pa kɾi do udza
kill PERFV with knife
"It was killed with a knife."

di kɾi do i-de
give PERFV to 3-mother
"He has given to his mother."

di kɾi i-djoho
give PERFV 3-to
"He has given to her."

=== Noun classifiers ===
Nouns are not overtly marked for class in Kipeá. Instead, classifiers are attached to quantifiers, which are placed before the head noun, and adjectives describing "dimension, consistency and colour, according to the shape of the noun's referents", found after the noun. 12 classifier prefixes are found in Kipeá.

Kipeá noun classifiers
gloss	Classifier
hills, stools, dishes, foreheads, etc.	be-
birds, stones, stars, round objects (e.g. beads, fruit, eyes. etc.)	kro-
liquids, rivers	kru-
clusters, bunches	epru-
sticks, legs, wooden objects	he-
ropes, vines, threads, snakes	ho-, hoi-
iron objects, bones, pointed things	ja-
edible roots	mu-, mui-
holes, wells, mouths, fields, valleys, fenced spaces	nu-
clothes, fabric, furs	ro-
roads, conversations, speeches, stories	woro-
houses, arrows, containers, corncobs, living beings excluding birds, all otherwise unspecified nouns	bu-

== Sample text ==
Below is the Lord's Prayer in Kipeá, according to Luís Vincêncio Mamiani in his 1698 catechism:

Bo cupadzûá dibárí mó arãkié, dó netsówonhé adzé inháá; dó dí ecanghité hidyodé; dó moró acáté mó radá, moró mó arãkié; dó dí hiamítẽdé ená hidiohodé dó ighŷ; dó prieré mó hibuânghetẽdé; moró siprí hirédé dó dibuângherí hiaídé; dó dikyé ená hihẽbupídé nósumarã anhí; dó nunhé hietçãdé ená bóburété. Amen Jesu.

== Bibliography ==
- Adam, Lucien (1897). Matériaux pour servir à l'établissement d'une grammaire comparée des dialectes de la famille Kariri [Materials to serve for the establishment of a comparative grammar of the dialects of the Kariri family] (in French). Paris: Maisonneuve. Archived from the original on 21 May 2025.
- Azevedo, Gilda Maria Corrêa de (1965). Língua Kiriri: descrição do dialeto Kipeá [Kiriri language: description of the Kipeá dialect] (in Portuguese). Brasília: Universidade de Brasília. Archived from the original on 16 July 2025.
- Mamiani, Luis Vincencio (1698). Deslandes, Miguel (ed.). Catecismo da doutrina christãa na lingua brasilica da nação kiriri [Catechism of the Christian doctrine in the Brasílica language of the Kiriri nation] (in Portuguese). Lisbon. Archived from the original on 1 April 2025.
- Mamiani, Luis Vincencio (1699). Deslandes, Miguel (ed.). Arte de grammatica da lingua brasilica da naçam kiriri [Art of grammar of the Brasílica language of the Kiriri nation] (in Portuguese). Lisbon. Archived from the original on 29 April 2025.
- Ribeiro, Eduardo Rivail (2009). "Tapuya connections: language contact in eastern Brazil". LIAMES. 9 (1). doi:10.20396/liames.v9i1.1463. Archived from the original on 12 July 2024.
- Rodrigues, Aryon D. (1999). "Macro-Jê". In Dixon, R. M. W.; Aikhenvald, Alexandra Y. (eds.). The Amazonian Languages. Cambridge Language Surveys. New York: Cambridge University Press. ISBN 978-0-521-57021-3. Archived from the original on 27 March 2025.
- Seabra, Ricky (2017). "Contribuições para a leitura adequada da Doutrina Christãa na Língua Brasílica da Nação Kiriri de autoria do padre jesuíta Luiz Vincencio Mamiani (1698)" [Contributions to the proper reading of the Catechism of the Christian Doctrine in the Brasílica Language of the Kiriri Nation authored by the Jesuit priest Luiz Vincencio Mamiani (1698)]. Revista Brasileira de Linguística Antropológica (in Portuguese). 9 (2). doi:10.26512/rbla.v9i2.19090. Archived from the original on 21 April 2025.
- Seki, Lucy (1999). "A Lingüística Indígena no Brasil" [The Indigenous Linguistics in Brazil]. D.E.L.T.A. (in Portuguese). 15 (Special): 257–290. doi:10.1590/S0102-44501999000300011. eISSN 1678-460X. ISSN 0102-4450. Archived from the original on 28 February 2024.
- Zwartjes, Otto (2011). Portuguese Missionary Grammars in Asia, Africa and Brazil, 1550–1800. Studies in the History of the Language Sciences. John Benjamins Publishing Company. doi:10.1075/sihols.117. ISBN 978-90-272-8325-2. ISSN 0304-0720. LCCN 2011033750.
