= Biblioteca Brasiliana Guita e José Mindlin =

Library in São Paulo, Brazil

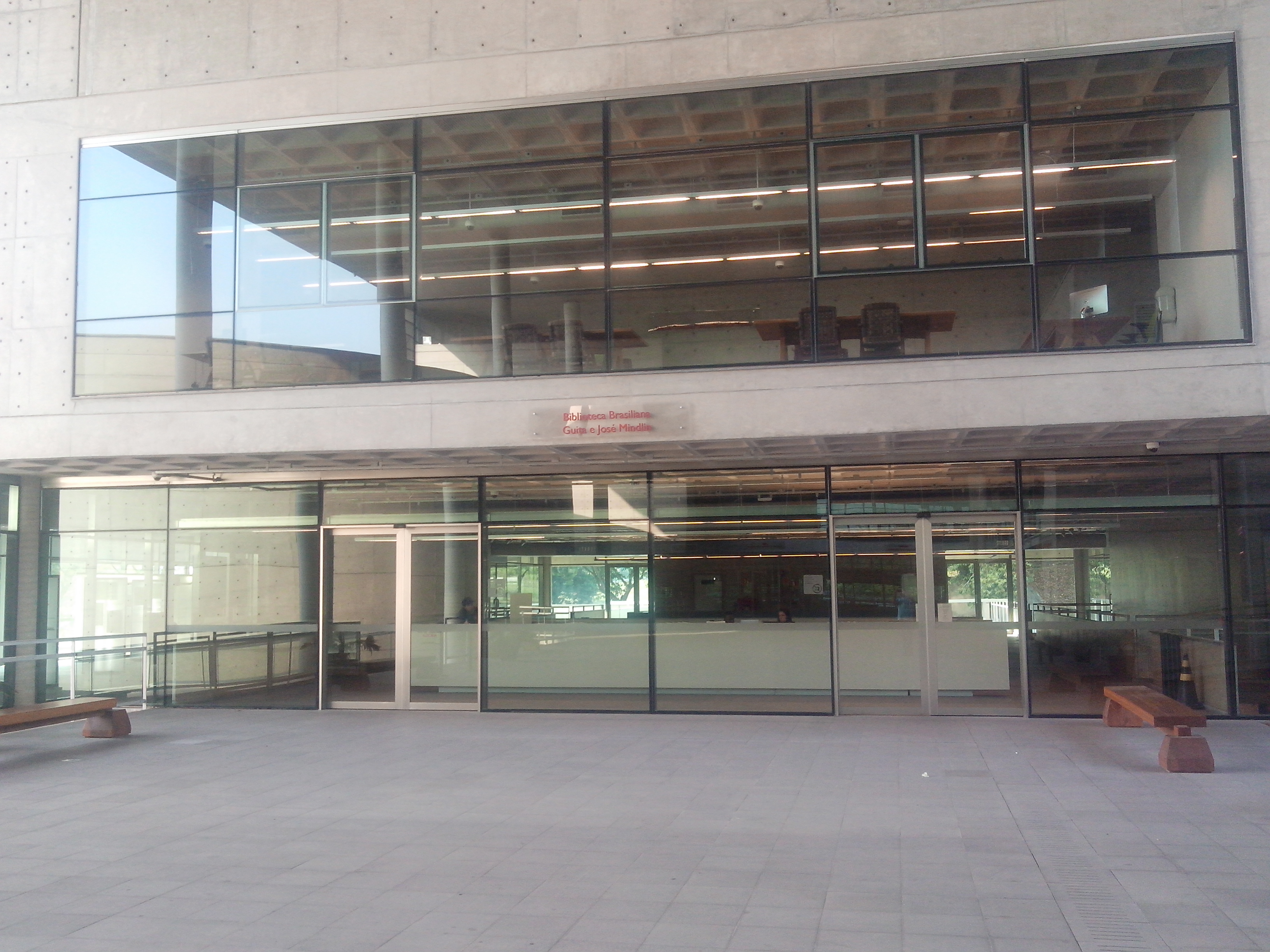
- Biblioteca Brasiliana Guita e José Mindlin
- Established: 2013
- Location: São Paulo, Brazil
- Coordinates: 23°33′44″S 46°43′20″W
- Type: Public
- Librarian: Rodrigo M. Garcia; CRB8ª: SP-007584/O
- Architects: Eduardo de Almeida; Rodrigo Mindlin Loeb
- Website: bbm.usp.br

The Biblioteca Brasiliana Guita e José Mindlin (BBM) is a library in São Paulo, Brazil. The library was created to hold the Brazilian collection gathered throughout eighty years by José Mindlin and his wife Guita, began in January 2005 for important works for understanding the culture and history of Brazil compose the collection donated to the University of São Paulo in 2006. Among them, there are works of literature and history, travellers’ accounts, historical and literary manuscripts, documents, journals, maps, scientific and didactic books, iconography and artists’ books.

The building of the Brazilian Special Collections, where BBM is located, was officially opened on March 23, 2013 in the University of São Paulo (West Zone of São Paulo). There are approximately 60 thousand volumes in the collection. Other items that composed the collection and deserve to be highlighted include first editions books, maps, diaries, art albums, journals, etc.

== The building of the BBM ==
The building of the Brazilian Special Collections was inaugurated on March 23, 2013 with the presence of João Grandino Rodas, Dean of USP, Fernando Haddad, Mayor of São Paulo, and Marta Suplicy, Minister of Culture.

In addition to Biblioteca Brasiliana, it also holds the collection of the Institute for Brazilian Studies (IEB) and counts with bookstore (EDUSP), cafeteria, classrooms, exhibition halls and auditorium with capacity for about 300 people.

The architecture project was developed by the offices of Eduardo de Almeida and Rodrigo Mindlin Loeb, with the assessorship of the Architecture and Urbanism College, University of São Paulo. They took as reference the most respected American libraries, such as the Beinecke Library, at Yale University, the Morgan Library, the New York Public Library and the Library of Congress, as well as the National Library of Paris.

== History ==
In 2002, Professor István Jancsó, then director of the Institute for Brazilian Studies (IEB) at USP, together with José Mindlin designed the construction of a modern complex building capable of housing the two important Brazilian Collections of USP (of IEB itself, founded in 1962 by the historian Sérgio Buarque de Holanda, and that of José and Guita Mindlin). Biblioteca Brasiliana Guita e José Mindlin, as institution of the University of São Paulo, was created because of this project (initiated in 2005), and the donation of the collection was confirmed in a ceremony carried out on May 17, 2006. The new headquarters of the library was inaugurated on March 23, 2013. The collection was initially kept in the particular library of José Mindlin, in Brooklin, SP. Part of the collection that was donated to USP was in fact from Rubens Borba de Morais, a bibliophile who left his own library to José and Guita Mindlin before dying. José Mindlin himself requested his grandson, Rodrigo Mindlin Loeb, to design the architectural project of the building.

== Collection ==
The collection is composed by works about Brazil, both by Brazilian authors and by foreign authors. It counts with some of the most famous and rare works, as for example: The first edition of O Guarani (1857), by José de Alencar, that took 17 years to be concluded. Translations made by Brazilian writers, as for example the one made by Machado de Assis of Les travailleurs de la mer, by Victor Hugo, in 1866. Some rare books, famous by their dedications, as one of the copies of Tu, Só Tu, Puro Amor, also by Machado de Assis, dedicated to Joaquim Nabuco. Some manuscripts, as the original of Banguê, by José Lins do Rego, 29 diaries of Condessa do Barral and a series of originals of Graciliano Ramos and Guimarães Rosa.

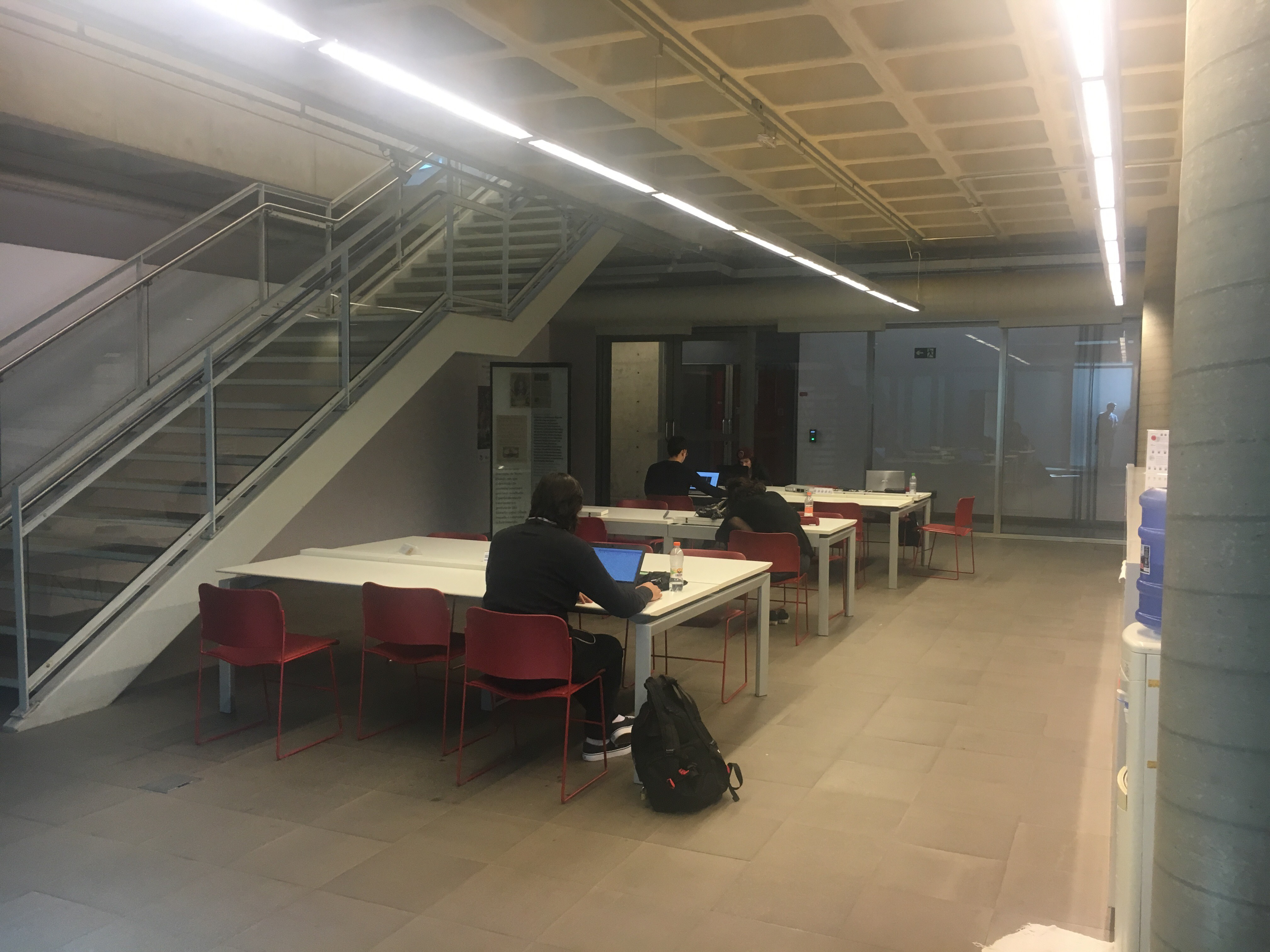
Study room, located on the bottom floor.

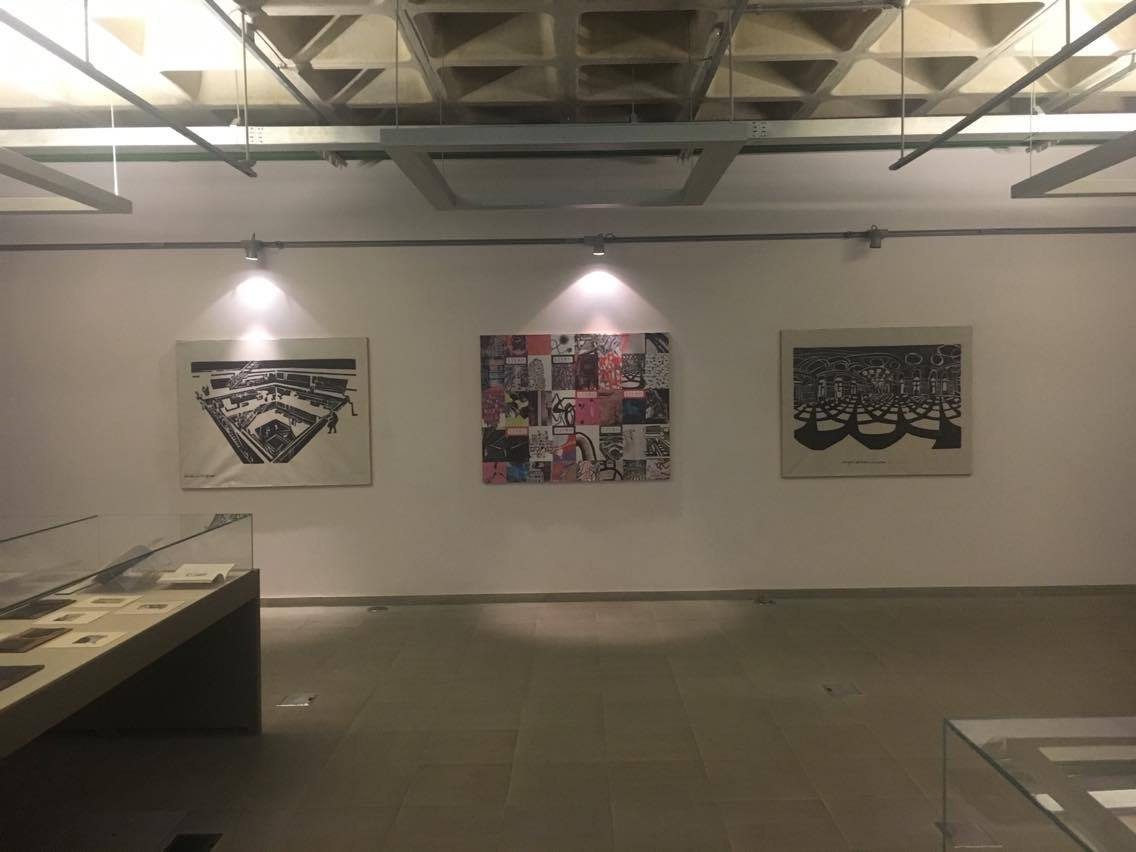
Art and literature exposition room.

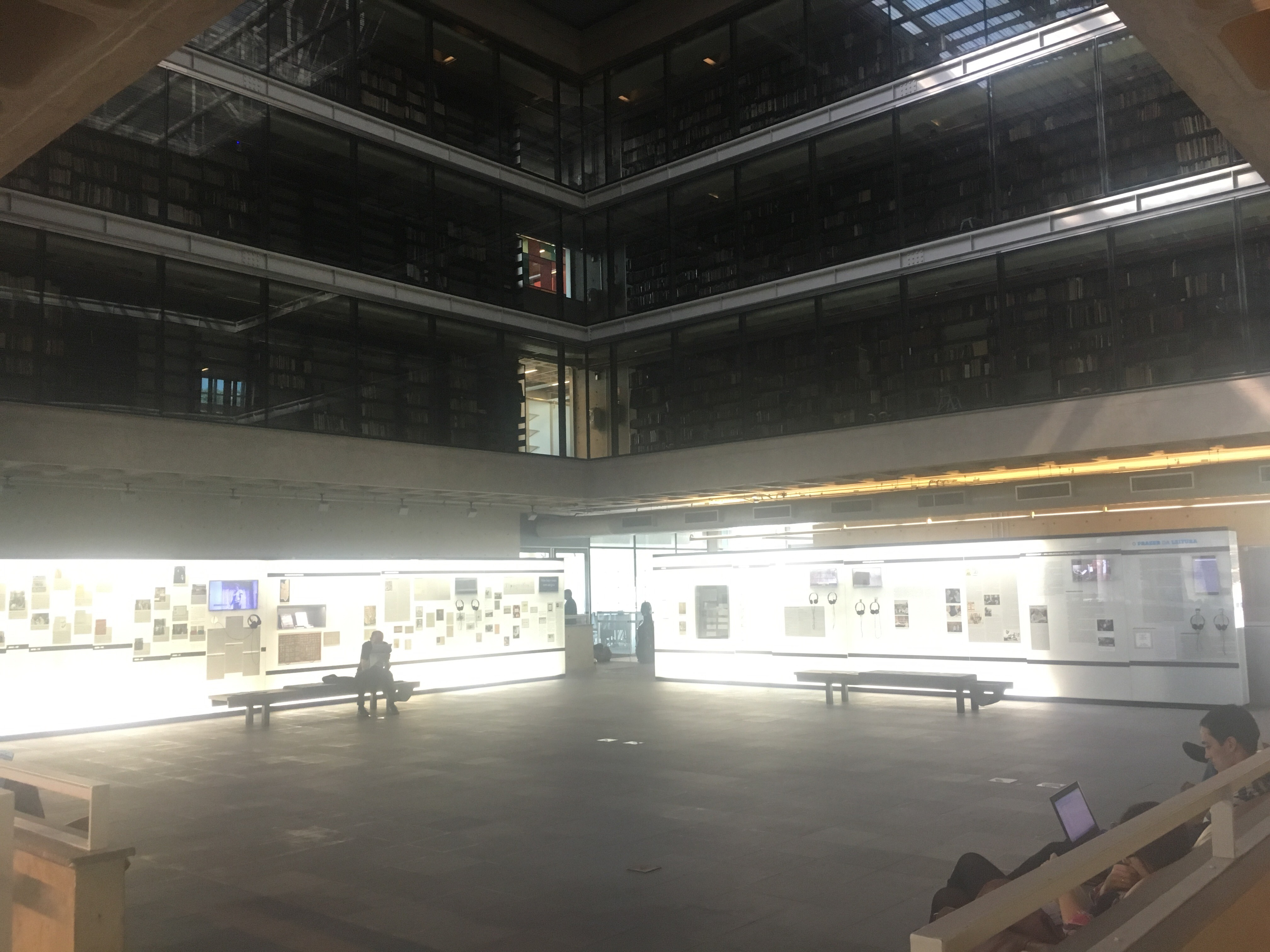
Library's ground floor.

== The present time ==
Currently, BBM has a multipurpose room aimed at showing artistic and literary expositions. The expositions are always temporary. There is also an auditorium in the complex, where eventually occurs artistic exhibitions, such as orchestras, plays, among others. To access the collection, it is necessary to schedule a visit with antecedence to obtain authorization. But all the remaining portion is free for the visit. The technical and competent team of Librarians (one of them being Rodrigo M. Garcia Rodrigo M. Garcia) of the Library and Documentation Service (SBD) is responsible for managing the physical collection from information processing, curation of works, reference service, acquisition; and also the digital collection, from the entire digitization process to the availability of digitized versions in its Digital Library (BBM Digital).

== Structure ==
Biblioteca Brasiliana Guita e José Mindlin is located within an architectural complex of approximately 215,278 square feet, with cafeteria, bookstore, auditorium, collection rooms, study room, classrooms, administration, consultation, and restoration of works. Moreover, the two libraries are separated, and the access is made through a covered esplanade.

The library has a quadrangular format and is composed by two floors with panoramic windows, with sights for the center of the building. In the interior of the ground floor are two walls with information on the life of José Mindlin and on the library. The information are presented in timeline. In addition, there are walls that bring more information on the collection, the works, or the authors of the works. In the architectural project of the building, a bioclimatic concept was applied to protect and keep preserved diverse rare works.

== In the Internet ==
The collection can be accessed online together with all the collection of the University of São Paulo.[12] Digital BBM [13] makes available more than 3,000 works in open access. These works are composed by diverse authors, as, for example, José de Alencar.

== See also ==
- List of libraries in Brazil
