= Ministry of Foreign Affairs (Paraguay) =

Government ministry of Paraguay

The Ministry of Foreign Affairs (Spanish: Ministerio de Relaciones Exteriores) is a Paraguayan government ministry which oversees the foreign relations of Paraguay.
