= Antenor Nascentes =

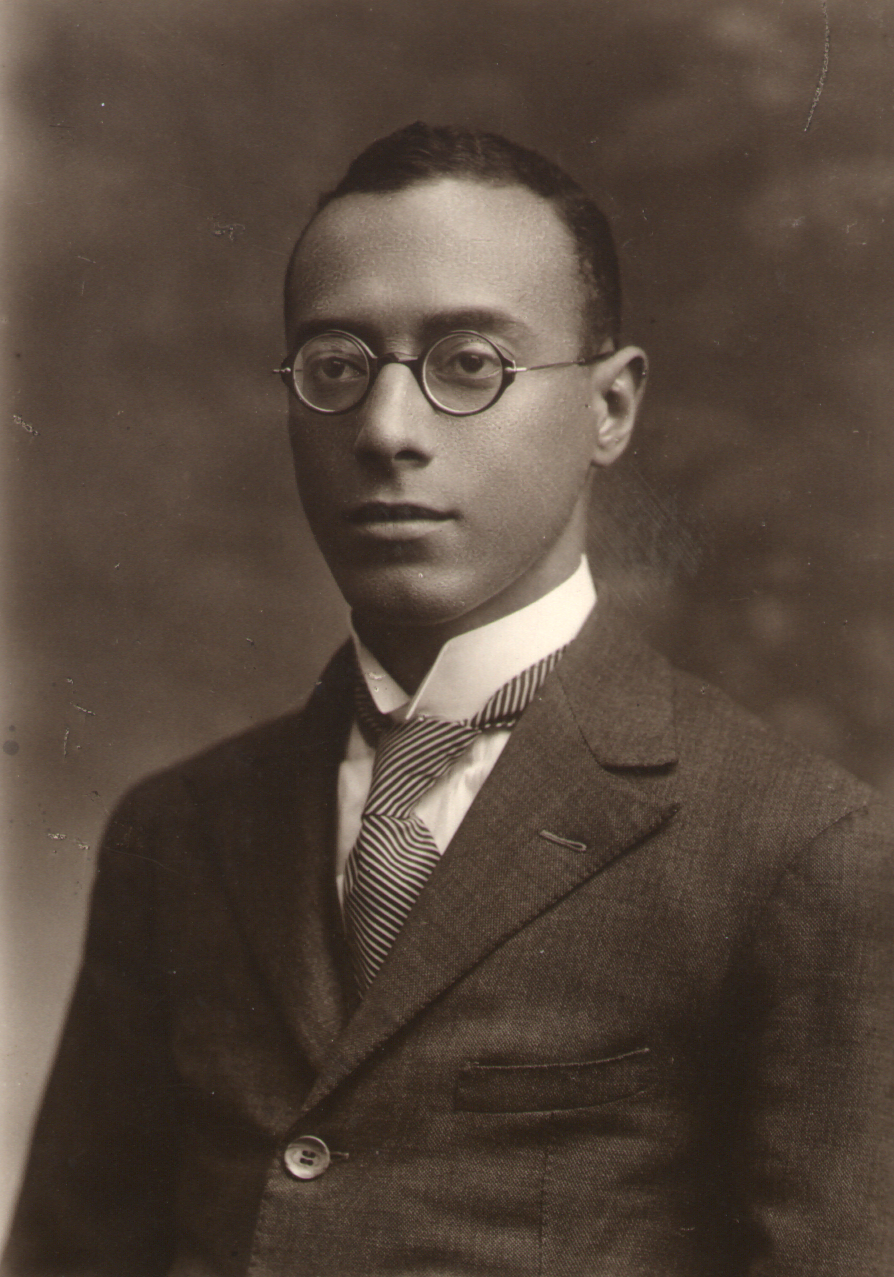
Antenor Nascentes

Antenor Nascentes (19 June 1886 – 6 September 1972) was a Brazilian philologist, etymologist, and lexicographer.

He wrote the first etymological dictionary of Brazil. He also had an interest in dialect and experimental phonetics. He did analysis of popular speech in Rio de Janeiro in 1922. In 1962 he won the Prêmio Machado de Assis.
