= Aryon Rodrigues =

Brazilian linguist (1925–2014)

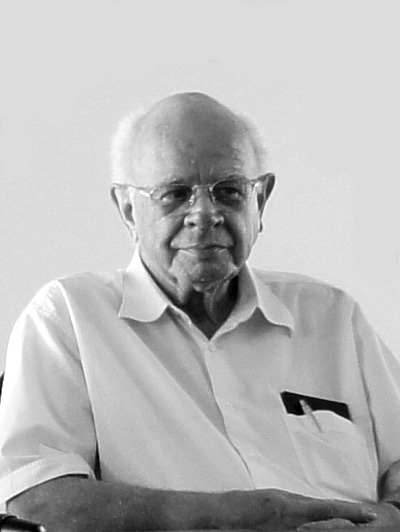
- Born: Aryon Dall'Igna Rodrigues; 4 July 1925; Curitiba, Brazil
- Died: 24 April 2014 (aged 88); Brasília, Brazil
- Occupation: Linguist

Academic work
- Main interests: Indigenous languages of South America, Tupian languages

Aryon Dall'Igna Rodrigues (4 July 1925 – 24 April 2014) was a Brazilian linguist, considered one of the most renowned researchers of the indigenous languages of Brazil.

== Education and early career ==
In 1959, Rodrigues was the first Brazilian to obtain a PhD in linguistics at the University of Hamburg. Aryon Rodrigues was invited by Darcy Ribeiro to organize the first post-graduate program in Linguistics in Brazil, in the recently founded the University of Brasília (UnB). Aryon left UnB following the coup in 1964, in solidarity with his colleagues dismissed and persecuted by the military, moving to the Federal University of Rio de Janeiro (UFRJ) and later to the State University of Campinas (UNICAMP).

== Research and publications ==
Throughout his career, which lasted nearly seventy years, he dedicated himself to the analysis of various languages such as Xetá and Tupinambá, of the Tupi–Guarani family, and Kipeá of the Kariri family (Macro-Jê). In addition to descriptive and theoretical works in linguistics, Rodrigues contributed to the study of historical and comparative linguistics of the indígenous languages of the continent, particularly of the Tupi family. He proposed the Je–Tupi–Carib hypothesis, which links Tupí, Macro-Jê and Karíb together as part of the same macrofamily.

Aryon Rodrigues published more than 150 scientific works, among them articles, book chapters and books. He created and directed the Laboratório de Línguas Indígenas (LALI) at UnB, and was one of the creators and editors of the Revista Brasileira de Linguística Antropológica (RBLA). In January 2013, he participated in the creation of the Instituto Aryon Dall'Igna Rodrigues (IADR), which will serve as the repository of his papers. Rodrigues died on 24 April 2014.

== Personal life ==
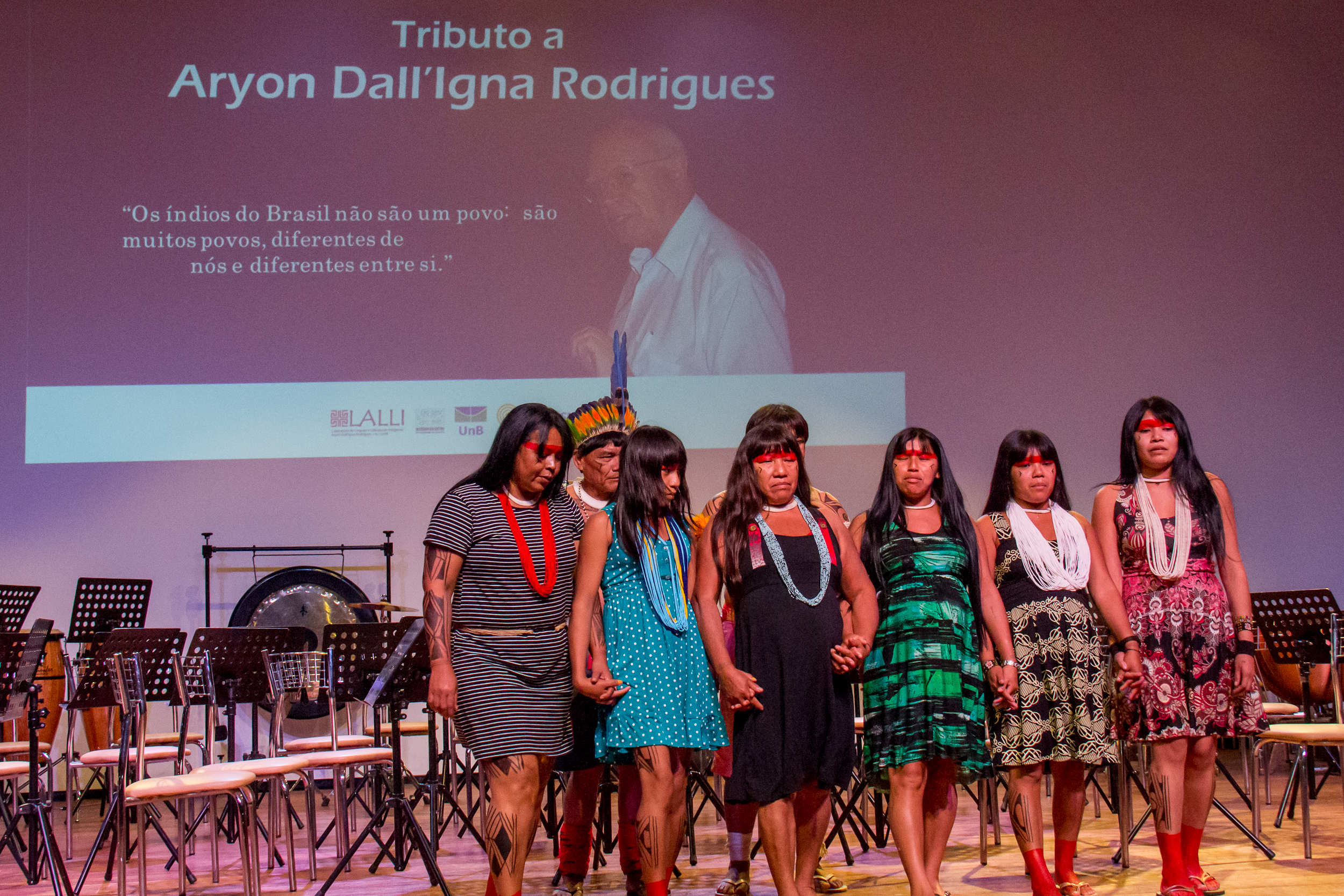
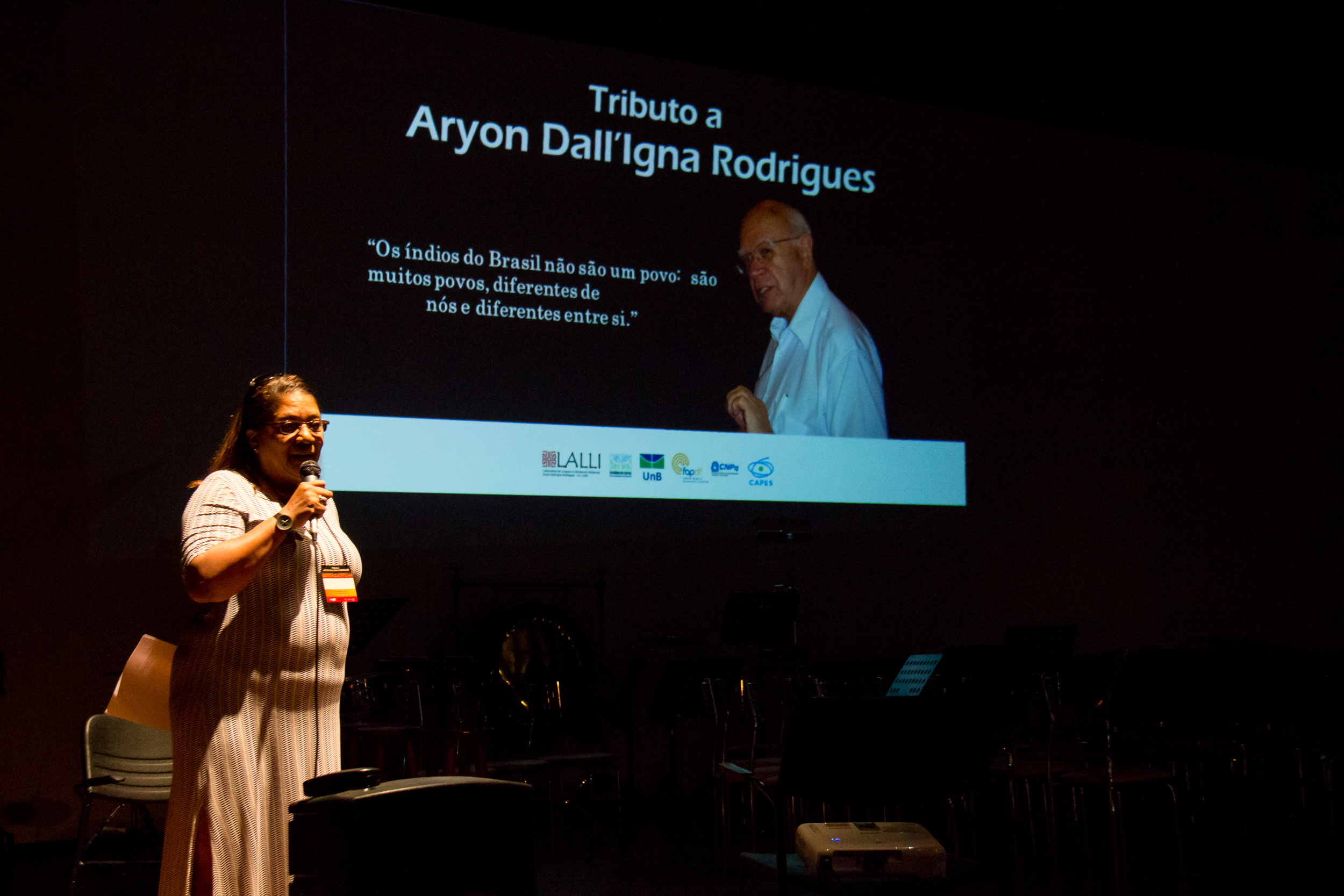
Tribute by the Institute of Letters of the University of Brasília to Aryon Rodrigues in 2016

As of 2012, Rodrigues was divorced and the father of three children: the eldest, Marcelo Bruno Rodrigues, followed by Berenice Helena Rodrigues, and the youngest, Tiago Renato Rodrigues. He died on 24 April 2014, after being hospitalized for intestinal obstruction surgery. Prior to the procedure, he suffered a cardiac arrest, and in the intensive care unit, multiple organ failure was diagnosed. His wake was held at the Campo da Boa Esperança Cemetery the following day, and on 26 April, Rodrigues's body was cremated at the Jardim Metropolitano Cemetery in Valparaíso de Goiás.

On 5 August 2016, a posthumous tribute to Rodrigues took place at the University of Brasília. Flute players from the Xingu and the Brasília Symphony Orchestra performed, with pieces by Villa-Lobos and Carlos Gomes in the repertoire. Among the guests were anthropologist Betty Mindlin and linguist Terrence Kaufman. Tributes were also given in Tupi.

== See also ==
- Etymology of Curitiba
