= Katembri language =

Extinct language of Brazil

Katembrí
- Native to: Brazil
- Region: Banzaê and Quijingue, Bahia
- Ethnicity: Katembrí
- Extinct: c. 1957
- Language family: Kariri–unidentified: Katembrí

Language codes
- ISO 639-3: None (mis)
- Glottolog: None kari1254 Kariri
- Linguasphere: 89-FAA-aa

Katembri (Catrimbi, Kiriri of Mirandela) is an extinct Indigenous language of Bahia, northeastern Brazil, thought to have been spoken by the Katembri people of the historical mission of Saco dos Morcegos, presently located in Mirandela. Its vocabulary consists of a mixture of vocabulary from the Kariri language and an unidentified language, considered to have been that of the Katembri.

== History ==
The last fluent speakers of the language were reported to have died around 1957.

=== Documentation ===
It is known from about 50 words collected from a notebook owned by Josias Rodriguez, the Capitão of the Indian Protection Service (SPI) post of Mirandela, and copied by Alfred Métraux during a 1950 visit to the region. Rodriguez himself only knew two or three words in the language, but the notebook had the words awkwardly written in it by a young Kiriri who had completed primary school. Some more vocabulary, totalling about 100 words, collected in 1961 by SIL linguist Wilbur Pickering from João Manoel Domingo, an elderly rememberer from Mirandela, Banzaê, Bahia, who only knew some words in the language, a manuscript by Frederico Edelweiss from Domingo as well, and a 1967 wordlist collected by Maria de Lourdes Bandeira and published in 1972, also from Domingo, as well as two other rememberers.

== Classification ==
Initially, Métraux and the Czech linguist Čestmír Loukotka thought "Katembri" to be an isolated language. Loukotka found only a few similarities to the Kariri language. It was classified as one of the 109 independent families and languages in the classification of Loukotka and French linguist Paul Rivet. Morris Swadesh, in his 1959 classification, grouped "Mirandela" as a member of his "Macro-Carib" family, along with the Cariban languages, Kariri, the nearly extinct languages Taruma and Guató, and the extinct Jirajaran languages. Terrence Kaufman (1994) proposed to link it exclusively with Taruma, based on the classifications of Swadesh and Joseph Greenberg, although this has not been accepted by other scholars. Its vocabulary is composed of primarily Kariri words with a number of vocabulary items coming from an unidentified language. Raoul Zamponi (2026) concludes that

It seems most likely that the non-Karirí native words gathered around Mirandela belong to the unattested language of a disappeared group once living not far from the town, called Katembri or Catrimbí.

The online language database Glottolog interprets documentation of the language as belonging to a continuation of Kipeá, a dialect of the Kariri language.

== Geographic distribution ==
Katembri was spoken at the mission of Saco dos Morcegos, now within Mirandela, Bahia. Three Indigenous peoples lived at the mission in 1759, the Masakará (who spoke a Kamakã language), the Kiriri people and the Katembri. According to Czech linguist Čestmír Loukotka, the vocabulary does not coincide with Masakará and only a few do with Kariri; the rest are entirely different. Métraux thus concluded that the vocabulary he had copied was that of the language of the Katembri.

== Vocabulary ==
=== Meader (1978) ===
Wilbur Pickering collected the following wordlist in 1961 from Domingo:

Portuguese gloss (original)	English gloss (translated)	Kiriri
água	water	soˈdɛ̨
barriga	belly	mudu
cabeça	head	kʌ̨sʌˈbu
cachorro	dog	poⁱˈo
carne de boi	beef	křaˈzɔ
casa	home	kɔkɔtataˈpʌ̨ιnˈtɛu
cobra	snake	ˈuʌ̨ŋgiu
dentes	teeth	uiˈsa
fogo	fire	řuˈɔ infɔiŋkiřiři
fumo	smoke	boˈze
língua	tongue	ˈtʌ̨naˈdu
mandioca	cassava	tokʸʌ̨
milho	corn	paiˈ hɛkinikři
milho verde	green corn	niˈkři
mulher	woman	tʌ̨nʌˈzu
nariz	nose	lʌmbiˈzu
olhos	eyes	uˈipɔ
onça	jaguar	kosoˈbu inšiˈato
orelhas	ears	kombɛˈñuy
papagaio	parrot	ɔřoɔ
perto	near	křaˈbo
pés	foot	bʌbɛⁱˈu
sal	salt	ˈįñʌ̨ñį
sol	sun	buˈzofɔˈši
sujo	dirty	ikřɛ
velho	old	šiˈbɔ
abóbora	pumpkin	křuñaˈvɔ
(está) alegre	(be) happy	sιsιˈkři
andar no mato	go into the bush	dořoˈřo
ave (arapuá)	type of bird	kakiki
ave (inambu)	tinamou	hoiˈpa
batata	potato	břuziˈřundada
bater (?)	hit (?)	dɔˈpɔ
branco	white	ˈkařai
cachimbo	smoking pipe	paˈu
camaleão	chameleon	bodoˈyo
carregado	loaded	pɛdiˈpi
cavalo	horse	kabaˈřu
comida gostosa	delicious food	duˈhɛ
coxa	thigh	ˈkokulˈdu
criação	creation	buzuřu
cutia	agouti	foⁱˈpřu
dedos	fingers	poˈmɔdoˈi
deus	God	tuˈpo
dinheiro	money	kɛⁱˈu
ema	rhea	buˈʌ̨
faca (arco?)	knife (bow?)	uˈza
feijão	bean	břuˈzohɔˈši
um tipo de fruta	a type of fruit	com
miolo	core	kɔˈpɛ
gato	cat	pʌ̨ñɔ̨
índio	Indian	ʌ̨ˈį
jabuti	red-footed tortoise or yellow-footed tortoise	samˈbo
jacu (ave)	jacu (Penelope)	kakika
joelho	knee	kɔkabɛkɛ
maltrapilho	person wearing shabby clothes	hundiřɔ
manco	lame	uʌnˈtʸɔ
melão	melon	přɛˈzɛnuda
mentira	lie (not truth)	zoˈpřɛ
muita gente	many people	dodoˈši
muito obrigado	Thank you very much.	buřɛˈdu poⁱo
mulher bonita	beautiful woman	kařabuˈšɛ
peba	six-banded armadillo	bɛˈřɔ
peneirar	sift	koha
pessoa amarela	yellow person	křuaˈřʌ̨
pessoa vermelha	red person	bɛřoˈhɛ
pestana	eyelash	pʌ̨nadu
preto	black	šɛŋˈgɛ
quadril	hip	kaⁱuˈɛ
quati	coati	ˈbizaui
quente	hot	daˈsả
raposa	fox	iaˈka
raso	shallow	ˈtařořo
sacola	bag	doˈbɛ
sene	senile	bɔdɔkɔpři
surdo	deaf	ˈbɛñamu
tamanduá	tamandua	iaˈzu
tatu	armadillo	ˈbuzuku
urubu	vulture	ˈkikɔ
veado	deer	buko
verdade	truth	fiˈzo
à vontade	at ease	nɛˈta
(está) zangado	(be) angry	pɔkɛˈdɛ

=== Bandeira (1972) ===
The wordlists of Kariri of Mirandela by Bandeira (1972) and Edelweiss are presented below.

Gloss	Bandeira	Edelweiss
corn meal	maiˈru	maiki
manioc	miˈcu	tökiö
turtle	sãˈbo	çambô
horse	kabaˈru	kabarú
ox, cow	kraˈzɔ	krazó
deer	buˈkɪ	bukä
smoking pipe	paˈu	pöu
smoke	boˈze	bozêˈniti
dry root	pɔˈha	
chest	kraˈbu	krabú
to be shining	zoˈzo	
white person	karaˈi	Karai
priest	karaˈi uaˈrɛ	
God	tuˈpã	tupõ
ear	kũbẽˈñã	cumbenhum
eye	iˈpɔ	ipó
nose	lambiˈzu	lambizü
arm	ĩˈbɔ	
hand	miˈzã	
tooth, teeth	uiˈsa	ycá
femur	kɔkuˈdu	kôkudu
Indigenous person, caboclo	uãˈñø	uiaô, uãnhô
woman	tiˈzi	tözö
white person with red hair	karaˈi bɛrɔˈhɛ	
red	bɛrɔˈhɛ	berohé
truth	piˈzã	
lie	zuˈprɛ	
angry	pɔkɛˈdɛ	pokedé
happy	usisiˈkri	cixikrã
drunk	ɔdɔmaraĩˈhu	
strike, blow	dɔˈpɔ	dopó
money	ĩtaĩˈu	
knife, bow	iaˈza, uˈza	viazá 'knife'
round thing	tʊˈbʊ	
mountain of stone	bɔdɔkrɔˈpi	bodókopri
cachaça	zuˈru	yzurú
yellow	krɔẽˈrã	kroãrã
fox	iaˈka	iacá
snake	uãgiˈu	anguiú
tongue	tʊnʊˈdʊ	tanadu
eyelashes, eyebrows	panəˈdu	panadô
belly	muˈdu	môdú
foot	bebaˈɪa	bôbeiú
hair, head	kʊsʊˈbu	coçobú
fingers, pebbles	kɔmɔˈdɔi	komodoi
buttocks, seat	kaiuˈɛ	kaiué
coati	bizaˈui	bizauí
jaguar	kɔsˈbo	köçöbu buhy
chachalaca	kakiˈki	kakiki
Penelope	kakiˈka	kakika
agouti	fɔiˈpru	koipru
greater rhea	buˈã	buã
collared peccary	haˈu	hãu (racú)
tinamou	hoiˈpa	hoipá
New World vulture	kiˈkɔ	kykó
six-banded armadillo	beˈrɔ	beró
nine-banded armadillo	buziˈki	buzükü
chameleon	kraiaˈɪɔ	kraiaró
Tupinambis	bodoˈio	bodoiú
lizard	boˈdo	bodó
goats	kɔbiˈhi	kohiˈbi
cat (domestic)	pʊˈiʊ	päiö
pig	kuˈre	kurê
striped hog-nosed skunk	kɔruˈo	
corn	paiˈhɛkriniˈki	payhé
potato	buzirũdaˈda	büzirũdadá
watermelon	buziˈrũ	buzirũ
pumpkin, gourd	kũñaˈvɔ	cunhavó
manioc flour	tõˈnã; tãˈno	tanú
tapioca	kɛnɛˈuɛ	kenêué
child	prɛzɛnuˈda	prezenudá
old	siˈbɔ	xibó
old person bent over	seˈpro	cêprô
sarará	karaˈi buˈsɛ	
well-dressed woman	kruˈre	
tall person	kiˈpri	kipri
slovenly	pɔiduˈdu	
hammock	kɔiˈa	koiá
hammock for children	tiˈpɔia	tipoia
sling for carrying children	gaˈgu	
clothing	iˈɪɔ	uiró
house	kɔfɔtataˈpã	cohotatapã
Mirandela	zurudaˈdɛ	zurudadé
sun	buzʊfoˈsi	buzofoxi
mountain	bɔdɔpruˈɔ	bodopruó
cigarette	kikriˈsi	
fallen fruit	krɔruˈru	
fire	zekrɪrɪrɪĩˈhɔ	inhózêkrêrêrê
boneless meat	kãtẽkiˈu	kãntẽnkiú
water, rain, wind	ĩˈho	
thunder	zekrɪrɪˈrɪ	zêkrêrêrê norô
lightning	naˈrɛ	
shotgun	tiˈpa	tipá
with desire to eat	neˈto	netà
not eating enough	nẽineˈto	
delicious food, I thought it was good	duˈhɛ	duhé
to be sleepless	ibʊˈbʊ	
pooled water, much water	sɔˈdẽ	çõdẽ

=== Métraux (1951) ===
Métraux (1951)'s wordlist, copied from Rodriguez, is reproduced below, with both original French glosses and translated English glosses. Corresponding words are also given in Taruma from Serke (2022).

French gloss (original)	English gloss (translated)	Kariri of Mirandela	Taruma
tête	head	quitipati	ada
cheveux	hair	idiqui-quetipati	aduko
cils	eyelashes	panadô	
oreille	ear	erintucá	asukidjo
dent	tooth	ericofomuqui, uiça (?)	
langue	tongue	buniqui	ninoba
lèvre	lip	biquiri	asuo, asuoba
épaule	shoulder	pufixié	parawa
bras	arm	bunififufa	akwa
main	hand	quifi	ahõ
doigt	finger	comodoi	gwiri 'fingernail'
ventre	belly	mudô	awicha
fesses	buttocks	coquibi	djisu
cuisses	thighs	botiti	akwacha 'hip, thigh'
genou	knee	cofi	orokoda
tibia	tibia	cocudú	
mollet	calf	ila	
chevilles	ankles	popu	
plante du pied	sole	bebaá	
orteil	toe	ticá	
soleil	sun	bozofoxi	wã
lune	moon	boa	biwa
pluie	rain	ifó	hoza
éclair	lightning	irirumaré	
croix-du-sud	Southern Cross	quipapoqui	
étoile	star	detiquimen	hwira
feu	fire	quééfurtitiu	fwa
forêt	forest	sequieifi	nokoda
cerf	deer	prucô	hichika
pécari	peccary	faú	ba'i 'collared peccary'
nandou	rhea	bruan	
cutia	agouti	foifro	hoki
coati	coati	bizaui	kasu
tamanoir	anteater	bizaui	kio
lapin	rabbit	miriú	
serpent	snake	anguiú	bahõ
tatou	armadillo	bozucú	kabayo
renard	fox	jacá	koki
caméléon	chameleon	granharó	
jaguar	jaguar	boiocozzoboingiado	danu
chèvre	goat	pobifi	
chien	dog	gazzorú	hi
poule	chicken	apucá	akara
plantation	plantation	dotitoti	
maïs	maize	paifiquinioré	choka 'corn'
haricot	bean	buzufuxi	
courge	squash	croionho	
manioc	cassava	micu	nito
tapioca	tapioca	quenêoé	
beiju	beiju	beniti	
tabac	tobacco	bozê, labora	soma (from Wapishana soom)
belle personne	beautiful person	dixi	
personne laide	ugly person	boxé	
personne mariée	married person	fofi	
célibataire	celibate person	coni	
vieillard	old person	chibó	
mauvais blanc	mild white	carai-box	hogiku 'white'
bon blanc	bright white	carai-fizou	hogiku 'white'
métis	mixed	carai-naré	kiribi 'mix'
rouge	red	urango-cozzo	hishiku
noir	black	arango-naré	dukwu
vrai noir	deep black	urango-taré	
