= Kiriri =

Kiriri may refer to:

- Kiriri, Kenya
- Kiriri people, an indigenous people of Brazil
- Kiriri, variant of Keriri, Indigenous name for Hammond Island (Queensland)

== Languages ==
- Kiriri languages, or Kariri languages, a group of extinct languages spoken by the Kiriri people
  - Dzubukua, or Kiriri, an extinct language or dialect formerly spoken by the Kiriri people
  - Kipeá language, or Kiriri, another extinct language or dialect formerly spoken by the Kiriri people
- Katembri language, also known as Kiriri, distinct from the Kariri languages
