= War of the Barbarians =

Resistance movement in Brazil

- Part of Indigenous Resistance Against Colonization in Brazil
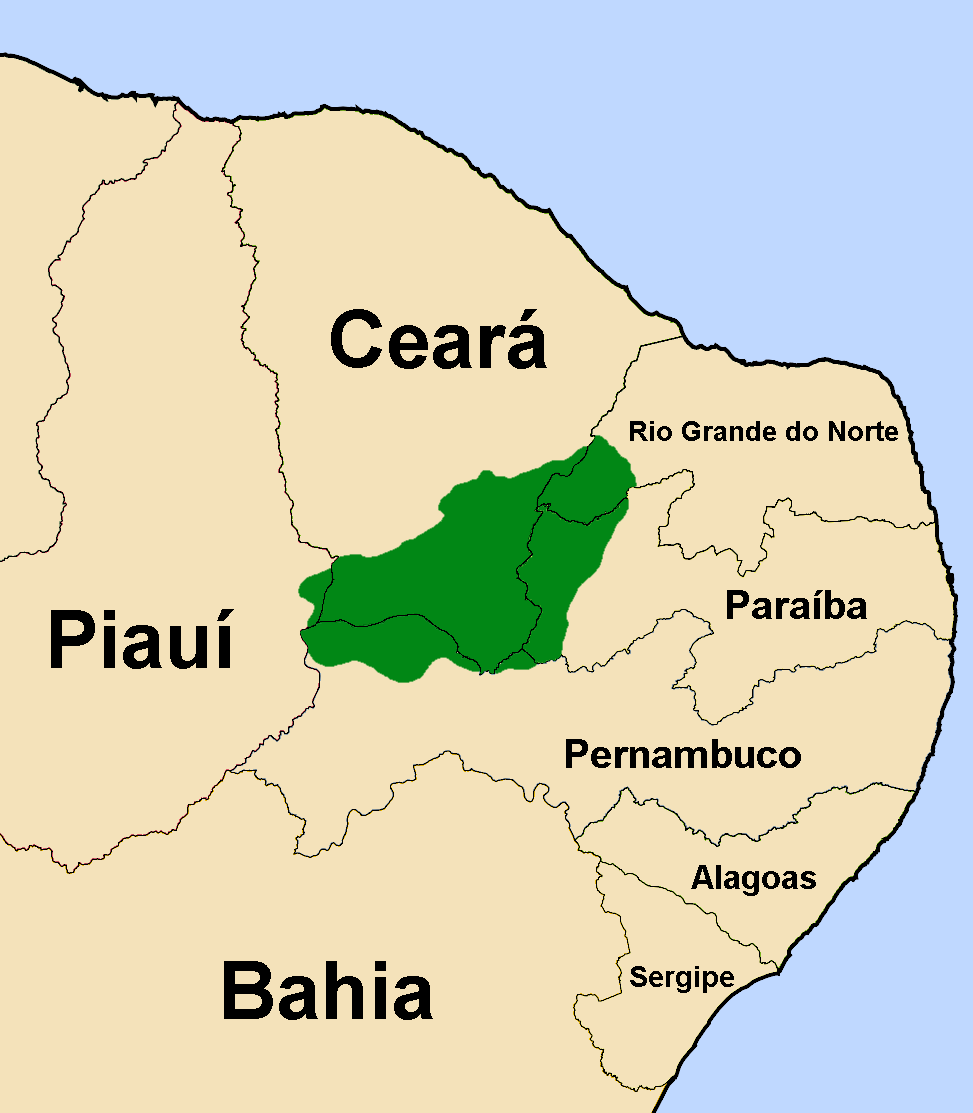
- Location of the confederation's heartland (green) over a map of modern day Brazilian states
Date	1682-1713
Location	Brazil
Result	Portuguese victory

Belligerents
Cariri Confederation	Portugal

Commanders and leaders
Unknown	(Portugal) Manuel Ressurreição (Portugal) João Braga

The War of the Barbarians was a resistance movement of the Cariri and Tarairiú nations against Portuguese colonization in Brazil. It took place between 1682 and 1713, in the Northeastern region of the country, mainly in the states of Rio Grande do Norte, Ceará and Paraíba.

== The Cariris ==
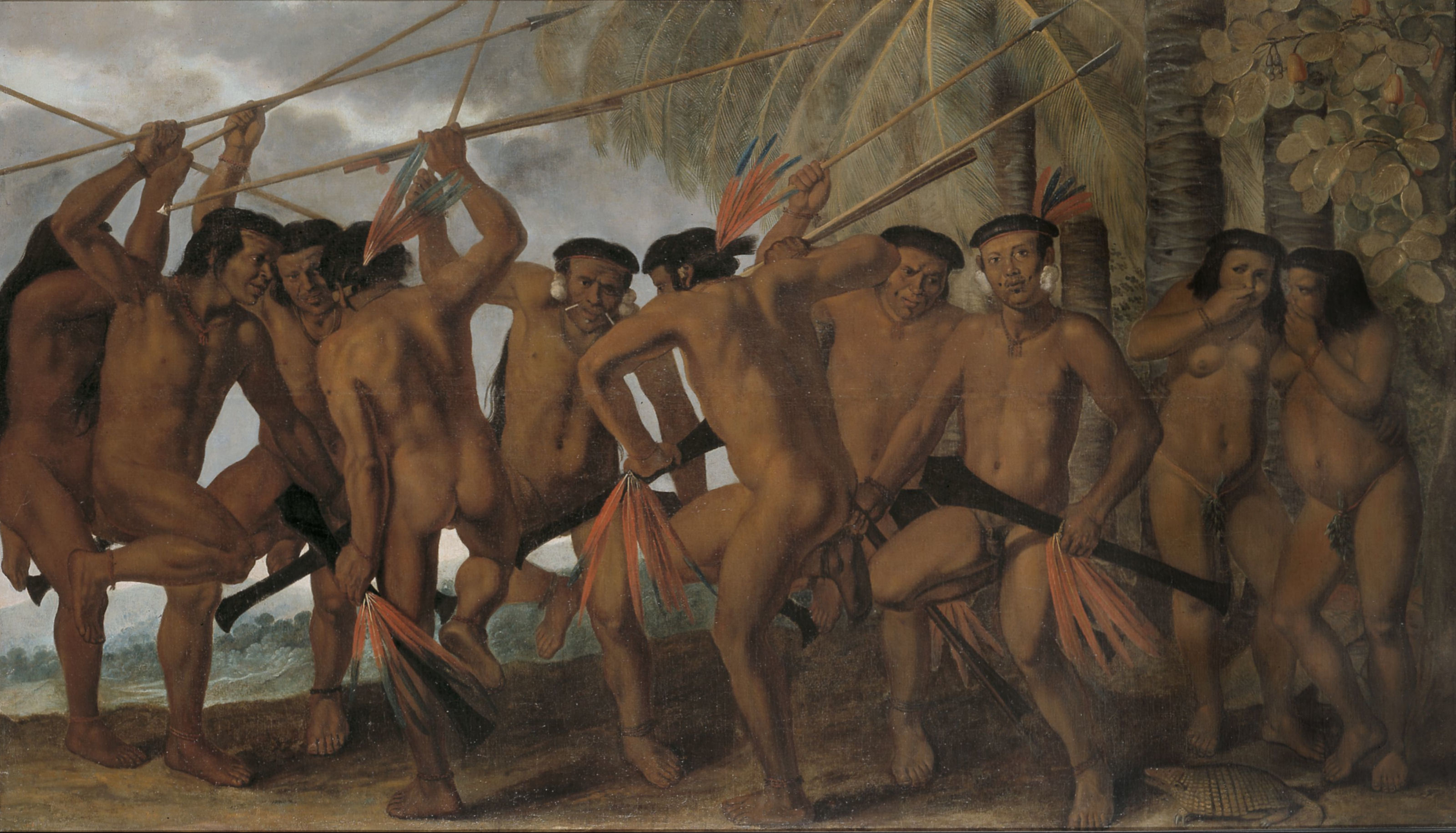
«Dance of the Tapuias», art by the Dutch painter Albert Eckhout.

The Cariri people and the ethnic groups that they encompassed (Inhanmuns, Cariús, Crateús) lived in a vast region across the Brazilian caatinga, from the south of Bahia to the north of Ceará. It is theorized that they migrated from the north in search of more fertile lands, and that their language was independent from all others. They were an agricultural society, and their economic activity was based on the cultivation of cashew and the production of mocororó, a type of alcoholic beverage made from the fruit, similar to wine. According to Capistrano de Abreu, the word kariri means "melancholic, silent, quiet". He described them as a "brave and resilient" people.

== Origins of the Confederation ==
Portuguese colonization and entrenchment in the interior of the country often ended in massacres, enslavement and sexual crimes against the local native population, as well as the usurpation of their lands. The indigenous resistance occurred in many ways, such as escaping missionary villages and Portuguese captivity, defending native settlements from explorers, attacking farms erected by settlers and various forms of suicide, if imprisoned. As the decades went by these resistance efforts became less efficient, as the Portuguese technological superiority and the lack of union among the different tribes and nations against the common enemy meant the colonizers could take their land bit by bit. On the contrary, many natives ended up allying themselves with the stronger Portuguese forces in order to defeat rival tribes.

One of the only times the indigenous population managed to forge alliances with each other against the colonizers resulted in the formation of the Confederation of the Cariris. This was a late action against the encroachment of the powerful sesmeiros, the main figures behind Lisbon's control of its new world colonies.

== The War of the Barbarians ==
The first action of the confederation was a revolt against colonial rule in the Assu region of Rio Grande do Norte; the second was in the village of Bom Sucesso do Piancó, Paraíba; the third took place in multiple settlements across Ceará. The revolts were mostly targeted at villages and farms, often resulting in deaths of the settlers and destruction of their properties. Having heard of the chaos that was taking place in the interior of the provinces, the then governor of Brazil, Manuel da Ressurreição, hired bandeirantes from São Paulo and São Vicente to put an end to the "anarchy".

However, the presence of the Paulistas did not suppress the revolts, on the contrary, it caused other native nations in neighboring regions to join the Cariris, including the Anacés, Jaguaribaras, Acriús, Canindés, Jenipapos, Tremembés and Baiacus, expanding the zone of "anarchy" to the lower Jaguaribe river basin. The village of Aquiraz, then capital of the Ceará captaincy, was attacked, resulting in the death of 200 people, with the remaining population fleeing to the Nossa Senhora da Assunção fortress, on the mouth of the Pajeú river.

After years of fighting, colonel João de Barros Braga formed an ordinanças cavalry force, mostly composed of non-indigenous locals, such as vaqueiros that knew the region's terrain and the natives military tactics. In the year of 1713 he led an expedition through the Jaguaribe valley and the Cariri region, massacring all the natives that his army could, with no distinction between belligerent or peaceful, man or woman, adult of child. The confederation forces, having to fight using bows and arrows against an army equipped with modern European muskets, were easily defeated in battles and their morale quickly plummeted, the prisoners of war were taken to the nearest colonist settlements and distributed based on how useful they would be as slaves. In this manner, violently suppressed by the military, the confederation was dissolved.
