= Kamurú language =

Extinct Karirian language of Brazil

Kamurú
- Pedra Branca, Cayriri
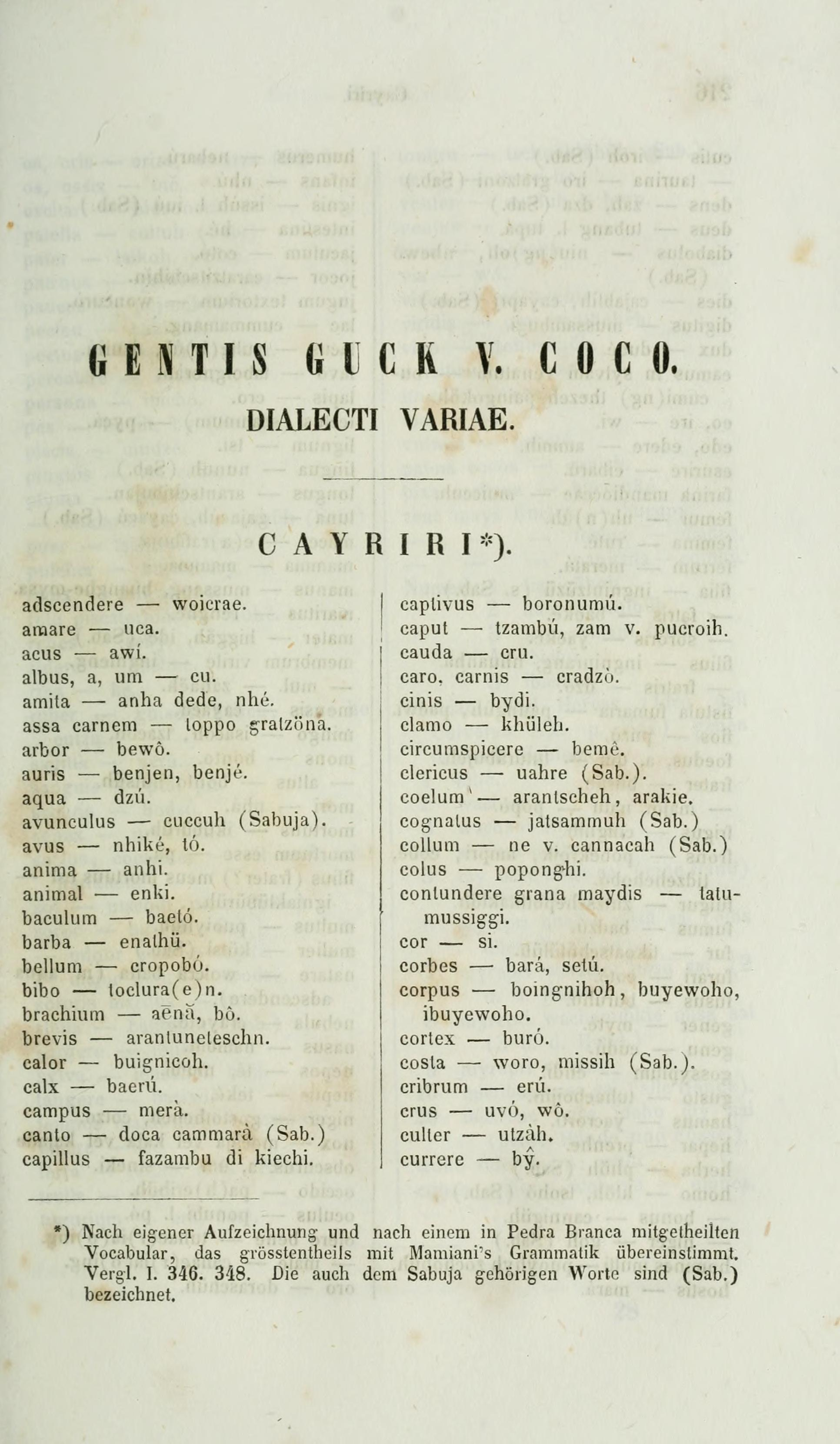
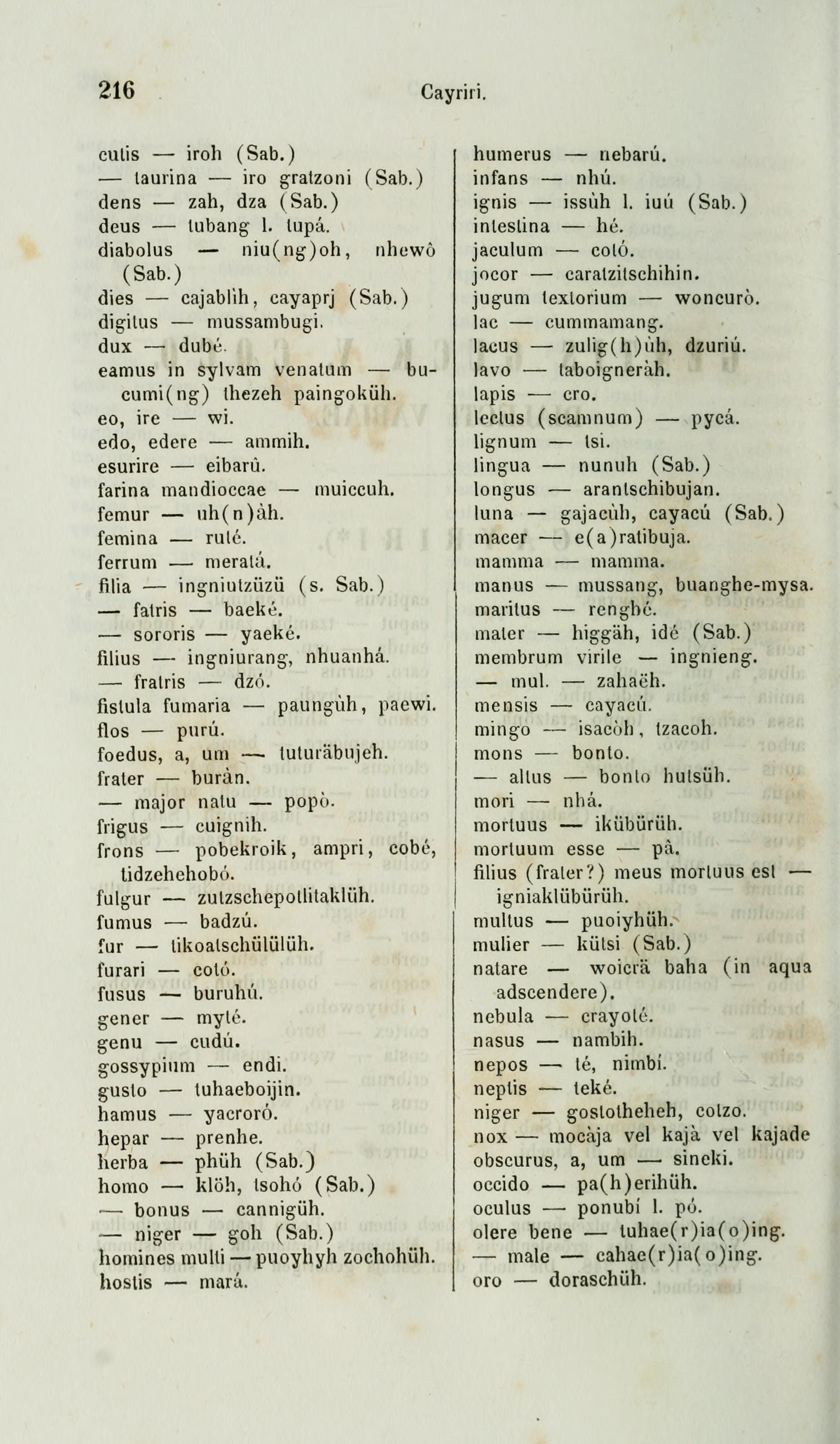
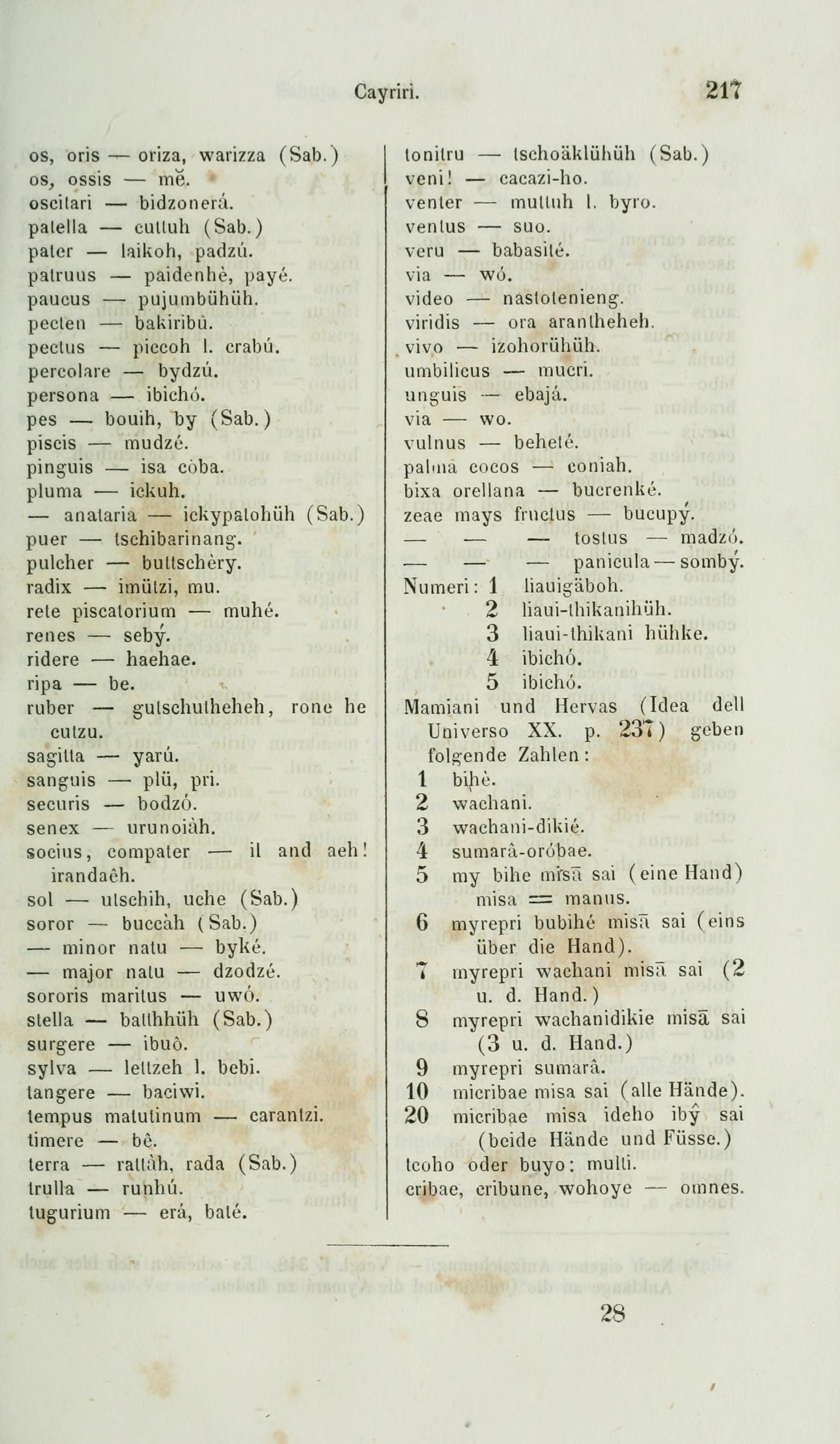
- Martius word list; some of them are actually from Kipeá
- Native to: Brazil
- Region: Bahia
- Ethnicity: Kiriri
- Extinct: by 1891
- Language family: Karirian: Kamurú

Language codes
- ISO 639-3: None (mis)
- Glottolog: kamu1237
- Linguasphere: 89-CBA-ab

Kamurú (Cayriri or Pedra Branca) is an extinct Karirian language of Brazil.

== History ==
Martius visited the Kiriris in 1818, when he collected a word list of Pedra Branca. It is the only known record of it. By 1891, the Kariri of Pedra Branca were found to have disappeared by Paul Ehrenreich. However, a few Kamurú were found surviving in the Caramuru-Paraguaçu Indigenous Territory in 1938 by Curt Nimuendajú.

== Vocabulary ==
Martius word list

- adscendere – woicrae
- amare – uca
- acus – awí
- albus, a, um – cu
- amita – anha dede, nhé
- assa carnem – toppo gratzöna
- arbor – bewô
- auris – benjen, benjé
- aqua – dzú
- avunculus – cuccuh (Sabuja)
- avus – nhiké, tó
- anima – anhi
- animal – enki
- baculum – baetó
- barba – enathü
- bellum – cropobó
- bibo – toclura(e)n
- brachium – aēnă, bô
- brevis – arantuneteschn
- calor – buignicoh
- calx – baerú
- campus – merà
- canto – doca cammarà (Sab.)
- capillus – fazambu di kiechi
- captivus – boronumú
- caput – tzambú, zam v. pucroih
- cauda – cru
- caro, carnis – cradzò
- cinis – bydi
- clamo – khüleh
- circumspicere – bemê
- clericus – uahre (Sab.)
- coelum – arantscheh, arakie
- cognatus – jatsammuh (Sab.)
- collum – ne v. cannacah (Sab.)
- colus – poponghi
- contundere grana maydis – tatumussiggi
- cor – si
- corbes – bará, setú
- corpus – boingnihoh, buyewoho, ibuyewoho
- cortex – buró
- costa – woro, missih (Sab.)
- cribrum – erú
- crus – uvó, wô
- culter – utzàh
- currere – bŷ
- cutis – iroh (Sab.)
- cutis taurina – iro gratzoni (Sab.)
- dens – zah, dza (Sab.)
- deus – tubang l. tupá
- diabolus – niu(ng)oh, nhewô (Sab.)
- dies – cajablìh, cayaprj (Sab.)
- digitus – mussambugi
- dux – dubé
- eamus in sylvam venatum – bucumi(ng) thezeh paingoküh
- eo, ire – wi
- edo, edere – ammih
- esurire – eibarû
- farina mandioccae – muiccuh
- femur – uh(n)àh
- femina – ruté
- ferrum – meratá
- filia – ingniutzüzü (s. Sab.)
- filia fatris – baeké
- filia sororis – yaeké
- filius – ingniurang, nhuanhá
- filius fratris – dzó
- fistula fumaria – paungùh, paewi
- flos – purú
- foedus, a, um – tuturäbujeh
- frater – buràn
- frater major natu – popò
- frigus – cuignih
- frons – pobekroik, ampri, cobé, tidzehehobó
- fulgur – zutzschepotlitaklüh
- fumus – badzú
- fur – tikoatschülülüh
- furari – cotó
- fusus – buruhú
- gener – myté
- genu – cudú
- gossypium – endi
- gusto – tuhaeboijin
- hamus – yacroró
- hepar – prenhe
- herba – phüh (Sab.)
- homo – klöh, tsohó (Sab.)
- homo bonus – cannigüh
- homo niger – goh (Sab.)
- homines multi – puoyhyh zochohüh
- hostis – mará
- humerus – nebarú
- infans – nhú
- ignis – issùh l. iuú (Sab.)
- intestina – hé
- jaculum – cotó
- jocor – caratzitschihin
- jugum textorium – woncurò
- lac – cummamang
- lacus – zulig(h)ùh, dzuriú
- lavo – taboigneràh
- lapis – cro
- lectus (scamnum) – pycá
- lignum – tsi
- lingua – nunuh (Sab.)
- longus – arantschibujan
- luna – gajacùh, cayacú (Sab.)
- macer – e(a)ratibuja
- mamma – mamma
- manus – mussang, buanghe-mysa
- maritus – renghé
- mater – higgäh, idé (Sab.)
- membrum virile – ingnieng
- membrum mul – zahaëh
- mensis – cayacú
- mingo – isacòh, tzacoh
- mons – bonto
- mons altus – bonto hutsüh
- mori – nhá
- mortuus – ikübürüh
- mortuum esse – pâ
- filius (frater?) meus mortuus est – igniaklübürüh
- multus – puoiyhüh
- mulier – kütsi (Sab.)
- natare – woicrä baha (in aqua adscendere)
- nebula – crayoté
- nasus – nambih
- nepos – té, nimbí
- neptis – teké
- niger – gostotheheh, cotzo
- nox – mocàja vel kajà vel kajade
- obscurus, a, um – sineki
- occido – pa(h)erihüh
- oculus – ponubí l. pó
- olere bene – tuhae(r)ia(o)ing
- olere male – cahae(r)ia(o)ing
- oro – doraschüh
- os, oris – oriza, warizza (Sab.)
- os, ossis – mĕ
- oscitari – bidzonerá
- patella – cuttuh (Sab.)
- pater – laikoh, padzú
- patruus – paidenhè, payé
- paucus – pujumbühüh
- pecten – bakiribû
- pectus – piccoh l. crabú
- percolare – bydzú
- persona – ibichó
- pes – bouih, by (Sab.)
- piscis – mudzé
- pinguis – isa còba
- pluma – ickuh
- pluma anataria – ickypatohüh (Sab.)
- puer – tschibarinang
- pulcher – buttschèry
- radix – imützi, mu
- rete piscatorium – muhé
- renes – sebý
- ridere – haehae
- ripa – be
- ruber – gutschutheheh, rone he cutzu
- sagitta – yarú
- sanguis – plü, pri
- securis – bodzó
- senex – urunoiàh
- socius, compater – il and aeh! irandaêh
- sol – utschih, uche (Sab.)
- soror – buccàh (Sab.)
- soror minor natu – byké
- soror major natu – dzodzé
- sororis maritus – uwó
- stella – batthhüh (Sab.)
- surgere – ibuô
- sylva – lettzeh l. bebi
- tangere – baciwi
- tempus matutinum – carantzi
- timere – bê
- terra – rattàh, rada (Sab.)
- trulla – runhú
- tugurium – erá, baté
- tonitru – tschoäklühüh (Sab.)
- veni! – cacazi-ho
- venter – muttuh l. byro
- ventus – suo
- veru – babasité
- via – wó
- video – nastotenieng
- viridis – ora arantheheh
- vivo – izohorühüh
- umbilicus – mucri
- unguis – ebajá
- via – wo
- vulnus – beheté
- palma cocos – coniah
- bixa orellana – bucrenké
- zeae mays fructus – bucupý
- zeae mays fructus tostus – madzó
- zeae mays fructus panicula – sombý
- 1 liauigäboh
- 2 liaui-thikanihüh
- 3 liaui-thikani hühke
- 4 ibichó
- 5 ibichó

== Bibliography ==
- Adam, Lucien (1897). Matériaux pour servir à l'établissement d'une grammaire comparée des dialectes de la famille Kariri [Materials to serve for the establishment of a comparative grammar of the dialects of the Kariri family] (in French). Paris: Maisonneuve. Archived from the original on 21 May 2025.
- Azevedo, Gilda Maria Corrêa de (1965). Língua Kiriri: descrição do dialeto Kipeá [Kiriri language: description of the Kipeá dialect] (in Portuguese). Brasília: Universidade de Brasília. Archived from the original on 16 July 2025.
- Rodrigues, Arion Dall'Igna (1948). "Nota sôbre o sistema de parentesco dos índios Kiriri" [Note on the kinship system of the Kiriri Indians]. Revista do Museu Paulista. Nova Série (in Portuguese). 2. São Paulo. Archived from the original on 12 July 2025.
- Martius, Carl Friedr. Phil. von (1863). Beiträge zur Ethnographie und Sprachenkunde Brasiliens [Contributions to the ethnography and linguistics of Brazil ] (in German). Vol. 2. Erlangen: Druck von Junge & Sohn. Archived from the original on 17 June 2024.
