= Quixelô people =

Quixelô
Regions with significant populations
- Brazil (Iguatu, Ceará)

Languages
- Kariri (formerly)

The Quixelô people (Kariri-Kixelô, Quixelô-Kariri) are an Indigenous people of Brazil, currently living in the municipality of Iguatu, Ceará. Formerly, they spoke the isolated Kariri language, which was suppressed by colonizers and later went extinct. In the 18th century, they fought in the War of the Barbarians against Portuguese colonization, but were nearly driven to extinction.

== Name ==
The name "Quixelô" means 'place where ceramics are made'. The municipality of Quixelô is named after them.

== History ==
Beginning around 1700, the Quixelô fought alongside other Indigenous peoples in the region in the War of the Barbarians, a resistance movement against colonizers. In the 18th century, they were nearly exterminated by colonizers. In 1863, all Indigenous peoples in Ceará, including the Quixelô, were formally declared extinct. This enabled their lands to be taken from them much easier.

== Location ==
Presently, the Quixelô inhabit the municipalities of Iguatu, Quixelô, and Acopiara in Ceará, as well as in other cities in Brazil.

== Language ==
The Quixelô spoke the Kariri language, a now-extinct language isolate. Use of the Kariri language, as well as other Indigenous languages, was suppressed by the Marquis of Pombal in 1758.
