= A. poeppigii =

A. poeppigii may refer to:

- Aechmea poeppigii, a plant native to the West Indies, Costa Rica, Panama, and northern South America
- Angadenia poeppigii, a plant native to the Americas
