= Sabujá language =

Extinct Karirian language of Brazil

Sabujá
- Sapuyá
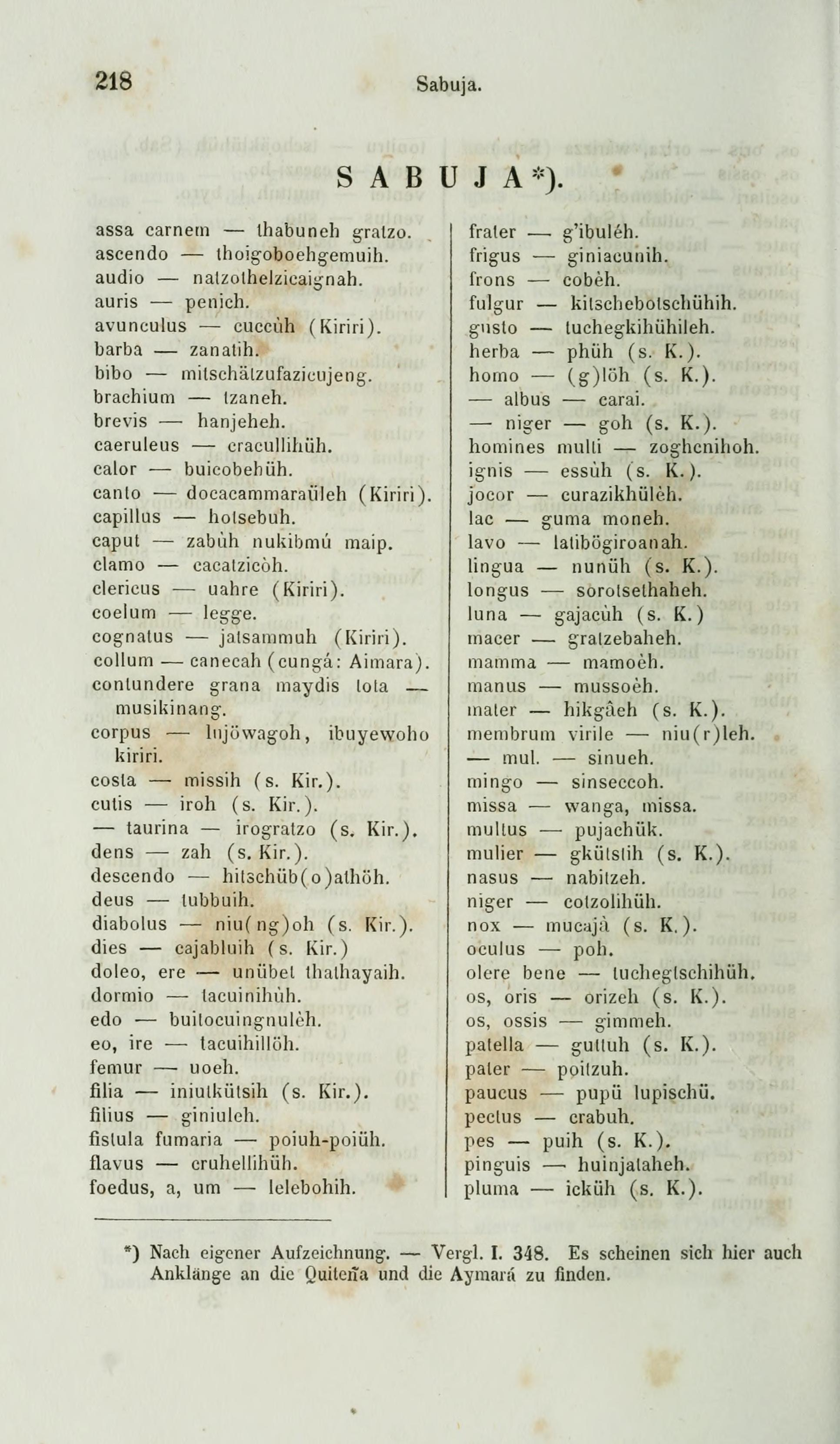
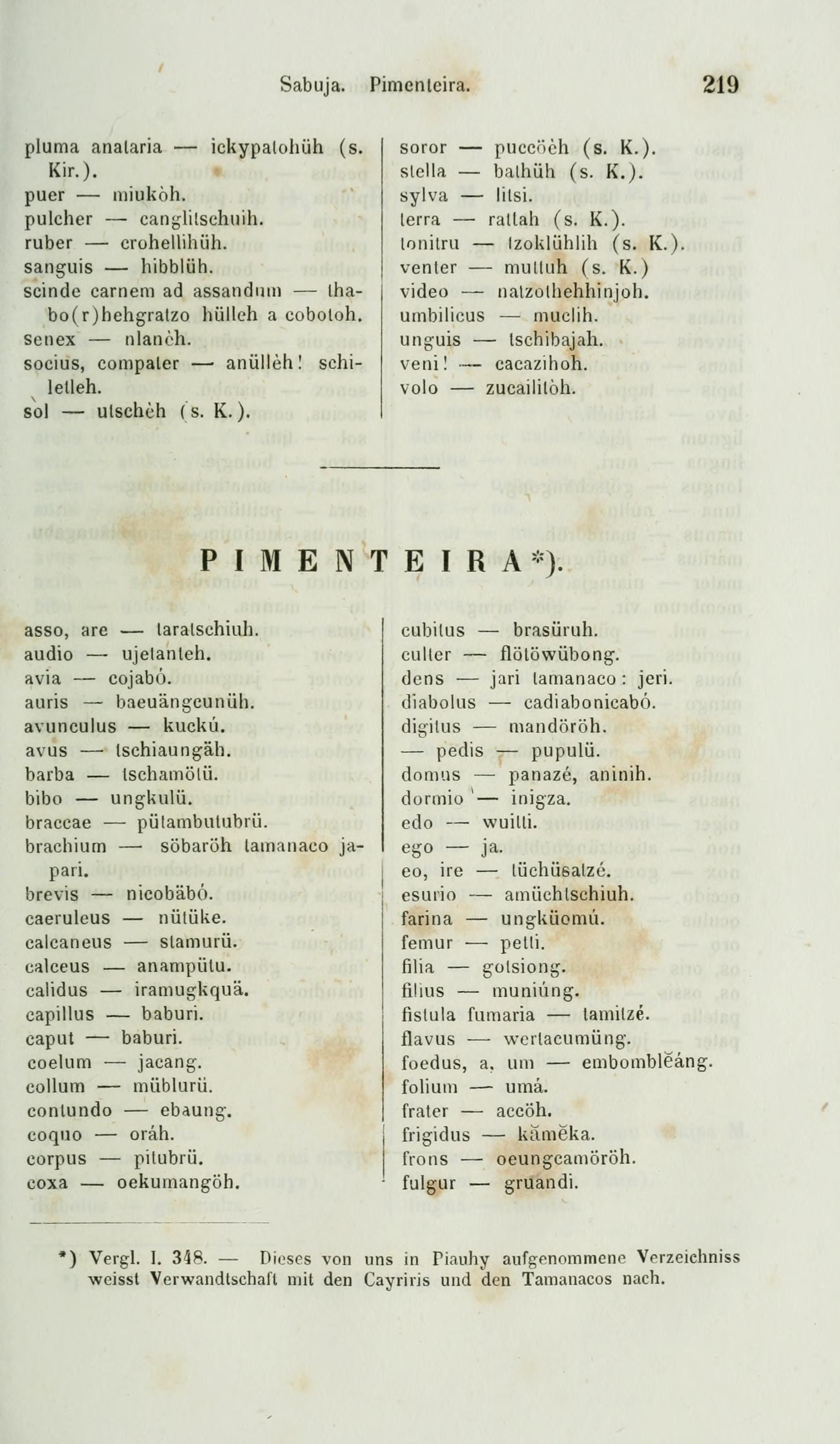
- Martius word list
- Native to: Brazil
- Region: northeastern Bahia
- Ethnicity: Kiriri (Kiriri-Sapuyá)
- Extinct: by 1891
- Language family: Karirian: Sabujá

Language codes
- ISO 639-3: None (mis)
- Glottolog: sabu1246
- Linguasphere: 89-CBA-ad

Sabujá (Sapuyá) is an extinct Karirian language of northeastern Bahia, Brazil.

== History ==
Martius visited the Kiriris in 1818, when he collected a word list of Sabujá. It is the only known record of it. By 1891, the Sabujá were found to have disappeared by Paul Ehrenreich.

== Vocabulary ==
Martius word list

- assa carnem – thabuneh gratzo.
- ascendo – thoigoboehgemuih.
- audio – natzothelzicaignah.
- auris – penich.
- avunculus – cuccùh (Kiriri).
- barba – zanatih.
- bibo – mitschätzufazicujeng.
- brachium – tzaneh.
- brevis – hanjeheh.
- caeruleus – cracullihüh.
- calor – buicobehüh.
- canto – docacammaraüleh (Kiriri).
- capillus – hotsebuh.
- caput – zabùh nukibmú maip.
- clamo – cacatzicòh.
- clericus – uahre (Kiriri).
- coelum – legge.
- cognatus – jatsammuh (Kiriri).
- collum – canecah (cungá: Aimara).
- contundere grana maydis tota – musikinang.
- corpus – lujöwagoh, ibuyewoho kiriri.
- costa – missih (s. Kir.).
- cutis – iroh (s. Kir.).
- cutis taurina – irogratzo (s. Kir.).
- dens – zah (s. Kir.).
- descendo – hitschüb(o)athöh.
- deus – tubbuih.
- diabolus – niu(ng)oh (s. Kir.).
- dies – cajabluih (s. Kir.)
- doleo, ere – unübet thathayaih.
- dormio – tacuinihùh.
- edo – buitocuingnulèh.
- eo, ire – tacuihillöh.
- femur – uoeh.
- filia – iniutkütsih (s. Kir.).
- filius – giniuleh.
- fistula fumaria – poiuh-poiüh.
- flavus – cruhellihüh.
- foedus, a, um – lelebohih.
- frater – g'ibuléh.
- frigus – giniacunih.
- frons – cobèh.
- fulgur – kitschebotschühih.
- gusto – tuchegkihühileh.
- herba – phüh (s. K.).
- homo – (g)löh (s. K.).
- homo albus – carai.
- homo niger – goh (s. K.).
- homines multi – zoghenihoh.
- ignis – essùh (s. K.).
- jocor – curazikhülèh.
- lac – guma moneh.
- lavo – latibögiroanah.
- lingua – nunüh (s. K.).
- longus – sorotsethaheh.
- luna – gajacùh (s. K.)
- macer – gratzebaheh.
- mamma – mamoèh.
- manus – mussoèh.
- mater – hikgâeh (s. K.).
- membrum virile – niu(r)leh.
- membrum mul. – sinueh.
- mingo – sinseccoh.
- missa – wanga, missa.
- multus – pujachük.
- mulier – gkütstih (s. K.).
- nasus – nabitzeh.
- niger – cotzolihüh.
- nox – mucajà (s. K.).
- oculus – poh.
- olere bene – tuchegtschihüh.
- os, oris – orizeh (s. K.).
- os, ossis – gimmeh.
- patella – guttuh (s. K.).
- pater – poitzuh.
- paucus – pupü lupischü.
- pectus – crabuh.
- pes – puih (s. K.).
- pinguis – huinjataheh.
- pluma – icküh (s. K.).
- pluma anataria – ickypatohüh (s. Kir.).
- puer – miukòh.
- pulcher – canglitschuih.
- ruber – crohellihüh.
- sanguis – hibblüh.
- scinde carnem ad assandum – thabo(r)hehgratzo hülleh a cobotoh.
- senex – nlanèh.
- socius, compater – anüllèh! schiletleh.
- sol – utschèh (s. K.).
- soror – puccöèh (s. K.).
- stella – bathüh (s. K.).
- sylva – litsi.
- terra – rattah (s. K.).
- tonitru – tzoklühlih (s. K.).
- venter – muttuh (s. K.)
- video – natzothehhinjoh.
- umbilicus – muclih.
- unguis – tschibajah.
- veni! – cacazihoh.
- volo – zucailitòh.

== Bibliography ==
- Adam, Lucien (1897). Matériaux pour servir à l'établissement d'une grammaire comparée des dialectes de la famille Kariri [Materials to serve for the establishment of a comparative grammar of the dialects of the Kariri family] (in French). Paris: Maisonneuve. Archived from the original on 21 May 2025.
- Azevedo, Gilda Maria Corrêa de (1965). Língua Kiriri: descrição do dialeto Kipeá [Kiriri language: description of the Kipeá dialect] (in Portuguese). Brasília: Universidade de Brasília. Archived from the original on 16 July 2025.
- Martius, Carl Friedr. Phil. von (1863). Beiträge zur Ethnographie und Sprachenkunde Brasiliens [Contributions to the ethnography and linguistics of Brazil ] (in German). Vol. 2. Erlangen: Druck von Junge & Sohn. Archived from the original on 17 June 2024.
