= W. poeppigii =

W. poeppigii may refer to:

- Wettinia poeppigii, a monoecious palm
- Wittmackia poeppigii, a plant native to the West Indies, Costa Rica, Panama, and northern South America
