= Soure =

Soure may refer to the following places:

- Soure, Pará, a municipality in the State of Pará, Brazil
- Soure, Portugal, a municipality in the district of Coimbra, Portugal

== See also ==
- Nova Soure, a municipality in the State of Bahia, Brazil
