= Abaiara =

Municipality in Ceará, Brazil

- Municipality
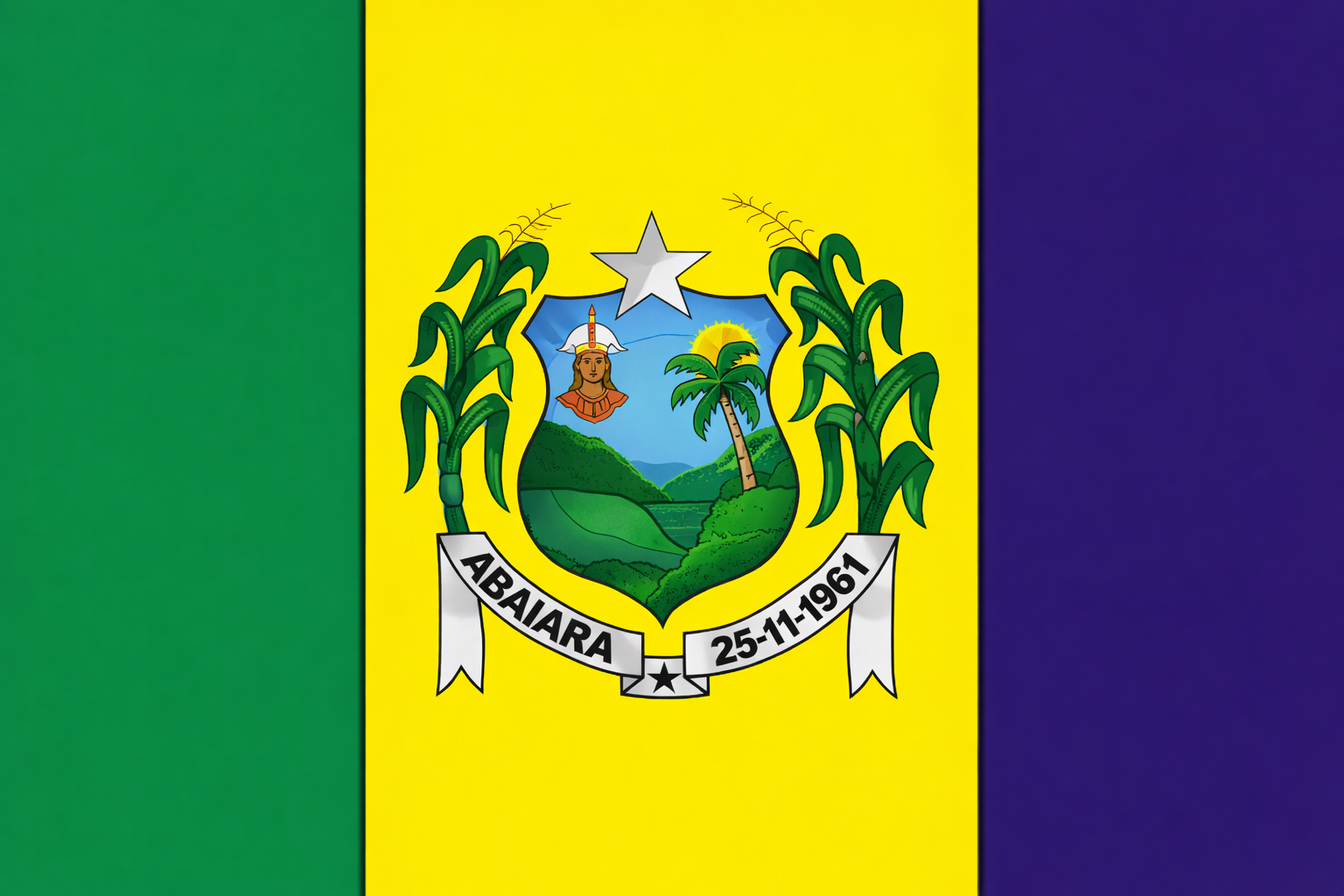
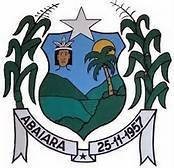
- Flag Coat of arms

- Location in Brazil
- Coordinates: 7°21′S 39°3′W
- Country: Brazil
- Region: Northeast
- State: Ceará

Area
  - Total: 178.8 km^{2} (69.0 sq mi)

Population (2020)
  - Total: 11,853
  - Density: 66.29/km^{2} (171.7/sq mi)
- Time zone: UTC−3 (BRT)

Abaiara is a city in the region of the Kiriri people, in the state of Ceará, Brazil. The population in 2020 was 11,853 people.

== Etymology ==
The city was first named, in 1873, "Distrito de São Pedro", as a tribute to the Brazilian emperor Pedro II. In 1938 the name was changed to "Pedro Segundo". In 1943 the city received its current name, "Abaiara", this name in Tupi means "the lord of men", through the combination of abá ("man") and îara ("lord") (still as a reference and tribute to Pedro II).

== History ==
The first inhabitants of the region were the indigenous Kariri, of Tapuia origin. They were a strong and warlike people who became notable in colonial history for their resistance to the advance of the Portuguese.

The lands located at the foothills of the Chapada do Araripe were inhabited by the Kariri Gauariú.

Abaiara, as an urban nucleus, emerged in the 19th century, when two farmers, José Leite da Cunha and José Júlio Sampaio, settled in the area with cattle ranches.

== Political evolution ==
The first political event occurred just after the creation of the Distrito da Paz on March 27, 1873. Abaiara was first elevated to the condition of Vila on December 20, 1938, under the name of Pedro Segundo. The name was not very popular with the inhabitants and was soon replaced with the current name on December 30, 1943. Abaiara was elevated to the status of municipality on March 25, 1957.

== Religion ==
The first non-indigenous religious event took place when Father José Antônio de Araújo erected the first church which later became the central point in the city. With the growth of the city and the natural degradation of the first church, it became obvious that a new church was necessary. This second was built next to the first one (to avoid hurting the feelings of the population). The second church was dedicated to the Immaculate Heart of Mary and was made possible due to the actions of José Júlio Sampaio. However, the official saint remained Sacred Heart of Jesus.

== Geography ==
=== Climate ===
The climate is tropical hot semi-arid with relatively high rainfall of 1,256 millimetres, with precipitation concentrated between January and April. Average temperatures range between 24 and 26 °C.

=== Hydrography and water resources ===
The main water sources are the Rompe Gibão stream and the Sabonete, São Pedro, and Jitirama streams.

=== Relief and soils ===
The main elevations are the São Felipe Mountains, the Mãozinha Mountains, and the Araripe Mountains.

=== Vegetation ===
Most of the territory is covered by thorny deciduous forest (caatinga woodland), while higher areas in the southwestern part of the municipality contain tropical semi-deciduous rainforest (dry forest).

== Economy ==
The economy of the municipality of Abaiara is based on family farming, agriculture, livestock farming, and local commerce.
