= Luva de Pedreiro =

Brazilian internet personality (born 2001)

- Born: Iran de Santana Alves; November 7, 2001 (age 24); Quijingue, Bahia, Brazil
- Other name: Iran Ferreira
- Occupations: YouTuber; internet personality; Footballer
- Children: 1

YouTube information
- Channel: Luva de Pedreiro
- Years active: 2021–present
- Genre: Association football
- Subscribers: 2,25 million
- Views: 216 million
- Last updated: July 24, 2026
- Website: www.luvadepedreiro.com.br

Iran de Santana Alves (born November 7, 2001), better known as Luva de Pedreiro (lit. 'mason's glove') and sometimes called Iran Ferreira, is a Brazilian internet personality and YouTuber. In 2022, he broke records in virtual content focused on football in the Americas and became the Brazilian influencer of the sport with the most followers on Instagram.

Initially stereotyped as a meme, he achieved success in Brazil and abroad by publishing amateur football videos on his social networks, where he demonstrates his skills in the sport by making references to famous teams and players, celebrating his goals using catchphrases such as "Receba!" (Receive!) and "Obrigado, meu Deus" (Thank you, God") which quickly began to be reproduced by several internet users and world celebrities from football and other sports.

His nickname came from playing football using construction professionals' gloves, referencing the cold-weather gloves used by European players.

== Early life ==
Iran de Santana Alves was born in the village of Tábua, in Quijingue, a city with less than 30 thousand inhabitants in the interior of Bahia. Of humble origins, he used to play as a child with cloth balls made by his mother or with coconuts he found in the backyard, where he started playing association football and fell in love with the sport, becoming a Vasco da Gama fan thanks to his family's encouragement. Despite his desire to become a professional player, he ended up putting his dream aside to help his father work on the farm as a boy. Due to everyday situations, he could attend school until the eighth year of elementary school.

== Influencer career ==
=== 2021: The Beginning ===
In 2021, at the age of 20, he started recording his own videos, as he wanted to watch himself on his cell phone. Later, with the help of friends and neighbors, he started recording videos more frequently. That same year, his videos became successful on the internet, but it was at the beginning of the following year that they began to be recognized nationally and internationally, with this Iran began to reconcile his work routine in the field with the production of virtual content with the aim of ensure a source of income for his family.

=== 2022–present: Fame, son and football-based content ===
In 2022, during a participation in the TV program, Encontro com Fátima Bernardes, Iran revealed his intention to become a football coach in the following years. In September 2023, Iran announced that he would be a father, drawing attention to the name of his future son, which, according to the influencer, would be called "Cristiano Ronaldo Jr." Later, in an interview with the Podpah podcast, he explained that the child's full name would be "Cristiano Ronaldo da Gama Laurino Santana", mixing the names of the player of the same name and the Vasco da Gama sports team. On March 7, 2024, his firstborn, Davi Cristiano Ronaldo Gomes de Santana Alves, was born. The first child is the result of his relationship with biologist Távila Gomes. On September 24, 2026, he was named a brand ambassador for SPRIBE's online game Aviator, with a role promoting the game to audiences in Brazil and Latin America.

== Football career ==
In 2023, Iran was signed by Grêmio's "futebol 7" team. Upon joining "Tricolor Gaucho" (Grêmio), he soon provoked rivalry and arguments between Grêmio and Internacional. In a video published on Instagram, when asked if he was being sought by "Colorado" (Internacional), Iran replied that he “only plays for a big team”.

== See also ==
- Football in Brazil
