= Fort São João Baptista (Vila do Conde) =

- Forte de São João Baptista
- Vila do Conde, Portugal
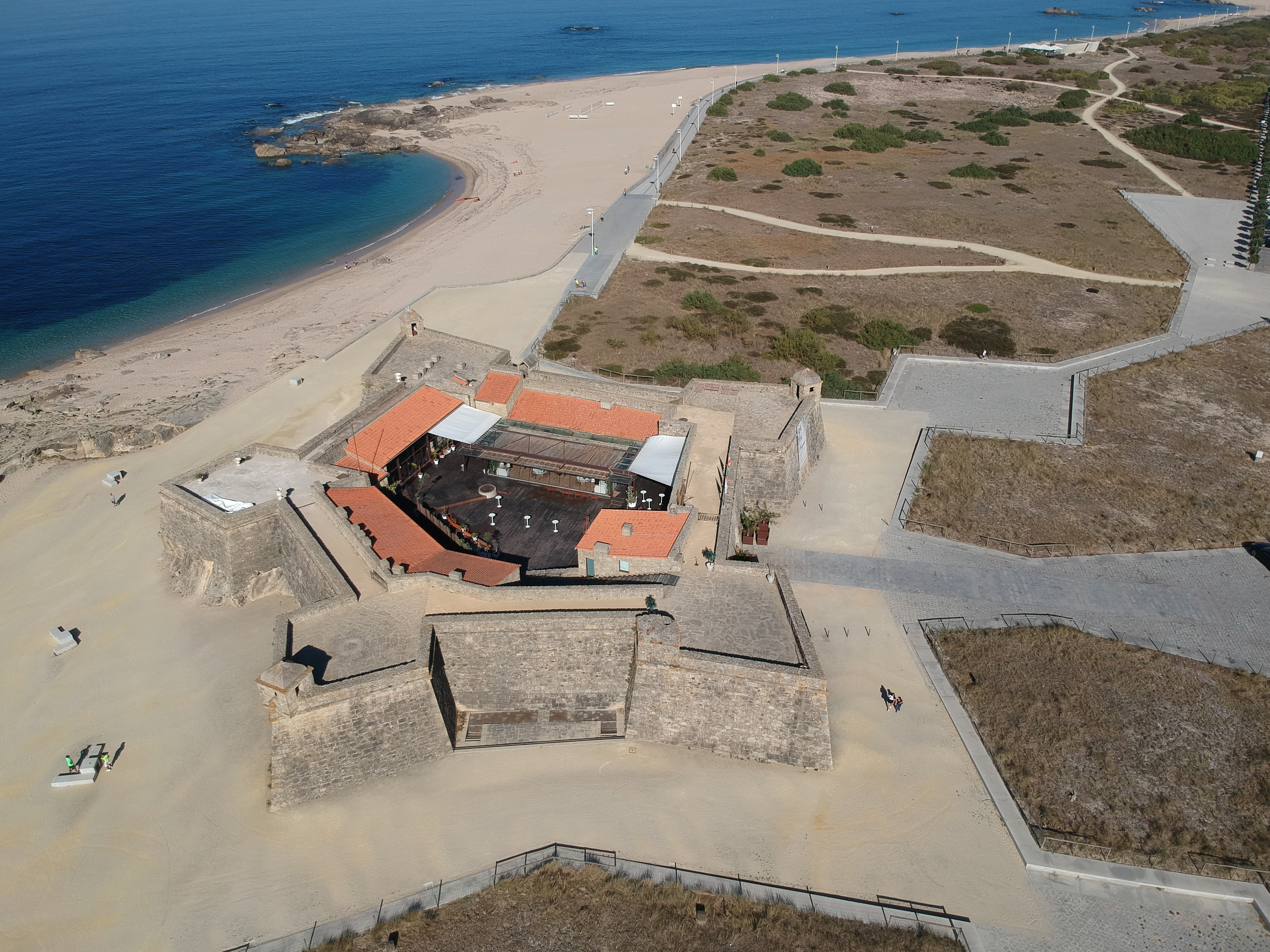
- Aerial photograph of the Fort São João Baptista

Site information
- Type: Bastion fort

Location
- Coordinates: 41°20′30″N 8°45′06″W

Site history
- Built: 1570-1641
- In use: 17th-19th century.

Fort São João Baptista (Forte de São João Baptista in Portuguese), also known as Fort of Nossa Senhora da Assunção (Forte da Nossa Senhora da Assunção in Portuguese), is located at the mouth of the river Ave, in the town of Vila do Conde, district of Porto, in Portugal.

It is currently in good condition and open for visitors.

== History ==
Initially named Nossa Senhora da Assunção, it has long been known by the name São João Baptista.

Construction of the fort commenced in the 1570s, by order of the Constable of Portugal and lord of Vila do Conde, the Duke of Guimarães Dom Duarte, and were directed by Filipe Terzi. Its main role was to defend the rivermouth and the town from pirate attacks. The fort was completed on 28 January 1641 and its first commander was Manuel Gaio Carneiro. The fort was renovated in 1796. After the Portuguese Civil War, the fort lost its military purpose and its garrison was removed.

Almost abandoned in the 20th century, it was requalified from 1982 to 1998 as a hotel unit (with 8 rooms), with a project by the architects Paulo Lobo and Amadeo Mandolesi, and resources from the Tourism Fund and the municipality.

It opened its doors as a hotel in 1999. The concession's object was short-lived, however, as a few years later, it became an open-air nightclub, open only in the summer. The concession, renewed up to the limit, ended in May 2020.

In February 2020, the Chamber opened a new competition, which would be canceled, as the winning proposal (Eskada group) intended to continue with the disco.

In February 2021, a new contest was launched. The idea is that the Fort will once again become a hotel, restaurant and beverage establishment. The property must allow visits to the public, host events involving local associations/institutions and be open all year round. The public tender for the concession of the fort for a period of 15 years has a base price of 2.04 million euros.

It has been classified as a Property of Public Interest since October 6, 1967.

== Features ==
The structure has a pentagon shape with pentagon bastions at the edges, in the Vauban style. The walls are made of sloped stone, topped by vertical parapets. In three of the five bastions, watchtowers have a quadrangular plan.

The bastions are named: Santo António, Santa Bárbara, São Francisco, São João and Nossa Senhora da Guia.

Around the square of weapons, under the shelter of the walls, are distributed the service buildings: Command quarters, barracks, magazine and warehouse. There is a cistern in the center of the courtyard. At the edges of the courtyard are located the ramps that allowed the artillery to be brought up to the bastions.

== Gallery ==
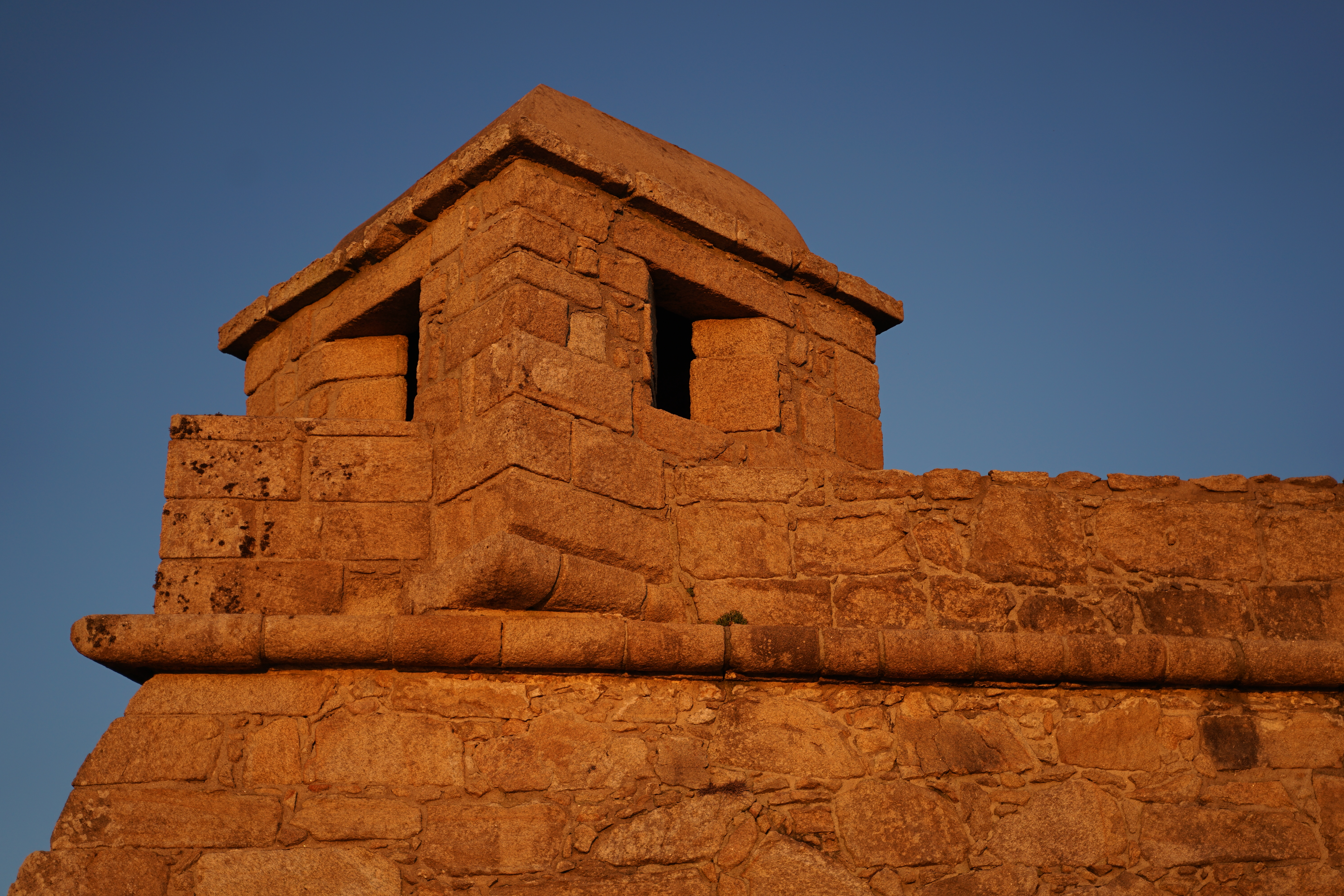
Sentry box

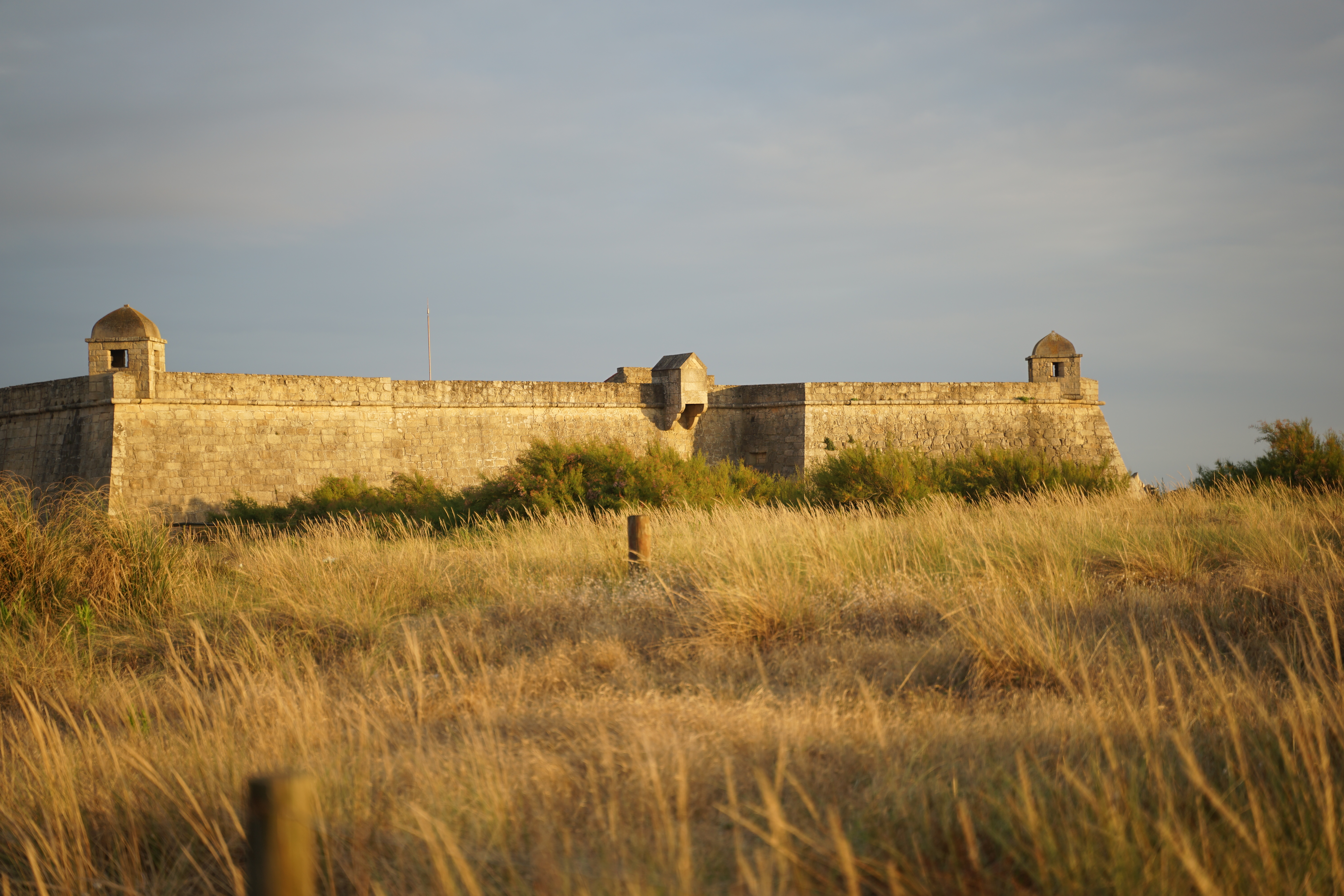
Far view

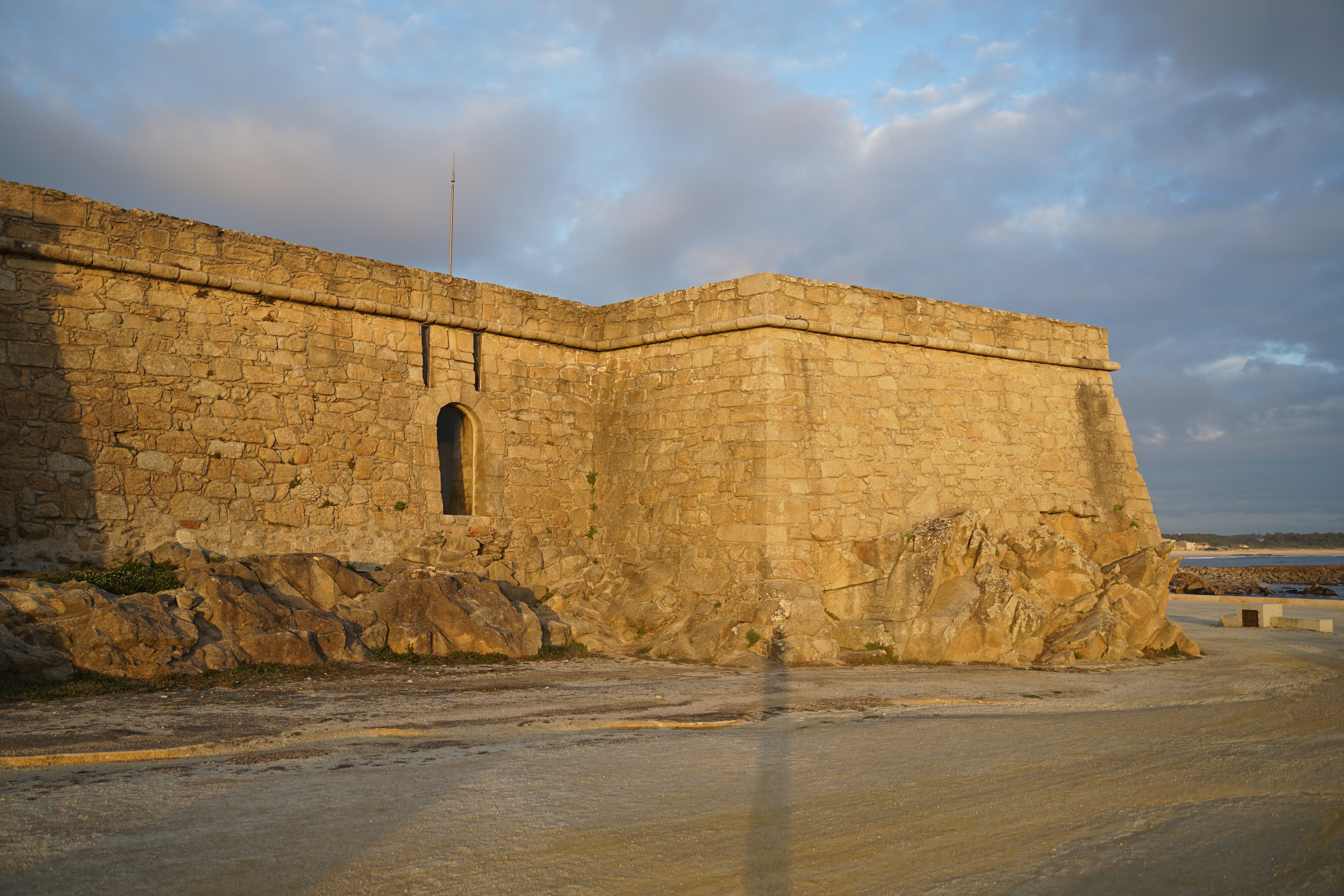
Gate

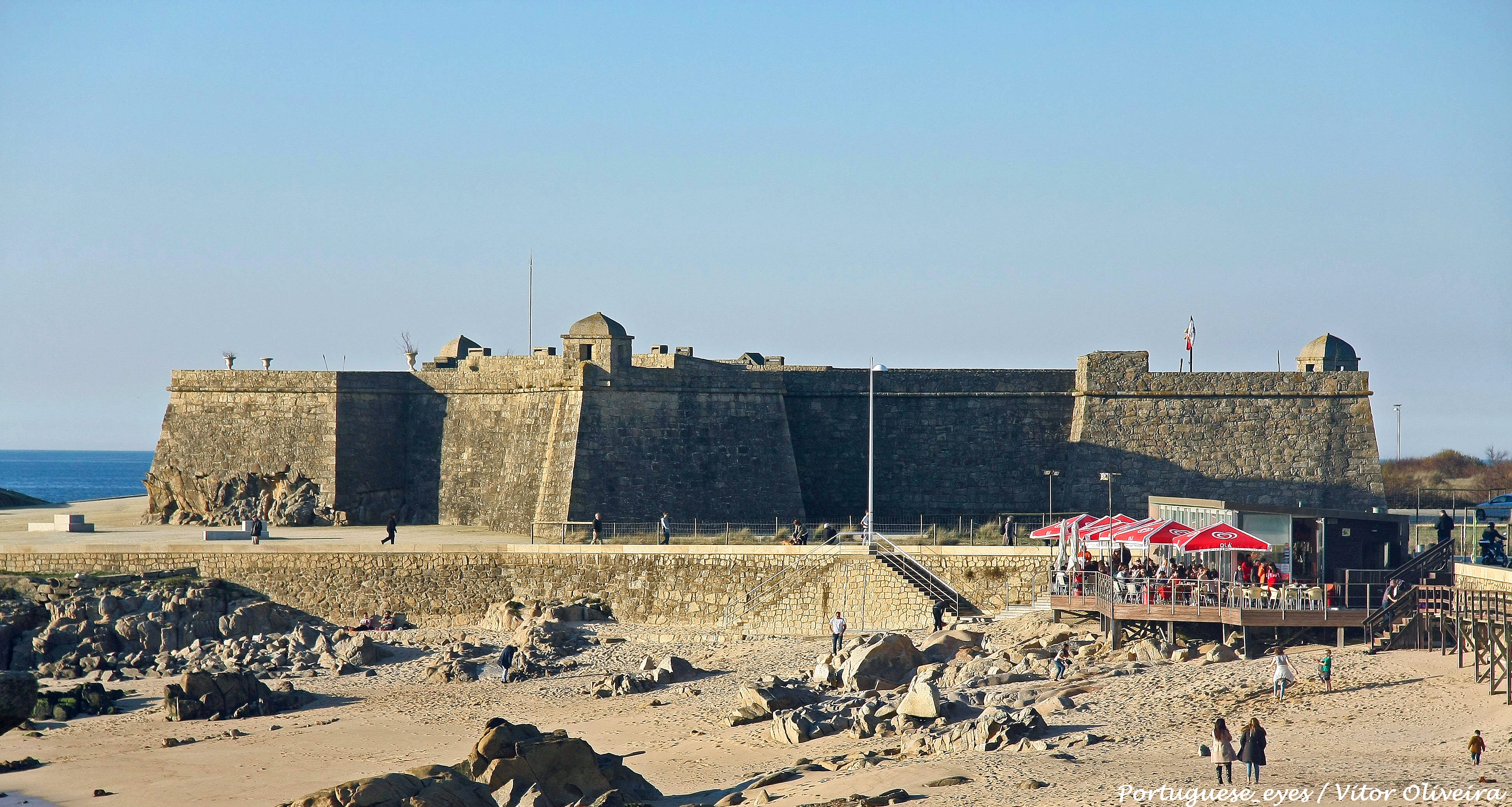
View from the city.
