= Banzaê =

Municipality of Bahia, Brazil

- Municipality
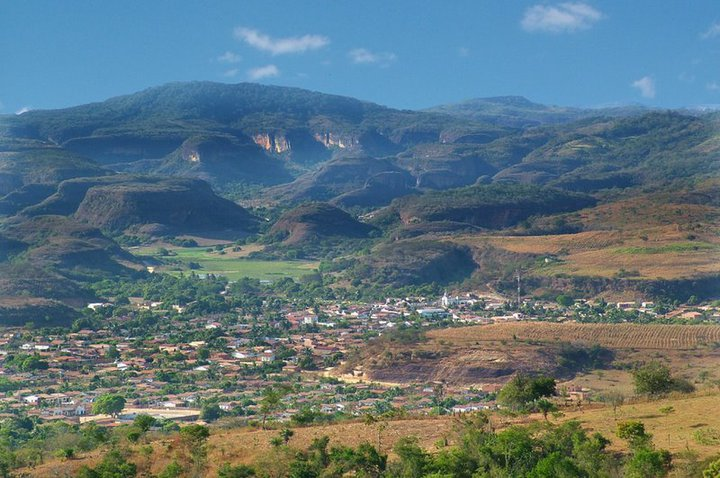
- View of Banzaê

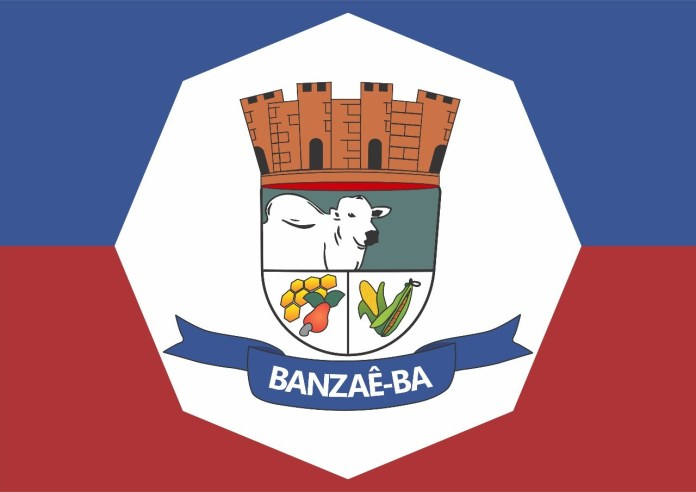
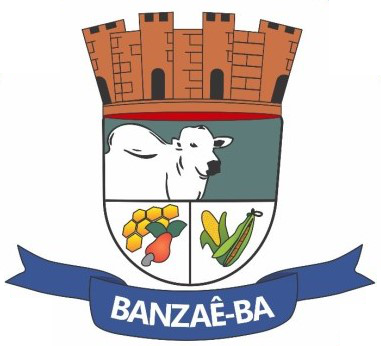
- Flag Coat of arms

- Location in Brazil
- Coordinates: 10°34′37″S 38°36′54″W
- Country: Brazil
- Region: Nordeste
- State: Bahia

Population (2020)
  - Total: 13,240
- Time zone: UTC−3 (BRT)

Banzaê is a municipality in the state of Bahia in the North-East region of Brazil.

== Indigenous communities ==
Seven indigenous communities were set up in 1990, namely (Mirandela) Sacão, Cacimba Seca, Canta-Galo, Lagoa Grande, Baixa da Cangalha, Marcação, and Picos.

The Jesuit mission of Saco dos Morcegos was founded in 1667 by the Jesuit missionary João de Barros, and a newer mission church was later built by Father Francisco de Matos in 1701. Today, it is an indigenous village known as Mirandela, and is one of the four indigenous villages occupied by the Kiriri people in Banzaê.

== See also ==
- List of municipalities in Bahia
- Kariri languages
