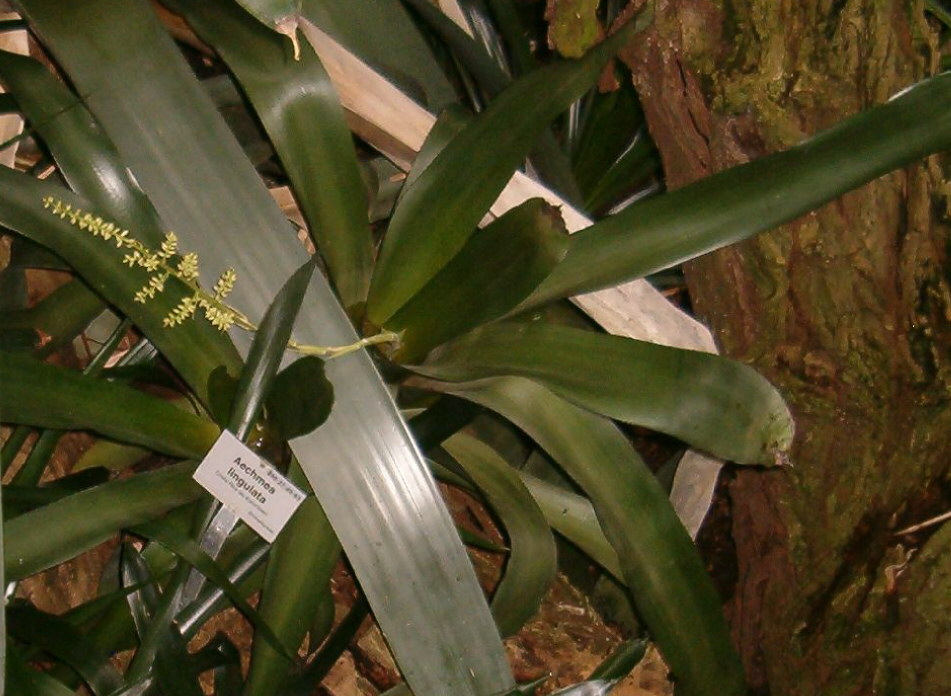

Scientific classification
- Kingdom: Plantae
- Clade: Tracheophytes
- Clade: Angiosperms
- Clade: Monocots
- Clade: Commelinids
- Order: Poales
- Family: Bromeliaceae
- Genus: Aechmea
- Subgenus: Aechmea subg. Aechmea
- Species: A. lingulata

Binomial name
- Aechmea lingulata (Linnaeus) Baker

Synonyms
- Bromelia lingulata L.; Hoplophytum lingulatum (L.) Beer; Chevaliera lingulata (L.) Griseb.; Wittmackia lingulata (L.) Mez; Bromelia lingularia Houtt.; Billbergia odora Miq.; Aechmea surinamensis Beer; Lamprococcus ramosus Beer; Hohenbergia odora (Miq.) Baker; Aechmea odora (Miq.) Baker; Aechmea plumieri Baker; Aechmea poeppigii Baker; Wittmackia odora (Miq.) Mez; Wittmackia glaziovii Mez; Wittmackia poeppigii (Baker) Mez

= Aechmea lingulata =

Species of flowering plant

Aechmea lingulata is a plant species in the genus Aechmea. This species is native to the West Indies (Bahamas, Trinidad, Puerto Rico, Lesser Antilles etc.), Costa Rica, Panama and northern South America.

Two varieties are recognized:

1. Aechmea lingulata var. lingulata - most of species range
2. Aechmea lingulata var. patentissima (Mart. ex Schult. & Schult.f.) L.B.Sm. - eastern Brazil

== History ==
Indigenous people were the first to use this plant in their traditions. Currently, the Fulni-Ô people, from brazilian northeast, still use this plant in their traditional medicine and to make tools.
