= Sarará =

Multiracial person in Brazil

In Brazil, a sarará (Portuguese pronunciation: [saɾɐˈɾa] or [saɾaˈɾa]) is a multiracial person, being a particular kind of mulato or juçara (a tri-racial pardo with Amerindian features) with perceivable Black African facial features, light complexion and fair but curly (cabelo crespo) or Afro-textured hair (carapinha, cabelo encarapinhado or cabelo pixaim; IPA: [piʃɐˈĩˑ]). In the 1998 IBGE PME (Monthly Employment Survey), 0.04% of respondents identified, in an inquiry on race/colour, as "sarará".

While the emphasis on fair skin in Brazil is not as visible as in other post-colonial societies, with many preferring and advocating for the moreno or olive skin beauty standard, European facial features and hair texture are a beauty standard in Brazil; many people of diverse backgrounds use flat irons and chemical hair treatments to pass their hair as straight or wavy. In a society that divides between "white" and "black", sararás will be placed together with the Brown-skinned pardos as non-whites, despite their fair complexion and hair.

== Background ==
It is known that the genes responsible for blonde hair and red hair are recessive, so that a person with full Amerindian or sub-Saharan African ancestry, or a mixing between the two, is very unlikely to have red-haired or blond-haired offspring, no matter how fair the complexion of their Caucasian or multiracial partner. The genes responsible for brown hair are also extremely rare among Indigenous peoples of the Americas and Black Africans, but not as uncommon as blonde or red hair.

The most common hair colour in Brazil is brown. However, natural blond and red hair are especially found in the south where 78% of the population has European phenotype. Southern Brazil is home to large German-Austrian (Santa Catarina), Dutch, Norwegian, Northern Italian, and Slavic (Paraná) populations, and the Southeast Region has the largest absolute numbers of white Brazilians.

Today, about 21% of Brazilians descend from the country's indigenous peoples and Portuguese settlers, as well as Dutch, French and Spanish colonial settlers, including Crypto-Jews or Anusim and Roma people, while 7% to 25% also have African slave ancestors. Since the arrival of the Portuguese in 1500, considerable miscegenation between these groups has taken place in all regions of the country (with European ancestry being dominant nationwide according to the vast majority of all autosomal studies undertaken covering the entire population, accounting for between 65% and 77%).

=== European colonization and immigration waves ===
Most Portuguese colonists, as well as most Portuguese immigrants to Brazil came from northern Portugal, which are its blondest regions. Colonial Brazil was also home to Dutch invaders, many of whom stayed in Brazil even after their territorial loss. The second most common non-Portuguese European group in Colonial Brazil was the French.

The earliest post-colonization European mass immigration started by the 1830s, and increased in part due to the end of slavery in Brazil. Together with the Germans and the Swiss came Italians. While the origins of Italian immigrants to Brazil were evenly distributed across southern, central, and northern regions, most early Italian colonists came from the northern provinces that bordered other European countries. Other immigration waves from all regions of Europe, as well the Levantine Arabs and East Asians, came thereafter.

A colonial Spanish genetic contribution is present in the southernmost state of Rio Grande do Sul, with some estimates placing it almost as high as that of the Portuguese. Up to 15 million people nowadays are descendants of post-independence Spanish immigration waves. As with those descended from the Portuguese, most Brazilians of Spanish heritage trace it to the blondest region of Spain, Galicia.

=== Degree of European descent of non-white Brazilians ===
Genetic research on ancestry of Brazilians of different races has extensively shown that, regardless of skin colour, Brazilians generally have European, African and Amerindian ancestors.

According to a genetic study about Brazilians, on the paternal side, 98% of the White Brazilian Y chromosome comes from a European male ancestor, only 2% from an African ancestor, and there is a complete absence of Amerindian contributions. On the maternal side, 39% have European mitochondrial DNA, compared to 33% Amerindian and 28% African mtDNA. This analysis only includes a small fraction of a person's ancestry: the Y chromosome comes from a single male ancestor and the mtDNA from a single female ancestor, while the contributions of other ancestors is not specified. An analysis of Black Brazilians' Y chromosome, which comes from male ancestors through the paternal line, concluded that 50% of the Black Brazilian population has at least one European male ancestor, 48% has at least one African male ancestor, and 1.6% has at least one Amerindian male ancestor. An analysis of their mitochondrial DNA, which comes from female ancestors though the maternal line, found that 85% have at least one African female ancestor who came from Africa, 12.5% have at one Amerindian female ancestor, and only 2.5% have at least one European female ancestor. These results show that miscegenation in Brazil was directional and gendered, primarily occurring between Portuguese males and African and Amerindian females.

As for the complete genetic ancestry of Brazilians, research has shown that it is predominantly European, even among non-white Brazilians. According to a study of autosomal DNA collected in the poor periphery of Rio de Janeiro, pardos there were found to be on average over 80% European. The "whites," who thought of themselves as "very mixed," were found to have very little Amerindian and/or African admixtures. In general, the test results showed that European ancestry is far more prevalent than participants thought it would be. Another study on autosomal DNA showed that Brazilians as a whole, from all regions and of all complexions, are genetically more closely linked to Europeans than to Africans or mestizos from Mexico. This shows that the genotypes of individuals in a miscigenated population does not necessarily match their phenotype.

Another autosomal DNA study from 2010 found that almost 80% of Brazilians' genes are of European origin in all regions except in the South, where it makes up 90% regardless of one's census racial classification. "Ancestry-informative SNPs can be useful to estimate individual and population biogeographical ancestry. Brazilian population is characterized by a genetic background of three parental populations (European, African, and Brazilian Native Amerindians) with a wide degree and diverse patterns of admixture. In this work we analyzed the information content of 28 ancestry-informative SNPs into multiplexed panels using three parental population sources (African, Amerindian, and European) to infer the genetic admixture in an urban sample of the five Brazilian geopolitical regions. The SNPs assigned apart the parental populations from each other and thus can be applied for ancestry estimation in a three hybrid admixed population. Data was used to infer genetic ancestry in Brazilians with an admixture model. Pairwise estimates of F(st) among the five Brazilian geopolitical regions suggested little genetic differentiation only between the South and the remaining regions. Estimates of ancestry results are consistent with the heterogeneous genetic profile of Brazilian population, with a major contribution of European ancestry (0.771) followed by African (0.143) and Amerindian contributions (0.085). The described multiplexed SNP panels can be useful tool for bioanthropological studies but it can be mainly valuable to control for spurious results in genetic association studies in admixed populations." The samples came from free of charge paternity test takers, thus as the researchers made it explicit: "the paternity tests were free of charge, the population samples involved people of variable socioeconomic strata, although likely to be leaning slightly towards the pardo group".
