= Yatê =

Indigenous language of Brazil

- Carnijó, Fulni-ô
- Yaa:thê
- Pronunciation: [ja:the]
- Native to: Brazil
- Region: Águas Belas, Pernambuco
- Ethnicity: 7,000 Fulni-ô (2020)
- Native speakers: 500 (2020)
- Language family: Language isolate
- Dialects: Fulniô; Yatê

Language codes
- ISO 639-3: fun
- Glottolog: fuln1247
- ELP: Yaté
- Linguasphere: 89-DAA-aa
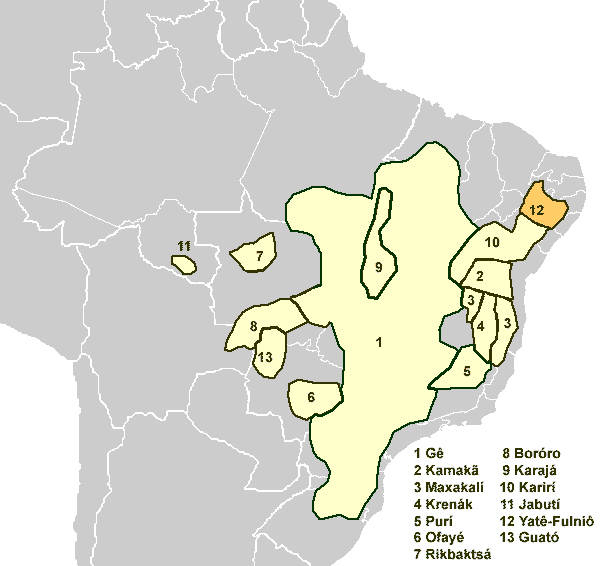

- Yatê is classified as Severely Endangered by the UNESCO Atlas of the World's Languages in Danger.

Yatê or Iatê, the Fulni-ô language (Fulniô pronunciation: [ja:the]), is a language isolate of Brazil, and the only indigenous language remaining in the northeastern part of that country. The two dialects, Fulniô and Yatê, are very close. The Fulniô dialect is used primarily during a three-month religious retreat. Today, the language is spoken in Águas Belas, Pernambuco. As of 2020, there were 500 fluent speakers of Yatê out of 7,000 Fulni-ô.

The language is also called Carnijó, and alternate spellings are Fornió, Furniô, Yahthe, and Iatê.

== Name ==
The name "Yatê" means 'our speech' in the language, from ja 'our' and athe 'speech'.

== Classification ==
Kaufman (1990, 1994, 2007) classified Fulniô as one of the Macro-Jê languages. However, Eduardo Ribeiro of the University of Chicago, who is working on large-scale classification of Brazilian languages, finds no evidence to support this, and treats it as an isolate. Jolkesky (2016) again has it as Macro-Jê, but Nikulin (2020) again excludes it.

== Phonology ==
Phonemes in (parentheses) are labeled as "problematic" by Costa (1999); sounds in [square brackets] are analyzed as allophones of other phonemes, but are also considered "problematic".

=== Consonants ===
Yatê contains the following consonant phonemes.

		Labial	Coronal				Velar	Glottal
		Labial	anterior		non-anterior		Velar	Glottal
		Labial	voiceless	voiced	voiceless	voiced	Velar	Glottal
Occlusive	plain	(p)	t	d			k	[ʔ]
Occlusive	aspirated	(pʰ)	tʰ				kʰ	
Occlusive	palatalized		[tʲ]	[dʲ]				
Nasal		m		n				
Fricative		f	s	[z]	ʃ			
Affricate	plain		ts		tʃ	dʒ		
Affricate	aspirated				tʃʰ			
Lateral				l		ʎ		
Approximant		w				j		h

[p] and [pʰ] are found exclusively in loanwords or onomatopoeic words, but are phonemic according to Costa (1999), as exemplified by the following minimal pairs.

- [puli] 'poor' (< Portuguese pobre) vs. [fuli] 'river'
- [tupia] 'Black person' (< Kariri [tapuinua]) vs. [tusia] 'sour'

In certain positions, /w/ and /j/ have an allophone of [ʔ], which was analyzed as phonemic by Barbosa (1991) and implicitly by Lapenda (1968).

- [feja] ~ [feʔa] ~ [feːa] 'earth'
- [fowa] ~ [foʔa] ~ [foːa] 'stone'

When a suffix found in a bi-morphemic word does not begin with a vowel, [w] and [j] are maintained and are not realized as [ʔ].

- [fejke] 'on earth'
- [fowde] 'of the stone'

The realization of /w, j/ as [ʔ] seems to occur only when the preceding vowel is homorganic; otherwise, [w] and [j] are also maintained.

- [faja] 'bed' vs. [faja ke] 'on the bed'
- [tawa] 'stone used for body painting' vs. [tawa te] 'with stone used for body painting'

[ʔ] may also occur word-finally phonetically. Out of all consonants, only approximants may also occur in this position.

- [lefetijaʔ] 'ox'

[tʲ, dʲ] are not predictable in their phonetic occurrences but are analyzed as phonemic by Costa (1999). Their occurrence is optional, with the exception being in the forms [dʲoka] and [dʲaka].

[tʲ] can be found word-initially where the vowel /i/ should exist, preceding a coronal, non-anterior or dorsal consonant.

- [tʲtsalɛ] 'my tongue' (underlying /i ktsalɛ/)

[dʲ], word-initially, occurs where the vowel /i/ should exist, prior to another vowel. Only two instances of this are attested; [dʲ] occurs always in these words.

- [dʲoka] 'I go' (underlying /i+o+ka/)
- [dʲaka] 'I am' (underlyingly /i+a+ka/)

No vowel other than /i/ can surface as [tʲ, dʲ], although the processes are only found in a few words. Due to their rarity, these processes are considered idiosyncratic by Costa (1999).

Word-medially, /t, d/ become [tʲ, dʲ] following /i/, in the same environment as /k/ realizing as [kʲ], though few instances of this are attested.

- /e tʃi+taka+ka/ [e tʃᵊtʲakᵊka] 'he wants to come'
- /e+tʃi+dode+ka/ [etʃᵊdʲotkʲa] 'he doesn't arrive'

[z] is found only in the interjective particle [zaawa] 'happily'. It does not occur as an allophone of any other phoneme. Costa (1999) does not consider it a phoneme.

Affricates in Yatê are considered complex sounds by Costa (1999).

/h/ is articulated similarly to the h in English as in the words house and horse, due to influence from Portuguese. However, it acts phonologically identically as the other approximants, /j/ and /w/.

=== Vowels ===
	Coronal		Dorsal		Labial	
	short	long	short	long	short	long
High	i	iː			u	uː
Mid	e	eː			o	oː
Low	ɛ		a	aː	ɔ	

Long vowels are considered by Meland and Meland (1967) and Costa (1999) to be the result of deletion of /h/ and non-phonemic. However, the latter notes that they are not predictable synchronically.

== Vocabulary ==
=== Nikulin (2020) ===
Some Yaathê words given by Nikulin (2020), cited from Lapenda (1965, 2005 [1968]), Barbosa (1991), Costa (1999), F. Silva (2011a, 2011b), and Branner (1887).

Portuguese gloss (original)	English gloss (translated)	Yaathê
cinza	ashes	fêlôwa
pé	foot	fêhê
folha	leaf	ta(-)cʰa
fígado	liver	ta(-)cô
dente	tooth	ta(-)xi
cabelo	hair	li
água	water	ôːja
língua	tongue	kts(ʰ)ale
boca	mouth	ta(-)tʰê
nariz	nose	kʰletʰa
olho	eye	tʰô
orelha	ear	kfakê
cabeça	head	tkʰa
fogo	fire	tôwê
árvore	tree	cʰleka
semente	seed	kêtʰôja
ouvir	hear	kfala-
dormir	sleep	kfafa-
terra	earth	fê(j)ʔa
piolho	louse	cfôwa
pedra	stone	fô(ʔ)a
chuva	rain	flicja
mão	hand	koho ~ kʰoja (?)
caminho	road	tdi
dar	give	kô-
estar sentado	be seated	kine-
estar deitado	lying down	kʰa-
ir	go	o-, no-
rabo	tail	ta(-)tô
carne	meat	ucʰi ~ utxi
nome	name	ketkʲa
unha	nail (finger)	kʰôtkʲa

== Bibliography ==
- Fulniô (Yahthe) Syntax Structure, Meland & Meland (2009 [1968])
- Phonemic Statement of the Fulniô Language, Meland & Meland (2010 [1967])
