= Kariri languages =

Extinct dialect cluster of Brazil

Karirí
- Karirian, Kipeá-Dzubukuá
- Native to: Brazil
- Region: between Bahia and Maranhão
- Ethnicity: 4,000 Kiriri people (2020)
- Extinct: (date missing)
- Revival: 1989 (Dzubukuá)
- Language family: One of the world's primary language families
- Early form: Proto-Kariri
- Dialects: Kipeá †; Kamurú †; Dzubukuá †; Sabujá †

Language codes
- ISO 639-3: kzw (Dzubukuá only)
- Glottolog: kari1254
- Linguasphere: 89-CBA-a
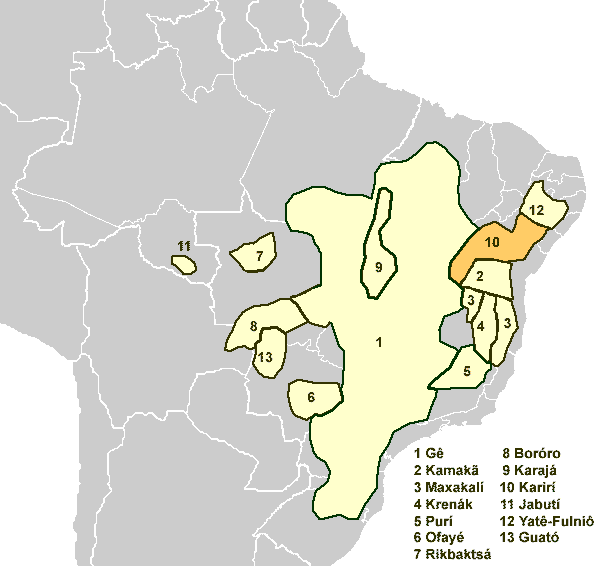
- Distribution of Kariri and Macro-Jê languages

The Karirí languages, generally considered dialects of a single language, are a group of languages formerly spoken by the Kiriri people of Brazil. It was spoken until the middle of the 20th century; The 4,000 ethnic Kiriri are now monolingual Portuguese speakers, though a few people know common phrases and names of medicinal plants. A revival of the Dzubukuá variety has been ongoing since 1989.

== History ==
After the Dutch were expelled from Northeast Brazil in the 17th century, Portuguese settlers rapidly colonized the region, forcing Kariri speakers to become widely dispersed due to forced migrations and resettlement. Hence, Kariri languages became scattered across Paraíba, Ceará, Pernambuco, Bahia, and other states.

== Classification ==
Kariri has been included in the Macro-Jê family. However, the resemblances may be superficial, and the most recent classification of Macro-Jê excludes Kariri. Ribeiro established through morphological analysis that Kariri is likely to be related to the Jê languages. This is now disputed.

== Languages ==
The four known Kariri languages or dialects are:

- Kipeá (Quipea, Kiriri)
- Kamurú (Camuru, Pedra Branca)
- Dzubukuá (Dzubucua, Kariri)
- Sabujá (Sapoyá)

There are a short grammatical description and a catechism in Kipeá, a catechism in Dzubukuá, and word lists for Kamurú and Sabujá. Modern grammatical descriptions are available for Kipeá and Dzubukuá.

Mason (1950) lists:

- Kariri
  - Cariri
    - Kipea
    - Camurú
    - Dzubucua
    - Pedra Branca
  - Sapuya

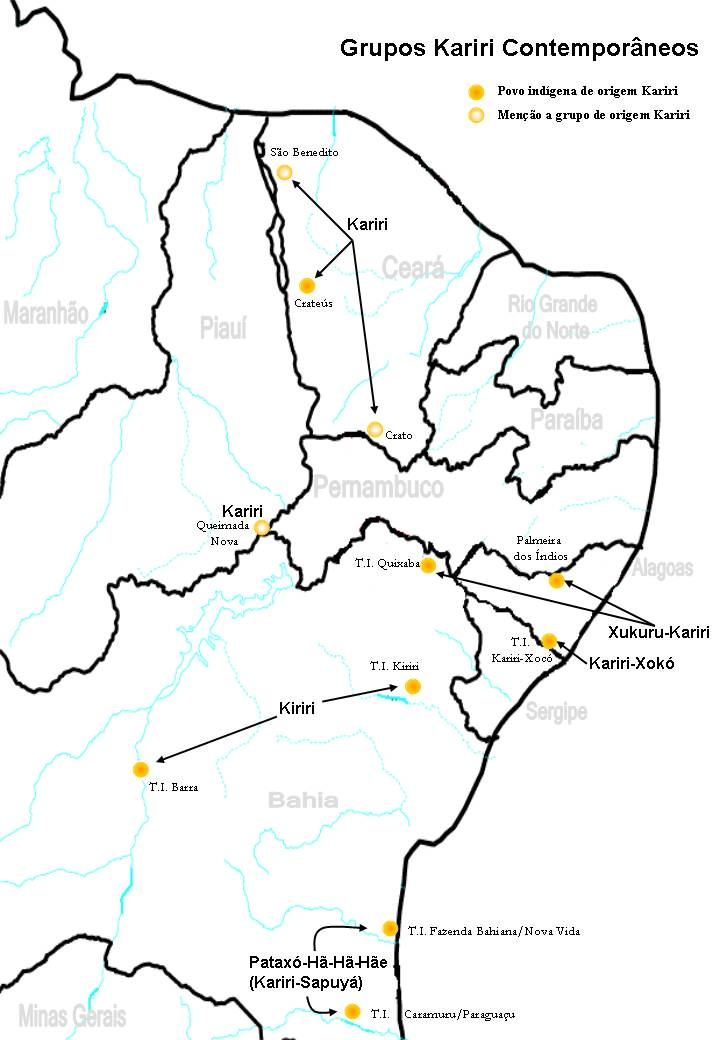
Map of modern Kariri groups

The original language of the Tumbalalá, now extinct, is effectively unattested and unclassified, but words for Tumbalalá ritual objects used in their traditional toré religion appear to be of Kariri origin, namely pujá, kwaqui, and cataioba.

== Other languages called Kariri ==
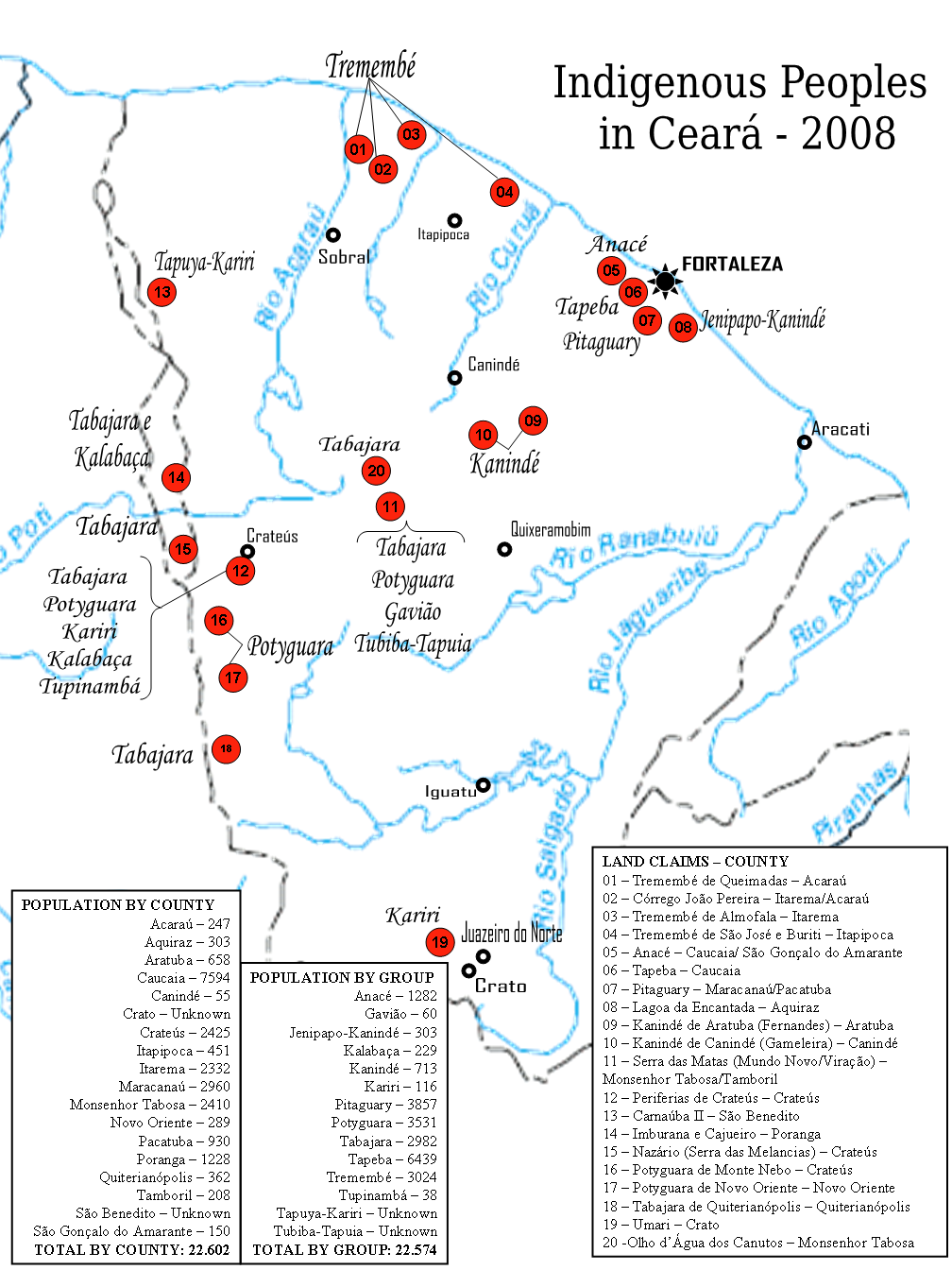
Indigenous peoples of Ceará, 2008

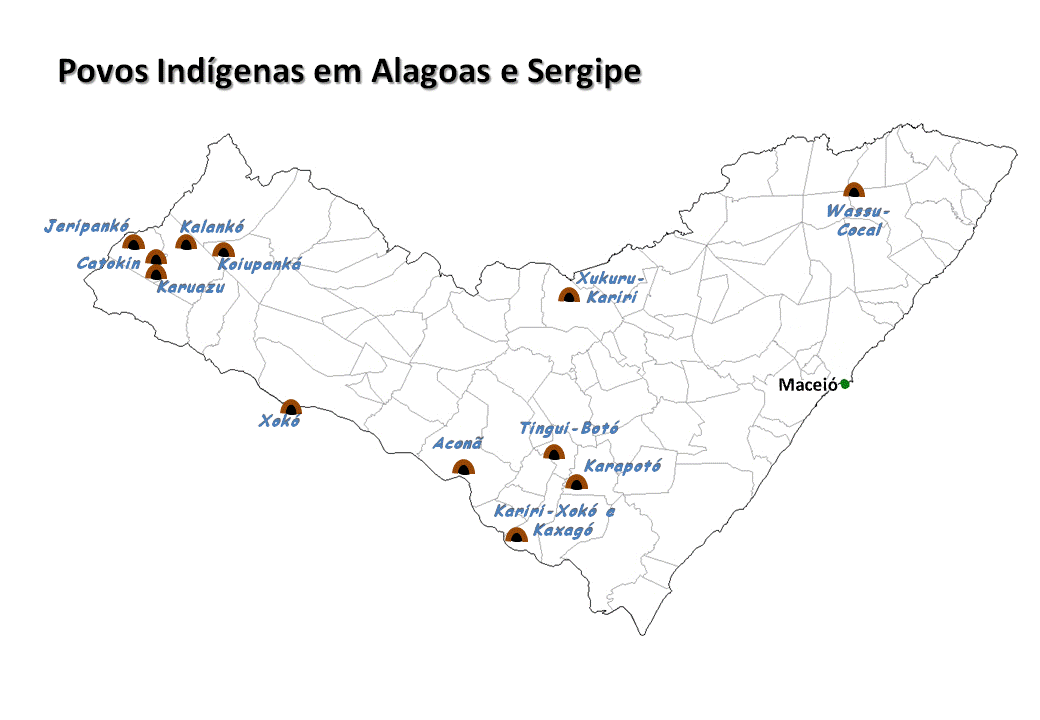
Indigenous peoples of Alagoas and Sergipe

The names Kariri and Kiriri were applied to many peoples over a wide area in the east of Brazil, in the lower and middle São Francisco River area and further north. Most of their now-extinct languages are too poorly known to classify, but what is recorded does not suggest that they were all members of the Kariri family. Examples are:

- Katembri (Kiriri, Kariri, Kariri de Mirandela [near Banzaê and Quijingue in Bahia])
  - It appears to be a Kariri language with some substratum from an unidentified language, generally assumed to be that of the Katembri.
- Xocó (Xokó, Chocó [in Sergipe], Kariri-Xocó, Kariri-Shoko, Cariri-Chocó [in Alagoas], Xukuru-Kariri, Xucuru-Kariri, Xucuru-Cariri [in Alagoas])
  - Three populations. Not clear if this was one language or three. In the Porto Real do Colégio and Palmeira dos Índios areas of Alagoas.

== Language contact ==
Ramirez et al. (2015) note that Kariri languages display some lexical similarities with Cariban languages. Similarities with Katembri (also known as Kariri of Mirandela) or possibly Kaimbé may be due to either a Kariri superstratum or substratum in Katembri.

== Syntax ==
Unlike most Macro-Jê languages which are SOV, Karirí languages are verb-initial (VSO) and make use of prepositions.

== Vocabulary ==
=== Loanwords ===
Eastern Macro-Jê loanwords in Kariri languages:

gloss	Kipeá	Dzubukuá	other languages
beans	ghinhé	guenhie	giñá (Kotoxó)
hammock	pité	pitta	pita (Coroado)
Black person	gorá		engorá (Krenák)
swamp, marsh	pôhô		pohok (Maxakalí)
cow, cattle	cradzó	cradzo	krazo ‘tapir’ (Masakará)

Tupinambá loanwords in Kariri languages:

gloss	Kipeá	Dzubukuá	Tupinambá	other Eastern Macro-Jê languages
needle	awí		abi	Maxakalí ãmix
banana	bacobá		pacova	Coroado bacóba
White person	caraí	carai	caraíba	Iatê klai, Krenák krai
box	cramemú		caramẽmuã	
domestic pig	curé		curê	Krenák kurek
pumpkin	erumú		jurumũ, jeremũ	Purí šurumúm ‘potato’
bread	miapé		miapé	
beads	myghý	muihi	mboýra	
oil	nhendí	nianddi	nhandy	
bench	pycá		apycába	
chicken, hen	sabucá	dapuca	(güyra)ssapucáia	
Black person	tapanhú	tapwinhiu	tapyyiúna	Coroado tabañiú, Makoni tapagnon, Malalí tapagnon
Black person			tapyýia	Iatê tupia
hoe	tasí		itassýra	Maxakalí taxunna
money	tayú	tayu	itajúba	Maxakalí tayũmak
God	tupã	tupam	tupã	Maxakalí topa, Krenák kupan, Coroado tupan
priest	waré	padzuare	abaré	Maxakalí ãmãnex, Macuni amattèih, Coroado uáre, Masakará ampari
mirror	waruá		guaruguá	
sugarcane mill	wirapararã		ybyrapararánga	

Portuguese loanwords in Kariri languages borrowed via Tupinambá and other intermediate sources:

gloss	Kipeá	Dzubukuá	Possible intermediate sources	Portuguese	other Macro-Jê languages
goat	cabará	cabara	cabará (Tupinambá)	cabra	
horse	cabarú		cavarú (Tupinambá)	cavalo	Coroado kawarú, Cotoxó cavaró
cross	crusá	crudzá	curussá (Tupinambá)	cruz	Iatê klusa
devil	nhewó	niẽwo	niñavoo (Kapoxó)	diabo	
paper			papera	papel	Iatê wapela, Coroado tapera
