= Quijingue =

Municipality of Bahia, Brazil

- Municipality
- Quijingue
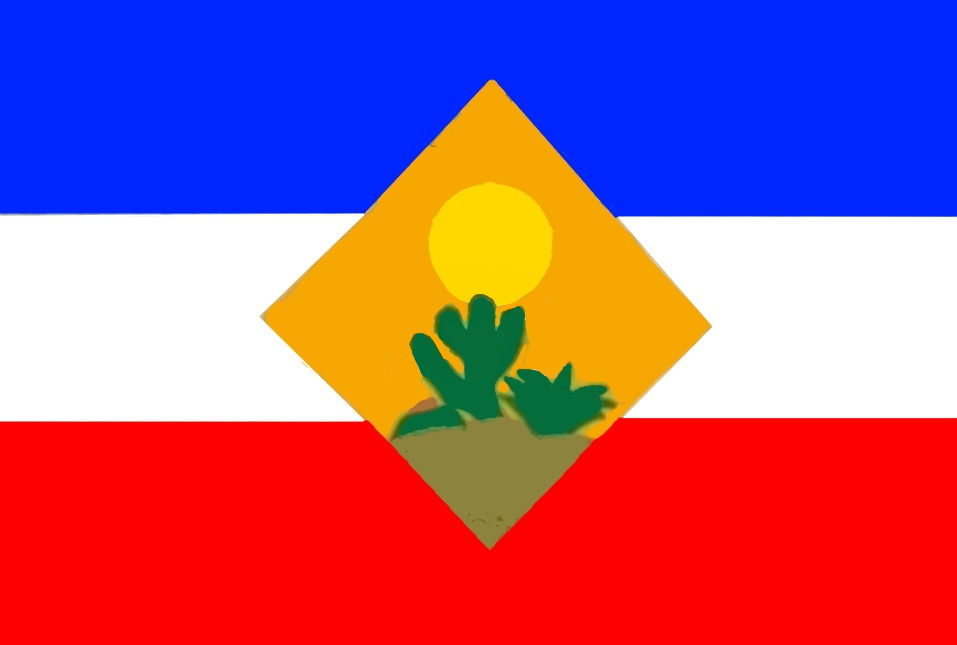
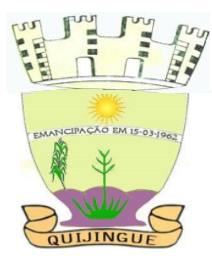
- Flag Coat of arms
- Interactive map of Quijingue
- Coordinates: 10°45′S 39°12′W
- Country: Brazil
- Region: Northeast
- State: Bahia

Population (2020)
  - Total: 27,626
- Time zone: UTC−3 (BRT)
- Postal Code: 48830-000
- Area code: +55 75
- Website: www.quijingue.ba.gov.br

Quijingue is a municipality in the state of Bahia in the North-East region of Brazil. Luva de Pedreiro was born here

== See also ==
- List of municipalities in Bahia
