= Kariri people =

Kariri
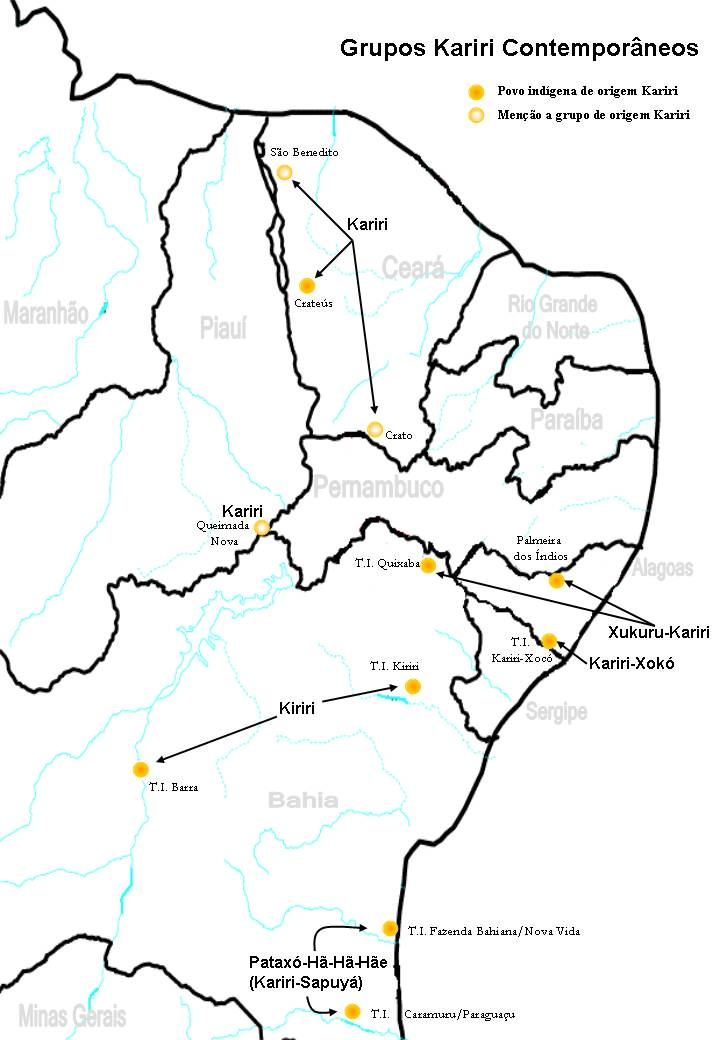
- Map of traditional Kariri territory

Total population
- 1,612 (2006)

Regions with significant populations
- Brazil (Ceará)

Languages
- Portuguese, formerly Kariri

Religion
- Toré religion

The Kariri people are an Indigenous people of Eastern Brazil. Their name is also spelled Cariri and comes from the Tupi word kyrirĩ meaning 'silent' or 'taciturn'.

== History ==
The French Capuchin missionary Martin of Nantes (1638–1714) was the apostle of the Kariri people on the São Francisco River between 1672 and 1683.

The various Kariri peoples were settled in different towns (aldeia) and villages (vila), listed as follows.

Captaincy	Town or municipality	Village or location	Patron saint	Missionary order	Group
Bahia	Jaguaripe do Rio da Aldeia	Jaguaripe	Sto. Antônio	Clerics Brotherhood	Kariri
Bahia	Conquista da Pedra Branca	Cachoeira			Kariri
Bahia	Caranguejo	Cachoeira			Sapuyá
Bahia	Rio Real	Vila da Abadia	Jesus, Maria, José	Carmelite	Kiriri
Bahia	Aramaris	São João da Água Fria		Clerics Brotherhood	Kiriri
Bahia	Natuba	Itapicuru	N. Sra. da Conceição	Jesuit	Kiriri
Bahia	Canabrava	Itapicuru	Sta. Teresa	Jesuit	Kiriri
Bahia	Saco dos Morcegos	Itapicuru	Ascensão de Cristo	Jesuit	Kiriri
Bahia	Massacará	Itapicuru	Sma. Trindade	Franciscan	Kiriri, Kaimbé
Sergipe	Juru	Lagarto	N. Sra. do Socorro	Jesuit	Kiriri
Pernambuco	Gameleira	Alagoas	N. Sra. das Brotas	Clerics Brotherhood	Kariri, Língua Geral and Uruá
Pernambuco	São Brás	Penedo	N. Sra. do Ó	Jesuit	Kariri and Progéz
Pernambuco	Ilha do Pambu	Rio São Francisco	N. Sra. da Conceição	Capuchin	Kariri
Pernambuco	Ilha de Aracapá	Rio São Francisco	S. Francisco	Capuchin	Kariri
Pernambuco	Ilha do Cavalo	Rio São Francisco	S. Félix	Capuchin	Kariri
Pernambuco	Ilha do Irapuá	Rio São Francisco	Sto. Antônio	Capuchin	Kariri
Pernambuco	Ilha de Inhanhuns	Rio São Francisco	N. Sra. da Piedade	Franciscan	Kariri
Paraíba	Cariris	Taypu	N. Sra. do Pillar	Capuchin	Kariri
Ceará	Miranda	Icó	N. Sra. da Penha de França	Capuchin	Kariri, Quixelô, Quixeréu, Cariú, Cariuané, Calabaça, and Icozinho

== Territory ==
Today a large portion of their traditional homelands is still called the Cariris region. Within this region are two cities, Crato and Juazeiro do Norte.

The Chapada Diamantina has a dramatic landscape with high plains, table-top mesas, and steep cliffs or towers known as 'tepuy.' Before the arrival of the Portuguese in the 19th century, the only local inhabitants of the region were indigenous Indians from the Maracas and Cariris tribes. In 1985, the Chapada Diamantina National Park was created with its headquarters in Palmeiras.

Kiriri people live in the Kiriri Indigenous Territory, an indigenous territory. Through their successful political organization, they were able to expel 1,200 non-native squatters from their lands since 1990.
