= Anchieta =

Anchieta may refer to:

== People ==
- José de Anchieta, S.J. (1534-1597), a Catholic saint, Jesuit missionary, writer, poet and apostle of Brazil, or the following places and things
- José Alberto de Oliveira Anchieta (1832–1897), Portuguese explorer and zoologist
- Juan de Anchieta (sculptor) (1540-1588), Spanish sculptor
- Juan de Anchieta (1462–1523), Spanish composer
- José de Anchieta Júnior (1965–2018), a Brazilian politician
- Anchieta Patriota, a Brazilian politician

== Places ==
- Anchieta Island, in the northern coast of the state of São Paulo (state), Brazil, famous as the site of a former state prison.
- Anchieta, Espírito Santo, a municipality (formerly known as Reritiba) in the state of Espírito Santo, Brazil.
- Anchieta, Rio de Janeiro, a suburb in northern Rio de Janeiro (city), Brazil.
- Anchieta, Rio Grande do Sul, a neighborhood in Porto Alegre city, Brazil.
- Anchieta, Santa Catarina, a municipality in the state of Santa Catarina, Brazil.
- Rodovia Anchieta, a highway, running between São Paulo and Santos, Brazil.
- Anchieta Palace (Espírito Santo), a governmental building in the city of Vitória, Brazil.
- Anchieta College (Porto Alegre), a private primary and secondary school in the city of Porto Alegre, Brazil.
- Casa Anchieta, the childhood home of Father Anchieta in San Cristóbal de La Laguna, Tenerife.

Note. Since the Jesuit priest José de Anchieta is considered one of the early historical founding fathers of Brazil as a nation, he is hommaged by an uncountable number of schools, hospitals, government buildings, monuments, neighborhood, streets, plazas, geographical locations, etc. in almost all Brazilian cities. Here only the most important ones are listed.

== Other ==
- Fundação Padre Anchieta, educational TV and radio stations of the state of São Paulo
