= Anchieta Palace (Espírito Santo) =

Palace and seat of government

Coordinates: 20°19′17″S 40°20′23″W

- Palácio Anchieta
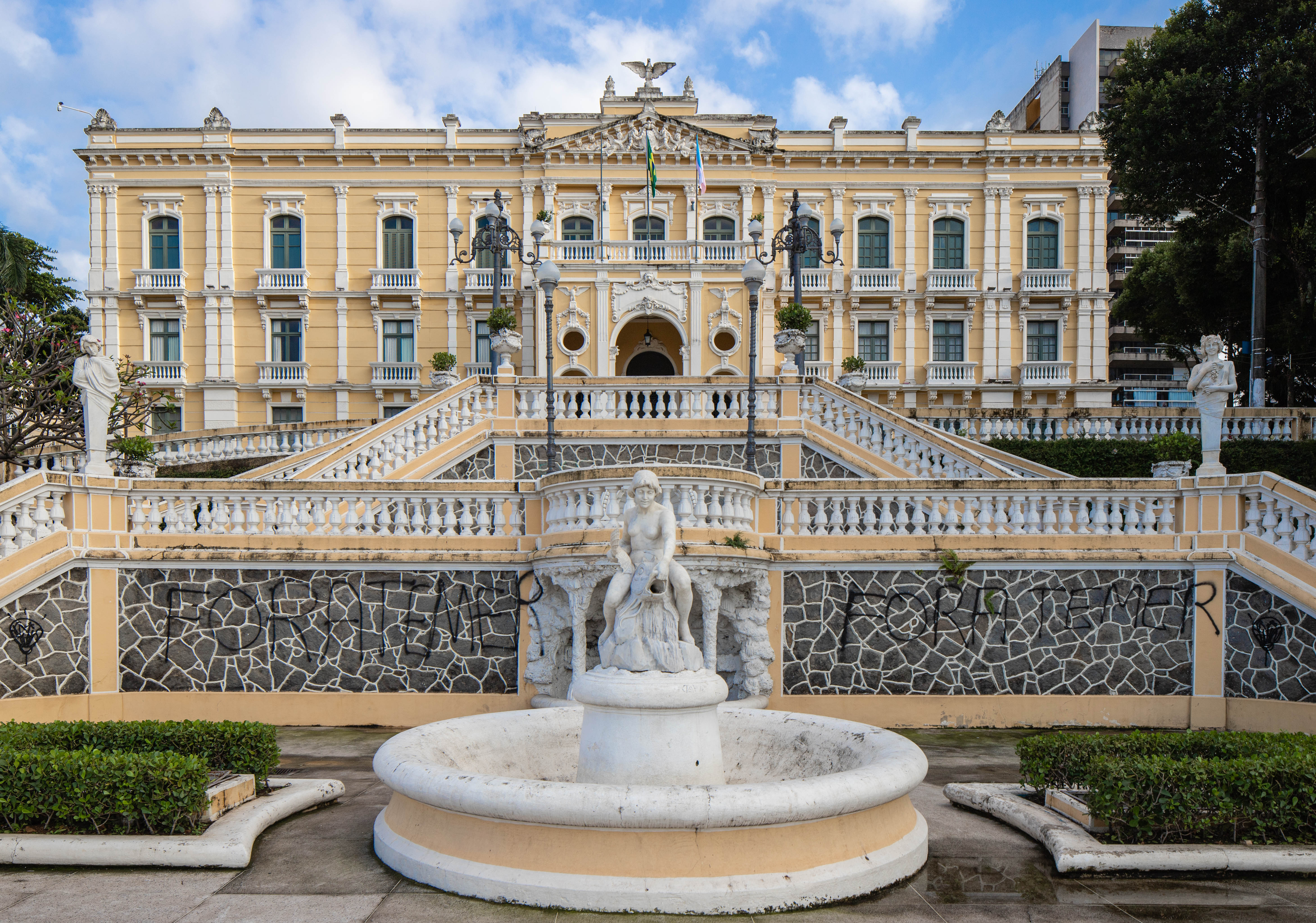
- Interactive map of the Anchieta Palace area
- Former names: Church of St. James; College of Saint Mauritius; Presidential Palace

General information
- Location: Espírito Santo, Vitória, Brazil
- Construction started: 1551 (First Church of St. James)
- Completed: 1935
- Owner: Government of the State of Espírito Santo

Design and construction
- Architects: Afonso Brás; Justin Norbert

Anchieta Palace is the seat of the executive branch of the state of Espírito Santo, Brazil. It is located in the city of Vitória, directly in front of the Port of Vitória at the entrance of Cidade Alta, one of the oldest neighborhoods in the city. The palace has been used as the seat of the government of the State of Espírito Santo since the 18th century, making it one of the oldest seats of government in Brazil.

== History ==
In 1551, the priests of the Society of Jesus, led by Father Afonso Brás, started building the architectural complex currently known as Anchieta Palace. Brás described his arrival in the captaincy of Espírito Santo and the work undertaken on August 24, 1551:

From Porto Seguro to Espírito Santo there are sixty leagues. When we arrive, the residents welcomed us with great pleasure and joy, and since I arrived until Easter, I didn't care or understand anything else, if not to confess and make a poor home, so we can retreat into it; it is covered with straw and without walls. I will work to build a chapel next to it in a very good location, in which we can say mass, to confess, preach doctrine and the like. (...) We preach the doctrine every day to the slaves of this village, who are many. (...) It is this land where I am at present the best and most fertile in all of Brazil.

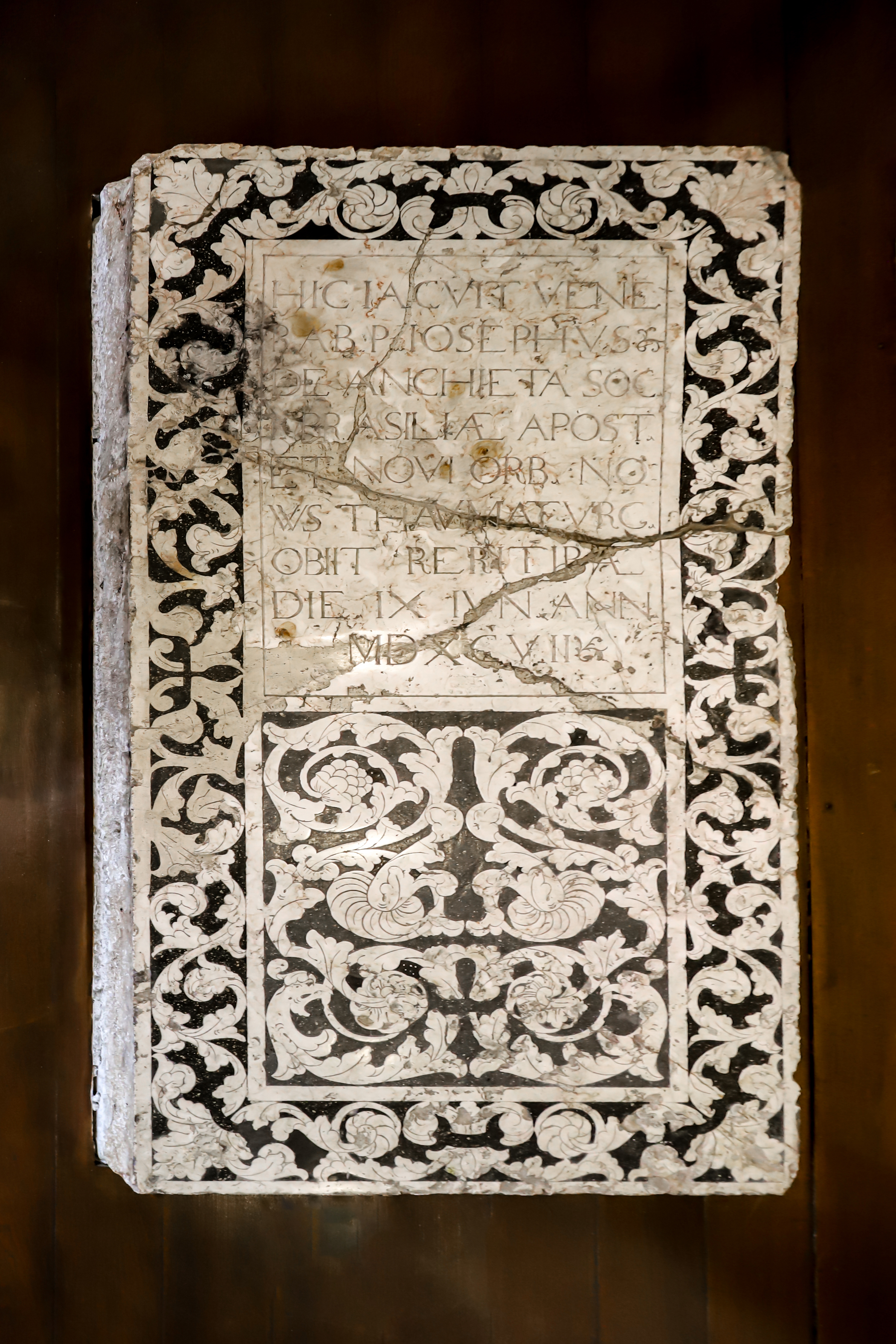
Joseph of Anchieta's tomb carved in Lioz stone

In 1570, a fire destroyed the first headquarters of the Church of St. James. Missionaries, grateful for having been welcomed after a shipwreck at the mouth of the Rio Doce, were mobilized by Father Inácio de Tolosa, and started building a new headquarters for the Church of St. James out of stone in the same location as the previous one after drilling an 8-meter (26 ft) well behind the church.

The House of St. James, in the form of a college and seminar, was for more than two hundred years the beacon of education in Espírito Santo.

Among notable people who passed through the complex was Father Joseph of Anchieta who, in 1587, was responsible for directing and completing the first wing of the St. James College facing John Climacus Square, and the church of Our Lady of Conception in Anchieta. From 1592 to 1594 he was appointed Visitor of the houses of the South. In 1596, he was appointed governor and councilor of Vitória's House. Subsequently, he was able to leave his duties and retired to Reritiba, where he died on June 9. He was buried in Vitória, in front of the main altar of the old church of St. James. In 1610, his remains were relocated to Bahia.

The Church of St. James was inaugurated at the beginning of 1552 and built next to the schoolhouse. In 1666, the church structure threatened to collapse and underwent a remodeling process, a procedure that made the church look like a new construction.

In 1707, the second wing of the college was built facing Vitória's bay, and the third wing was built in 1734, closing the inner courtyard next to the second tower of the church.

In 1727, the roof was restored and the walls supported. In 1747, the fourth wing was built adjacent to the church forming a quadrilateral. In 1757, when the Jesuits were expelled from the Portuguese colonies, the goods belonging to the clergy, as well as the Jesuit complex of St. James, were incorporated into the national heritage. In December 1759, the dean of the college and five priests were arrested.

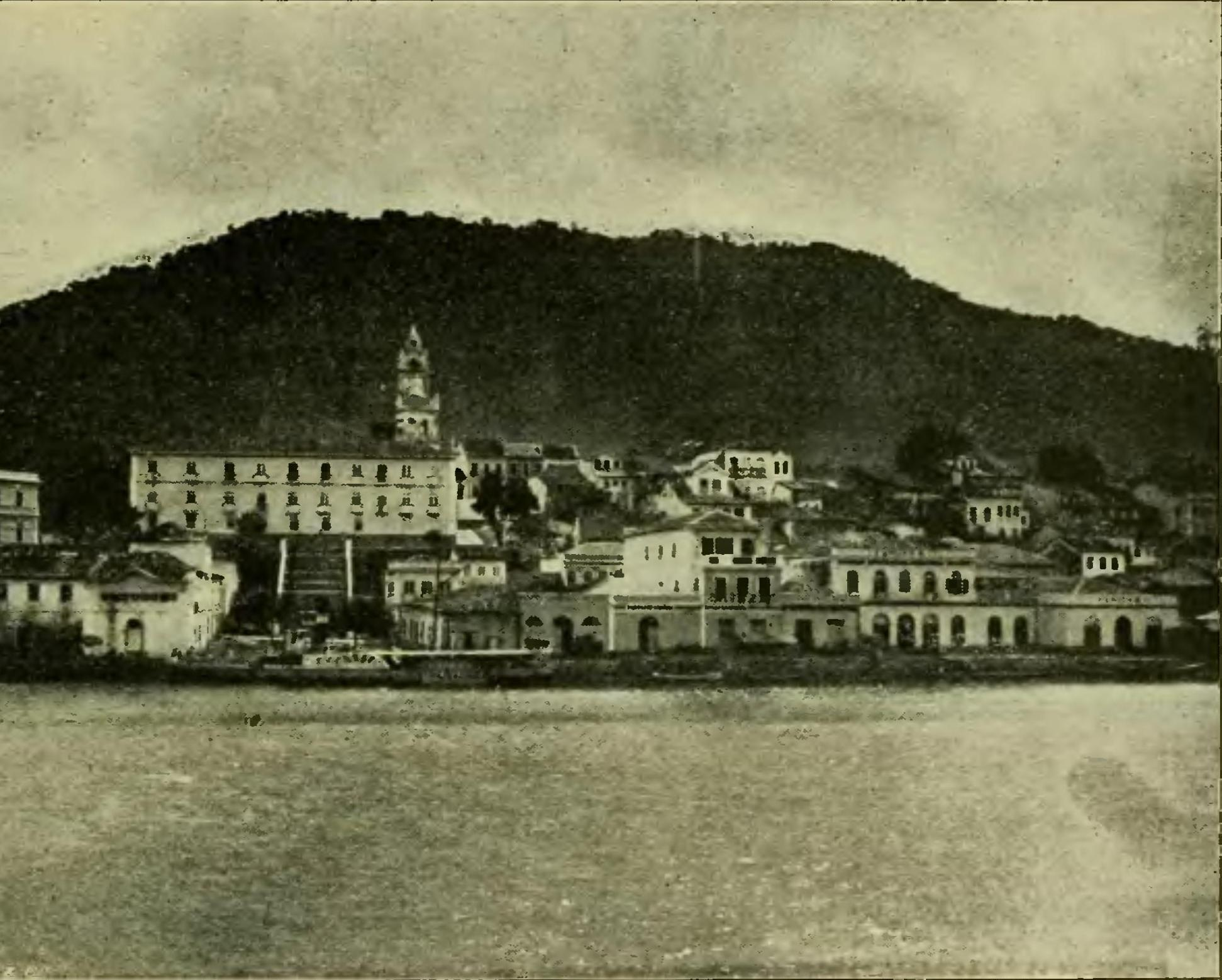
Photo of the city of Vitória in 1903. It is possible to see the Jesuit complex in the left corner with its imposing towers before undergoing remodeling under the government of Jerônimo Monteiro.

In 1796, another major fire destroyed the interior of the temple, including the image of St. James. The images of St. Ignatius of Loyola and St. Francis Xavier that were part of the altar were transferred to the church of Saint Gonsalo. In 1798, the building was recovered and renamed the Government Palace.

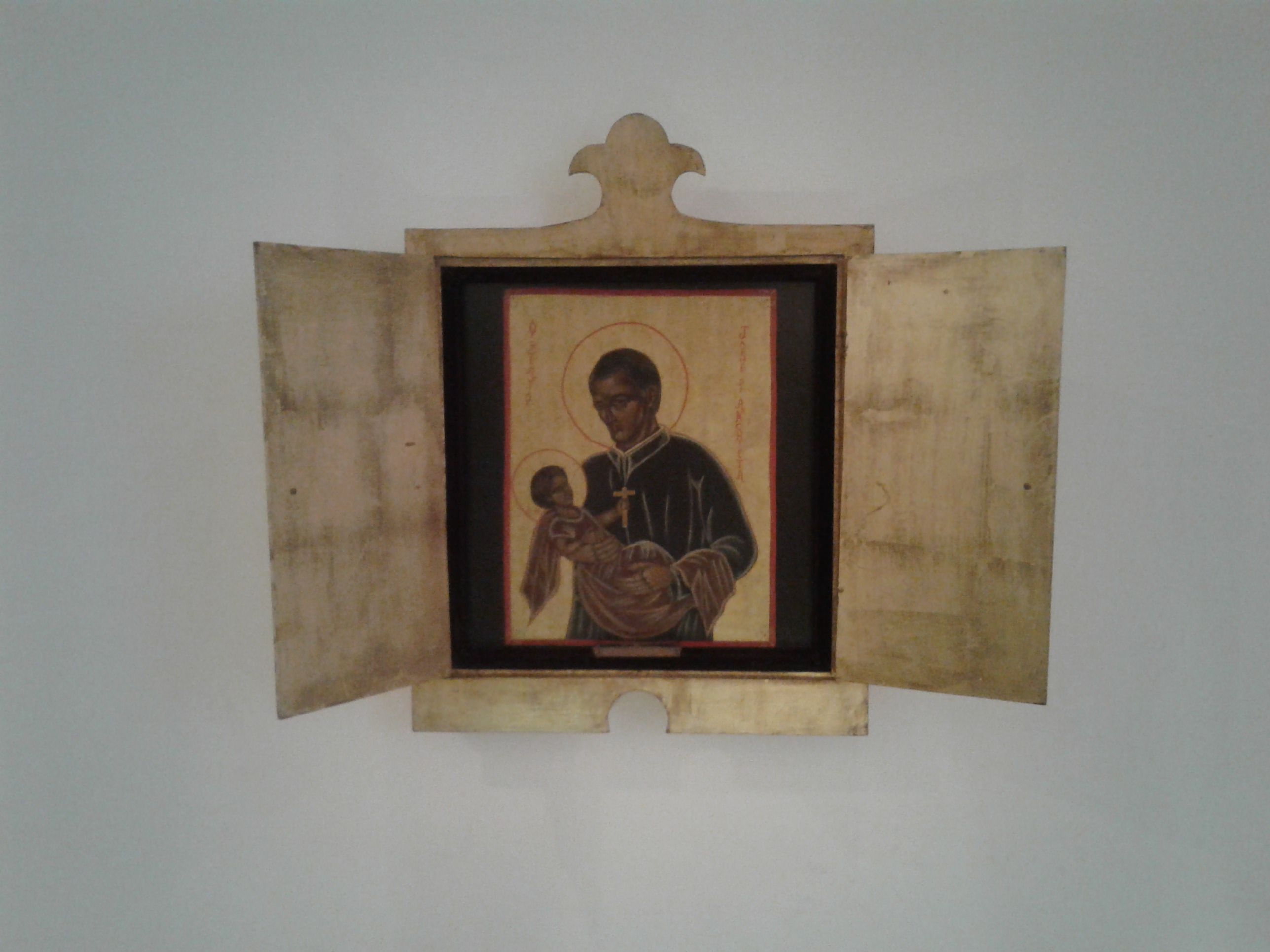
Reliquary with painting and bone fragment of Joseph of Anchieta exposed in the symbolic tomb in the Anchieta Palace

In 1860, the palace underwent renovation, and received the emperor Dom Pedro II and the empress Dona Teresa Cristina Maria, who stayed in the state for fifteen days.

During Jerônimo Monteiro's administration (1908-1912), the palace underwent major renovations. It received a new architectural garment with eclectic characteristics that were very popular in the early years of the 20th century and spread by modernists.

The works were in the charge of the French engineer Justin Norbert. The original roof was raised, the facades were remodeled, and a new opening was made towards the Bay of Vitória.

The church of St. James was purchased from the Bishopric on November 23, 1911, and attached to the palace building, an old space used as a home and college. The tower on the right was demolished in the first major renovation and the second in 1919, under the government of Bernardino Monteiro.

In 1945, the palace was officially named Anchieta by means of decree No. 15,888 signed by Governor Jones dos Santos Neves.

In 1983, the building was listed by the State Council of Culture, and the first major restoration started in 2004 and ended in 2009.

== Miscellaneous details ==
When the palace was a church, bodies were found on the grounds.

The building holds a piece of tibia from Saint Anchieta, after whom the building was named.

It is the only Jesuit construction that had two bell towers and one clock in the colonial period. It was the largest construction in Espírito Santo, and one of four buildings in Brazil that use the Sgrafito technique.

It currently has works of art with priceless values.

== See also ==
- List of Jesuit sites
