= Anchieta, Porto Alegre =

Neighbourhood in Porto Alegre, Brazil

- Neighborhood
- Location in Brazil
- Coordinates: 29°59′05″S 51°10′09″W
- Country: Brazil
- State: Rio Grande do Sul
- City: Porto Alegre

Anchieta is a neighbourhood (bairro) in the city of Porto Alegre, the state capital of Rio Grande do Sul, in Brazil. Created by Law 2022 from December 7, 1959, it was named after José de Anchieta. The neighbourhood is close to the municipality of Canoas.
