= Monument to José de Anchieta =

Monumental statue of Joseph of Anchieta by Bruno Giorgi

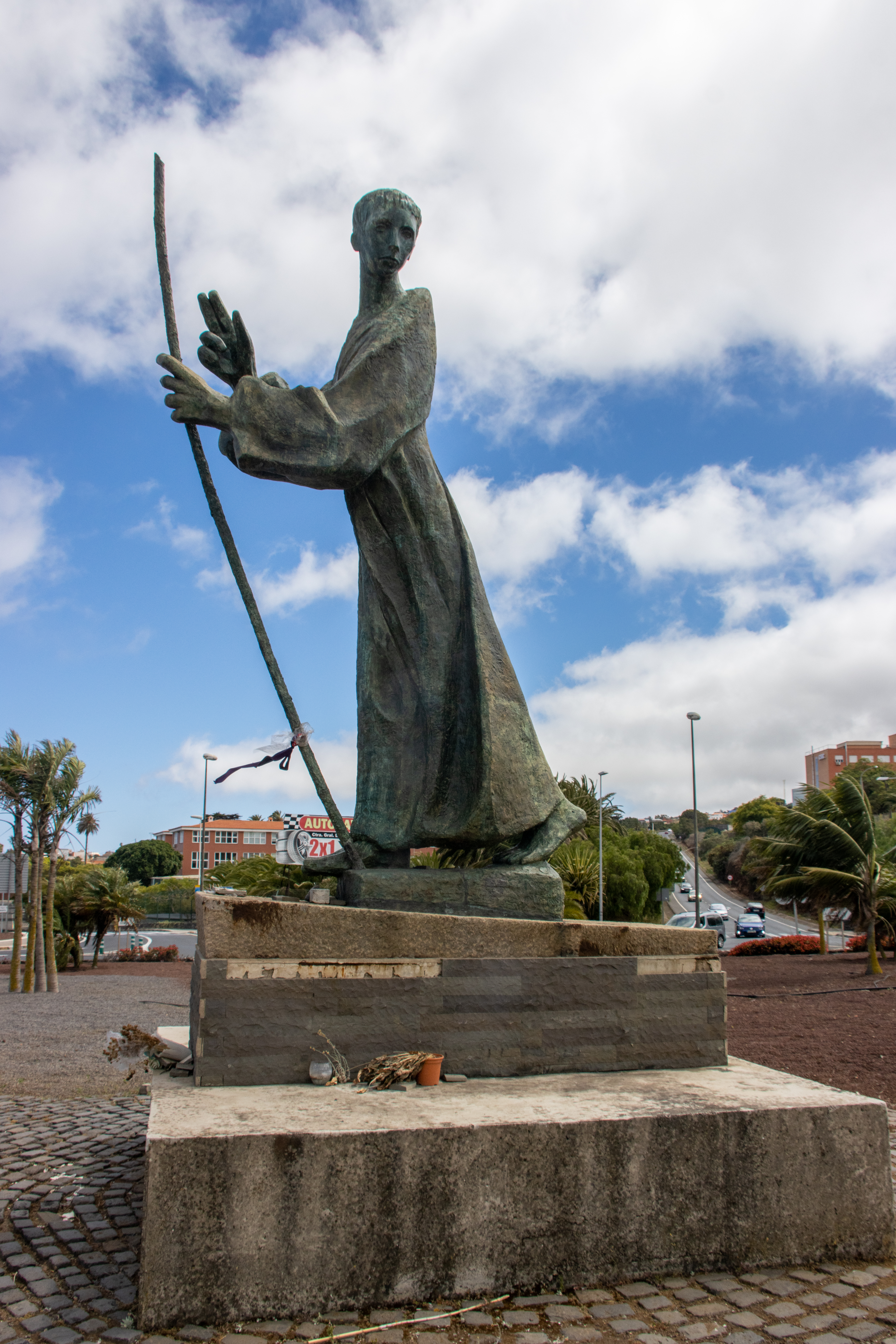
- The statue in 2020
- Location: San Cristóbal de La Laguna, Tenerife, Canary Islands
- Coordinates: 28°28′51″N 16°19′09″W
- Designer: Bruno Giorgi
- Type: statue
- Material: bronze
- Opening date: 27 November 1960
- Dedicated to: Joseph of Anchieta

The Monument to José de Anchieta in La Laguna, Tenerife, is a monumental statue of Joseph of Anchieta by Bruno Giorgi. Inaugurated in 1960, it is 5 metres tall, and is located in the square that bears its name, next to the Padre Anchieta roundabout at the entrance to the city.

== Description ==
The monumental sculpture is dedicated to Joseph of Anchieta, who was born in La Laguna in 1534, before going to Brazil as a missionary in 1553. The bronze sculpture is approximately 5 metres (16 ft) tall, and is on a 1 metre (3.3 ft) concrete pedestal. The statue's position is described as "walking towards the sea and looking at La Laguna". It is one of La Laguna's emblematic symbols.

== History ==
The creation of the monument was promoted by a pro-monument commission of the Ayuntamiento of La Laguna, at the prompting of Celso Ferreira da Cunha in the late 1950s.

The monument was created by Bruno Giorgi, and was funded by the Federal government of Brazil. Constructed in Brazil, it was moved to Tenerife in 1960 on the ocean liner Cabo de San Vicente. It was inaugurated on 27 November 1960 at the Brazil roundabout in La Laguna, popularly known as Padre Anchieta roundabout, above the Autopista TF-5. The location was chosen by the artist, and was a wide oval of grass at the time. A decade later, the TF-5 was widened due to increased traffic, and the monument was relocated.

In the 2000s, the roundabout was again reformed, with the creation of a tunnel for the TF-5 and the construction of a new roundabout on top of the tunnel. and the statue was temporarily relocated to the campus of the University of La Laguna. It was moved back to the original location on Saturday 14 July 2007, with the relocation taking around 1.5 hours. In 2013, complaints were made about the statue being hidden by flora, which was later trimmed back, and that it was not illuminated at night.

In 2014, concerns were raised by Tomás Oropesa Hernández that vehicle fumes may be corroding the statue. As of March 2021, it is possible that the monument will move again to permit additional works at the roundabout, which will change the road layout and create an elevated pedestrian walkway, to a new square to be created in the parking lot of the Faculty of Biology.

A small tactile model of the monument was made in 2020.

It was moved to the gardens of the University of La Laguna on 30 March 2022 due to the works taking place at the TF5 roundabout.

In April 2024 the sculpture was installed in the aforementioned new square next to the parking lot of the Faculty of Biology.
