= Santuário Nacional de São José de Anchieta =

Catholic church in Anchieta, Brazil

National Sanctuary of Saint Joseph of Anchieta
- Santuário Nacional de São José de Anchieta
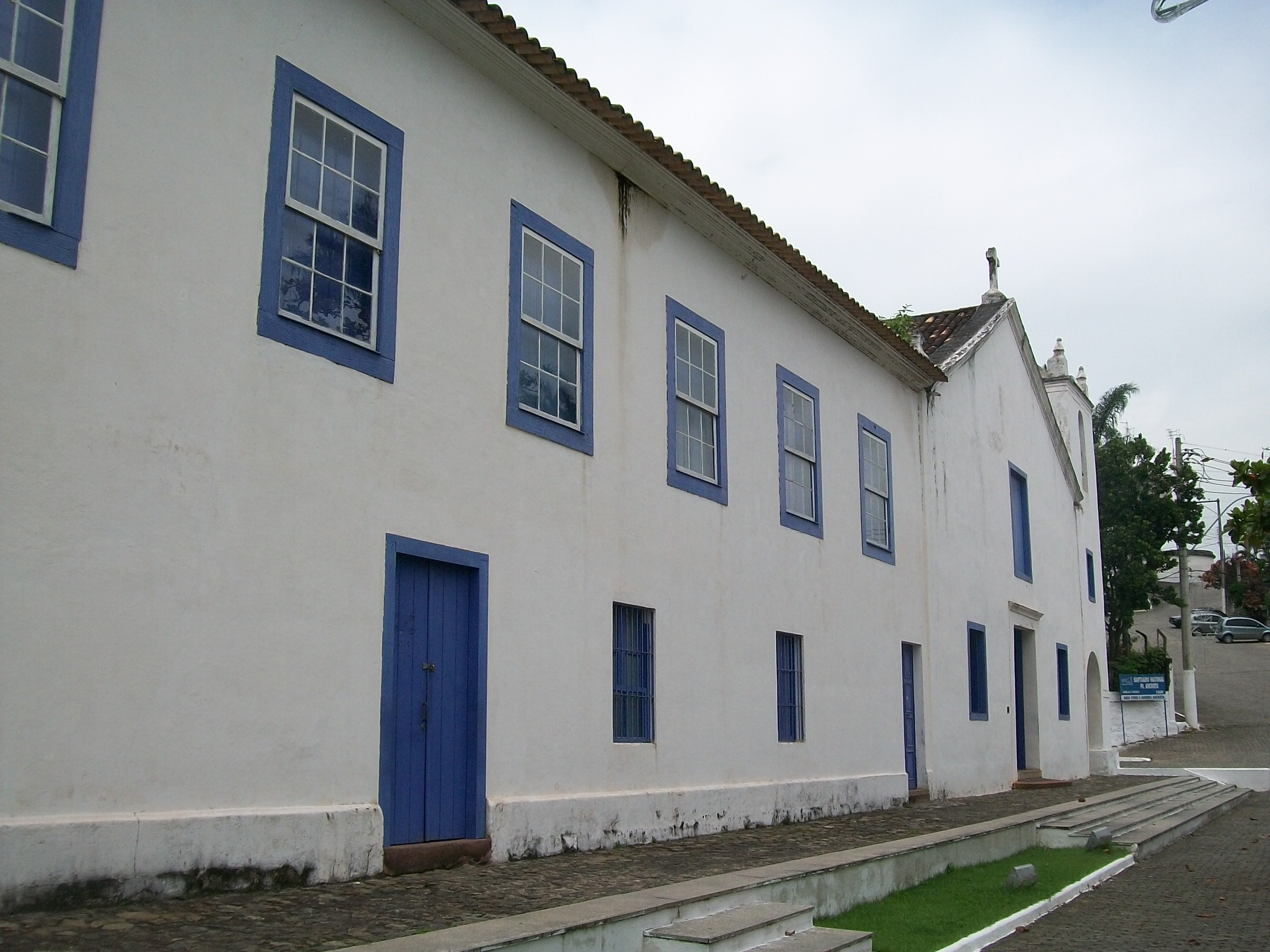
- Façade of Our Lady of the Assumption Church (Igreja Nossa Senhora da Assunção)

- Location within Brazil

Religion
- Affiliation: Catholic

Location
- Municipality: Anchieta
- State: Espírito Santo
- Country: Brazil
- Interactive map of National Sanctuary of Saint Joseph of Anchieta
- Coordinates: 20°48′20″S 40°38′50″W

Architecture
- Listed Building
- Official name: IPHAN
- Designated: September 21, 1943

The National Sanctuary of Saint Joseph of Anchieta (in Portuguese: Santuário Nacional de São José de Anchieta), formed by the Church of Our Lady of the Assumption (Igreja de Nossa Senhora da Assunção) and areas of the former Jesuit residence, is a Catholic temple located on a hillside on the Benevente River in the municipality of Anchieta, in Espírito Santo, Brazil.

The Catholic Church named the space the National Sanctuary of Saint Joseph of Anchieta due to his canonization by Pope Francis in 2014, his appointment as Brazil's co-patron saint in 2015, and because it was the place chosen by the priest to spend his last days.

In 1965, the Saint Joseph National Museum was created on the site, which preserves images, old liturgical objects from the church and objects from the former village of Reritiba.

== History ==
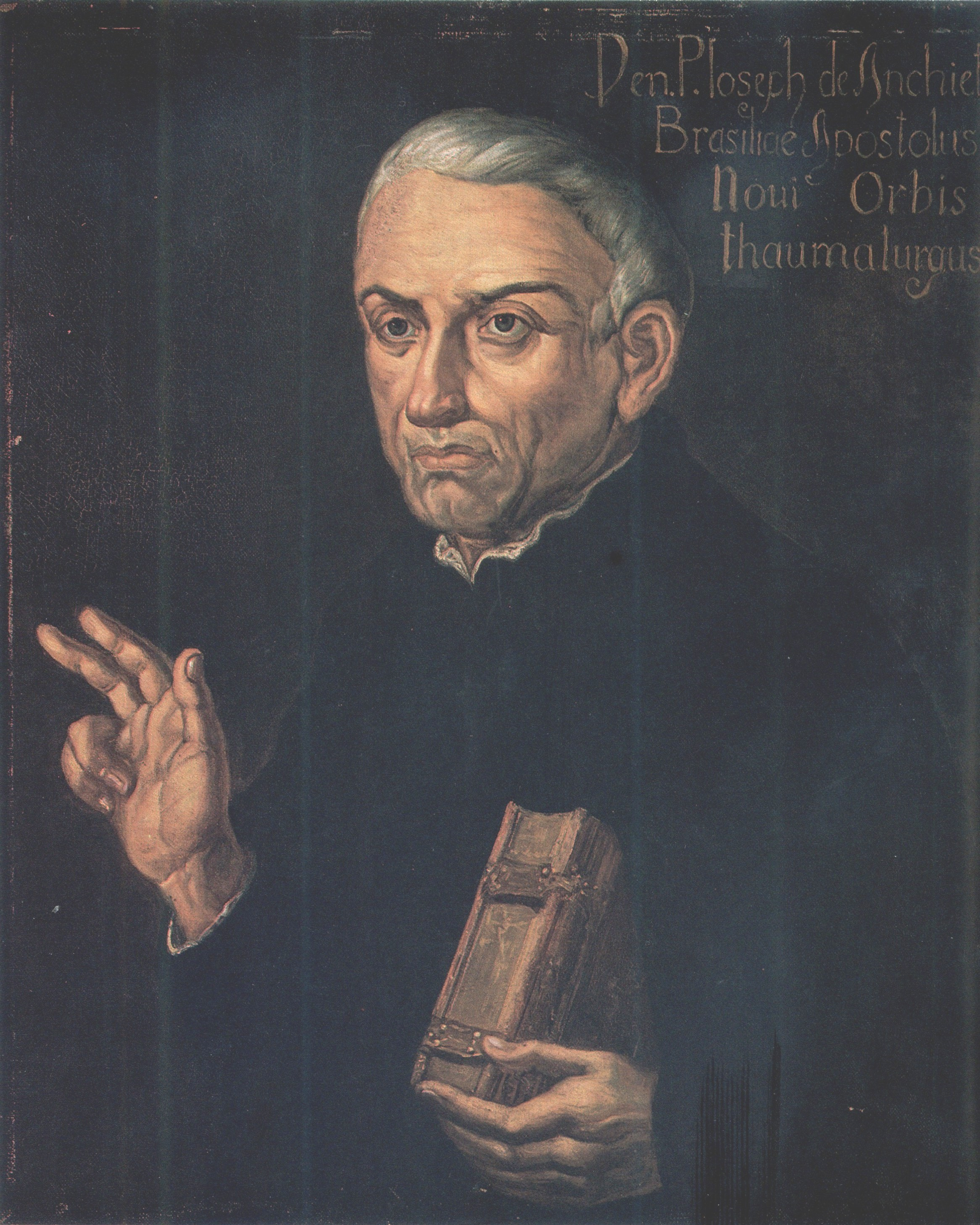
St. Joseph of Anchieta, co-patron saint of Brazil.

The original building was made in stone and lime in 1579 by Joseph of Anchieta, in the town of Reritiba, now the city of Anchieta. A heritage site of significant historical, cultural, and religious importance, it was fundamental in the process of catechizing the indigenous people of the Espírito Santo captaincy. In 1759, the village of Reritiba was elevated to the status of Vila de Benevente and during this period the complex underwent significant changes to adapt to the new reality. In 1797, the sacristy of the church was demolished after it was elevated to the category of parish church, and in 1804, the residence was adapted to serve as the town hall, public jail, courthouse, judge's quarters, and parish house. In the 19th century, the inner courtyard and part of the south and west wings were used as the town cemetery. In 1928, the residence was bought by Bishop Helvécio and returned to the Jesuits so that they could continue their evangelizing mission. On September 21, 1943, the complex was listed by the National Institute of Historic and Artistic Heritage (IPHAN) due to its importance in Brazil's history and of the Baroque imagery. In 1965, the São José de Anchieta National Museum was founded on the site. (Note: Not to be confused with the Anchieta Museum, located in Pátio do Colégio, São Paulo.)

From January 1994 to June 1997, the Anchieta Jesuit Complex Restoration Program began, which made it possible to recover the original features of the complex, as well as the archaeological surveys.

On April 24, 2015, during the 53rd General Assembly of the Episcopal Conference of Brazil (CNBB), the temple was officially declared the National Sanctuary of St. Joseph of Anchieta.
