= Casa Anchieta =

Building in Tenerife, Canary Islands

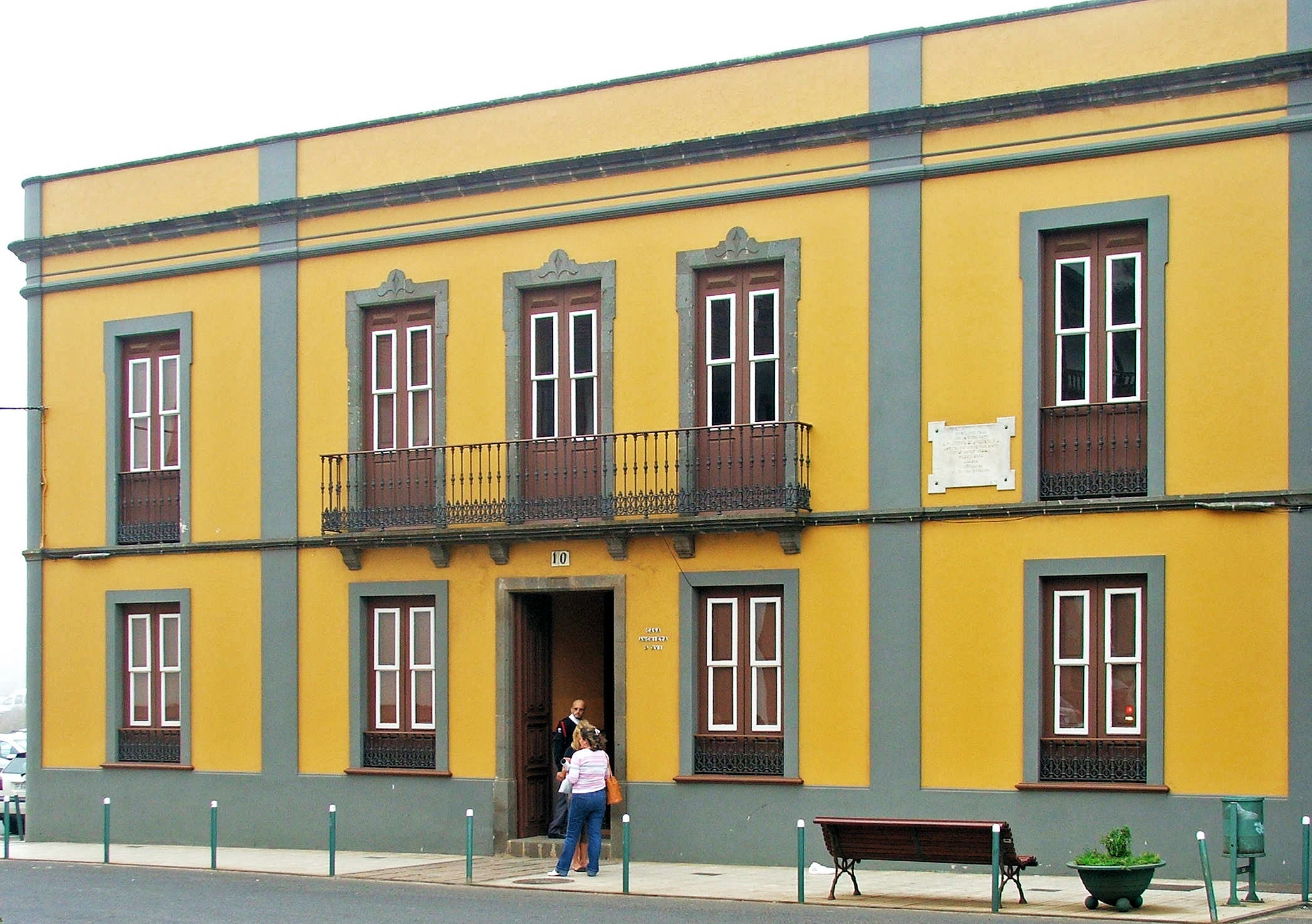

- Location within Tenerife

General information
- Location: San Cristóbal de La Laguna, Tenerife, Spain
- Coordinates: 28°29′13″N 16°18′47″W

Design and construction
- Designations: Bien de Interés Cultural (1986)

Casa Anchieta is a building in San Cristóbal de La Laguna, Tenerife, Canary Islands. Originally constructed in the 16th century, the current building dates from the 17th century with 19th-century modifications. It was the childhood home of Saint Joseph of Anchieta, after whom the building is named. In 2020 the building started to be restored, with the aim of turning it into a museum and interpretation center about José de Anchieta.

== History ==
The house is named after Joseph of Anchieta, who was born in San Cristóbal de La Laguna in 1534, and resided in the building when he was in Tenerife, before going to Brazil.

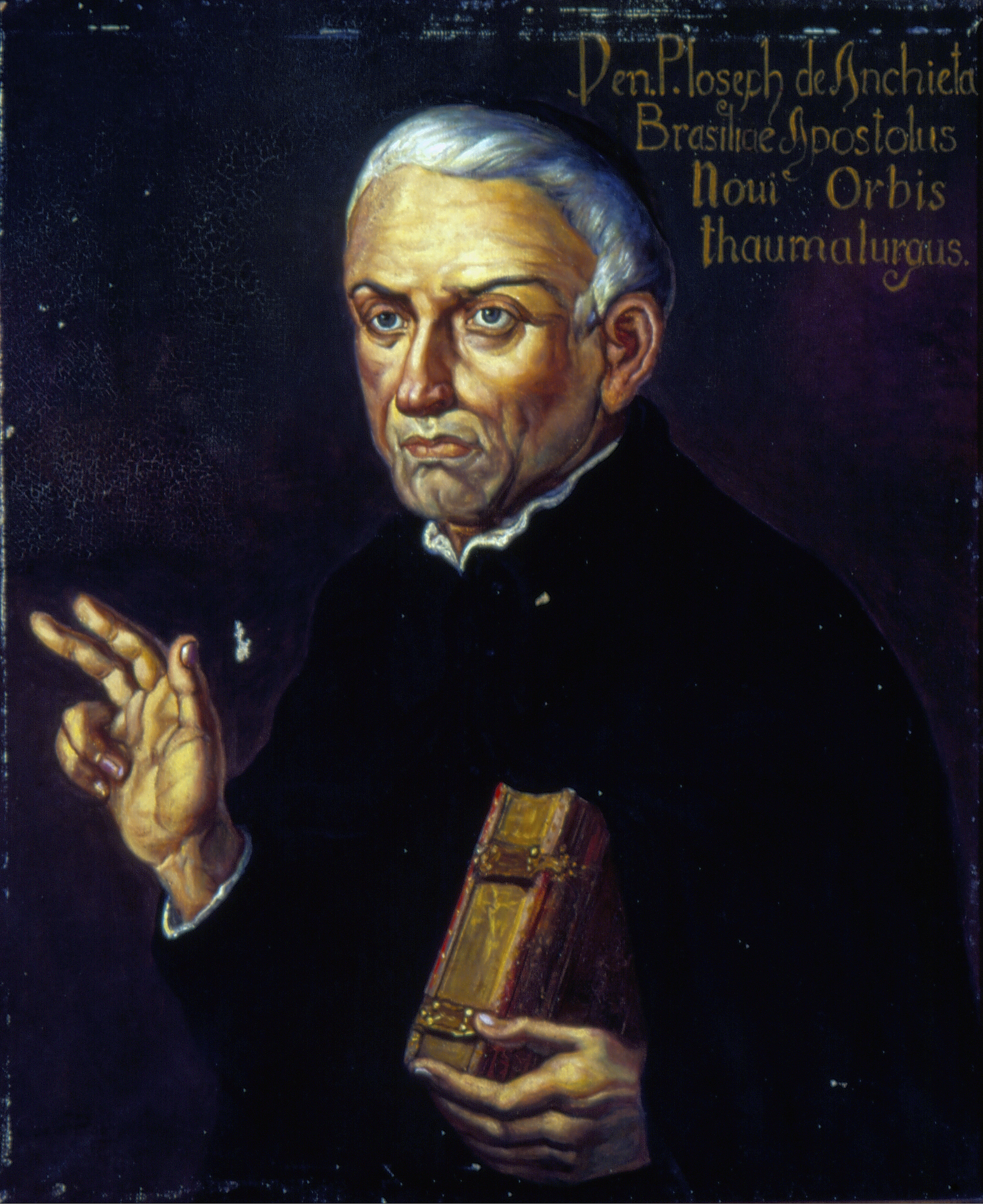
Saint Joseph of Anchieta, Jesuit missionary, saint, linguist, writer, doctor, architect, engineer, humanist and poet.

The site was initially used as an elementary school at the start of the 16th century, which was turned into a single family home. It was originally the property of Nuño Pérez. When he died, his widow Mencia Díaz de Clavijo married Juan de Anchieta, a captain and public notary, who were the parents of José de Anchieta. While José de Anchieta was not born in the house, he lived in it for the first 14 years of his life.

The current building was constructed on top of it in the 17th century by Diego Benítez de Anchieta. It was significantly renovated in the 19th century, with the main facade remodeled in 1905. It was also the residence of Manuel Verdugo, the Colegio Mayor Femenino "Virgen de la Candelaria" was located in the building in 1962, and the Escuela de Actores de Canarias was located in the building until 1987.

It was recorded as a building of cultural interest on 14 March 1986 by Decree 50/1986.

The building was restored in 2002–05 by the La Laguna City Council with the aim of creating a museum in the building. It then underwent a minor restoration in 2006 to temporarily house the Bishopric of Tenerife following a fire in the Salazar Palace until that building that was restored. From 2007 it was left abandoned and unused, except for briefly being used to store part of the municipal archive in 2015 until problems were detected in January 2016.

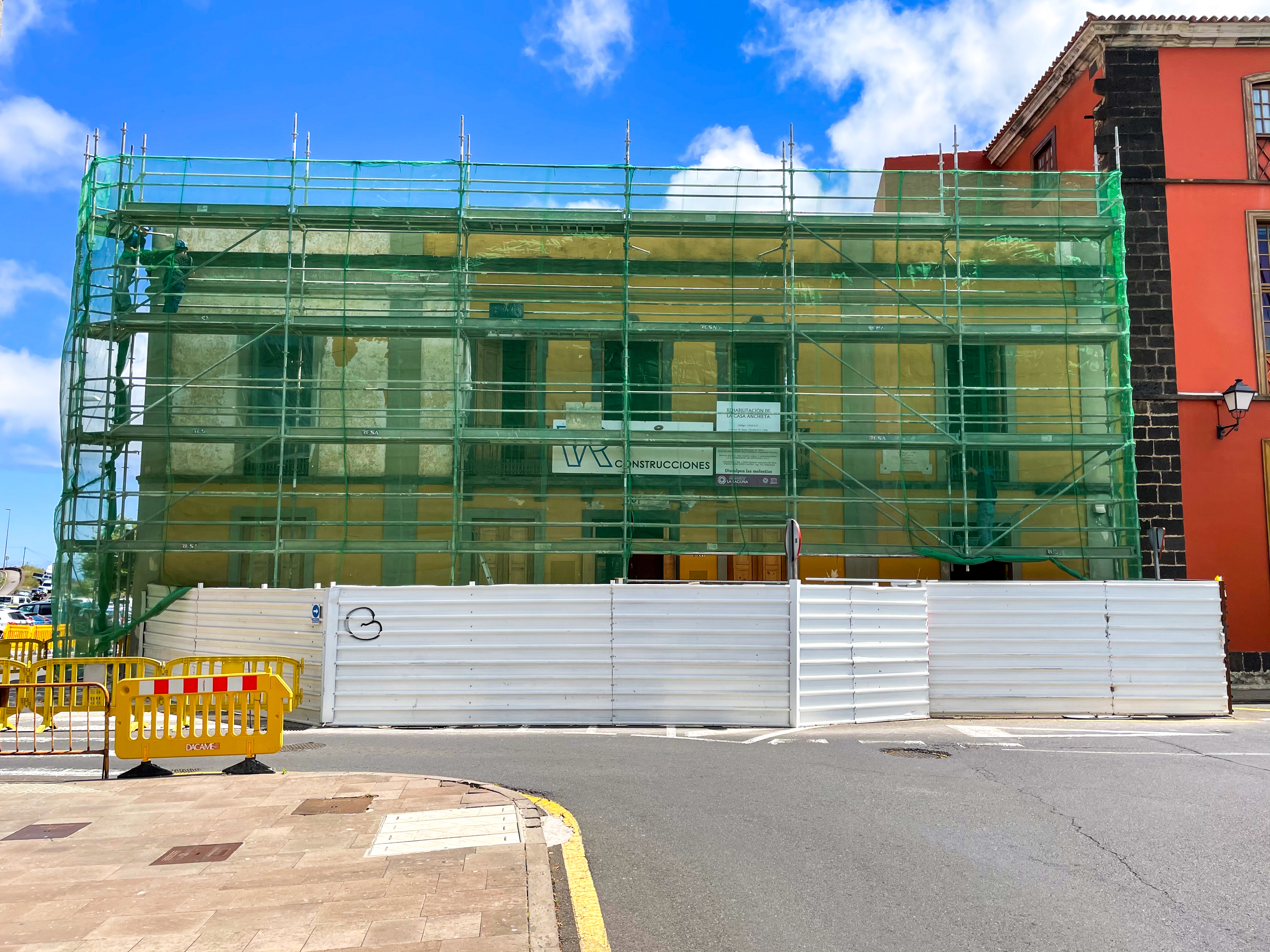
The building being restored in 2021

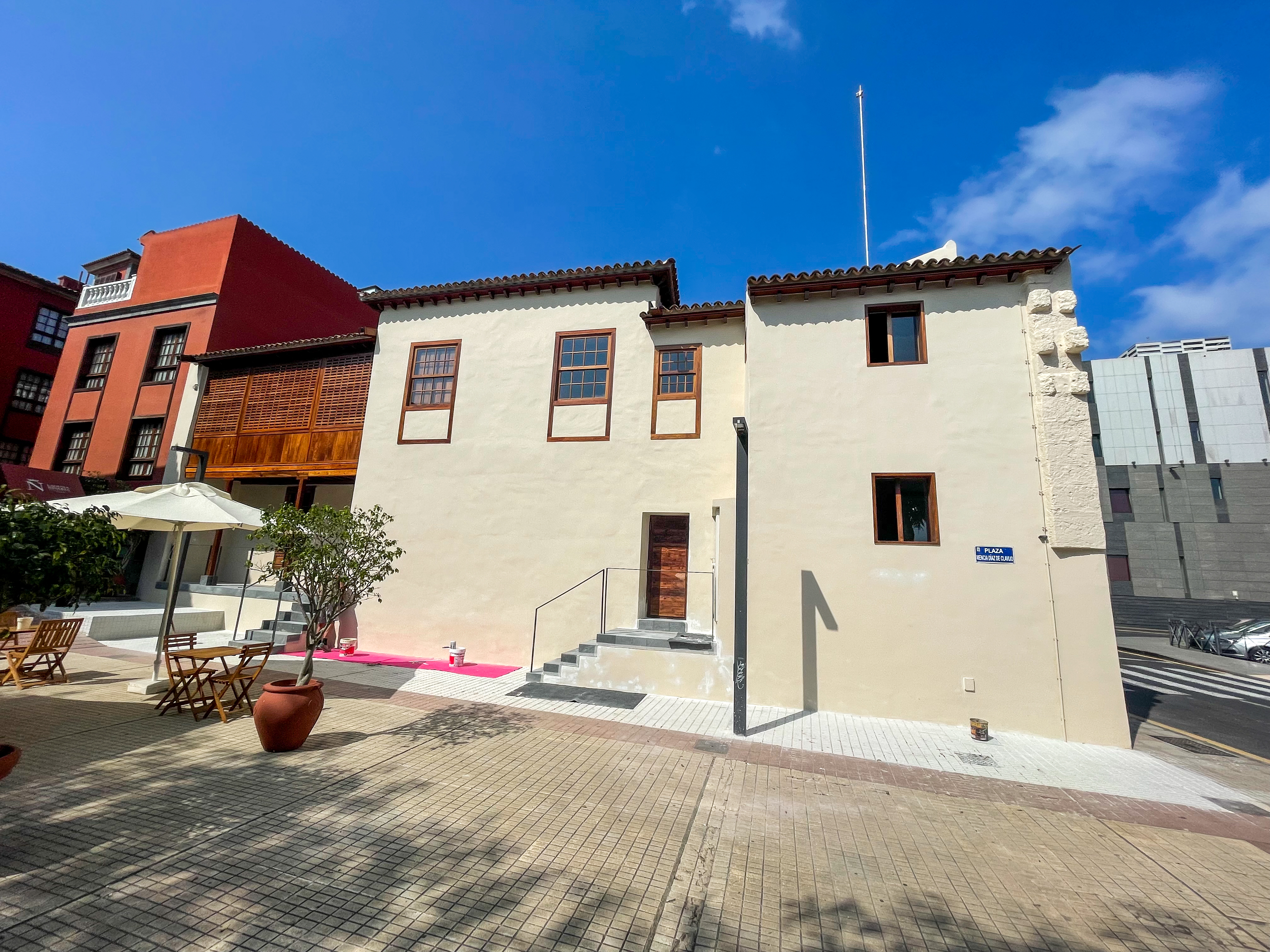
The rear of the building in 2021

The restored building in 2026

In 2020 it was announced that a renovation will take place to turn it into a museum and interpretation centre focused on José de Anchieta. The restoration work will last 7 months and cost €710,000. It will include making the building accessible to disabled people, with bathrooms on each floor and the installation of an elevator. The humidity that the building has suffered will be removed, and the internal layout revised to restore a more original layout. The work started in 2021. By July it was reported that the work was mostly complete, particularly the most sensitive parts, but the remaining work needed some changes to the restoration plan - particularly the electricity supply, the elevator installation, and telecommunications. After several delays, the work was completed in 2024.

== Description ==
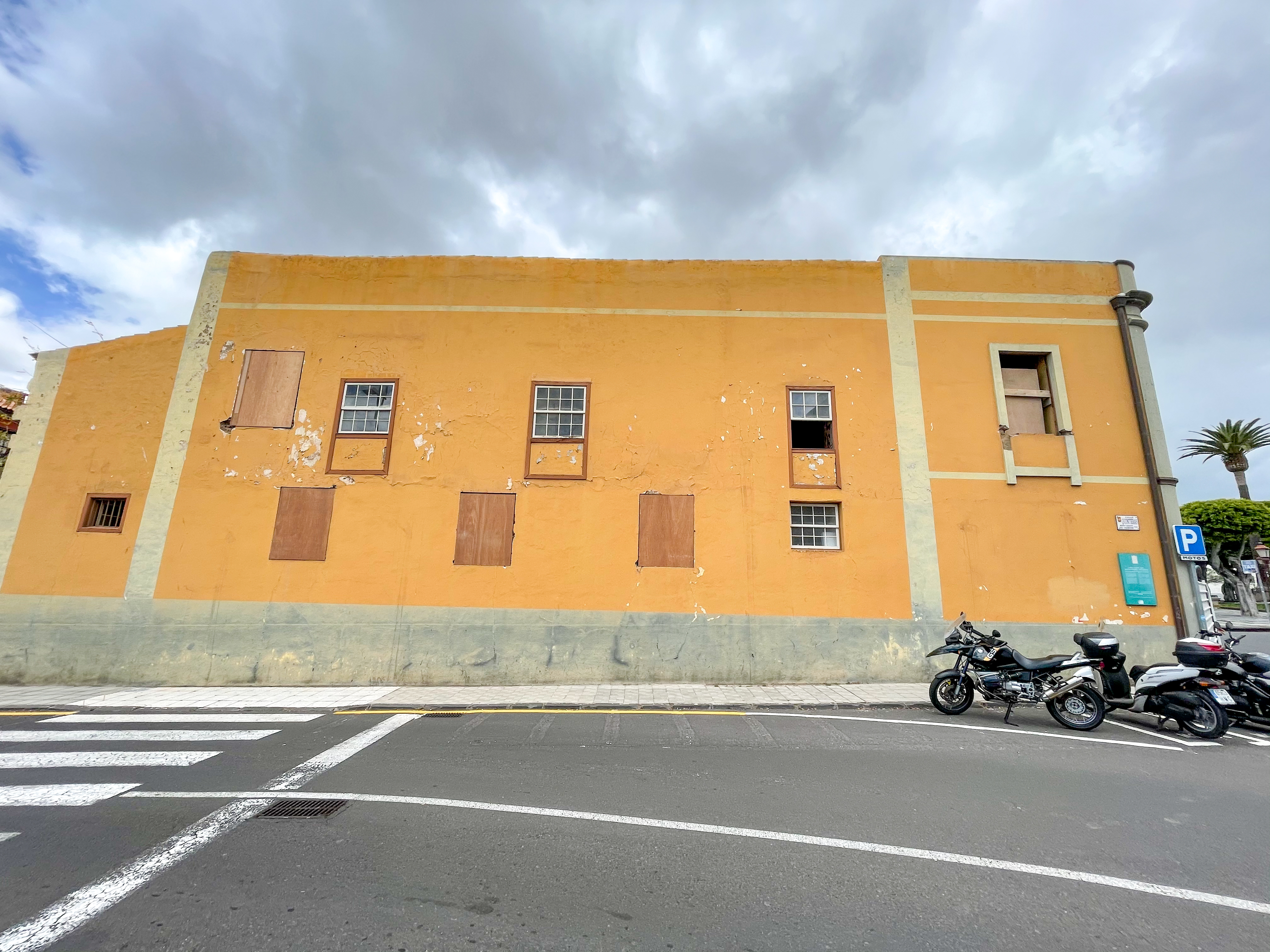
The side facade in 2021

The neo-classical building is two storeys tall, with a tiled roof. It has a central courtyard with stairs on one side. It is trapezoid-shaped, and has three facades, the main one of which (as well as the most important rooms) faces onto Plaza del Adelantado. The front facade, which was originally asymmetric, was remodeled in 1905 by Mariano Estanga and is now symmetric with a central balcony. The main door and the balcony doors are dressed with stone. Window and door sills are made of iron balustrades. The side facade faces Calle Las Quinteras, while the rear faces a small square that used to house the building's vegetable garden.

The interior was changed in the 19th and 20th centuries, but features from the 16th and 17th centuries can be seen in the walls, roof, trusses, and in the central courtyard and cellar.
