= Anchieta, Espírito Santo =

Anchieta
- Municipality
- Municipality of Anchieta
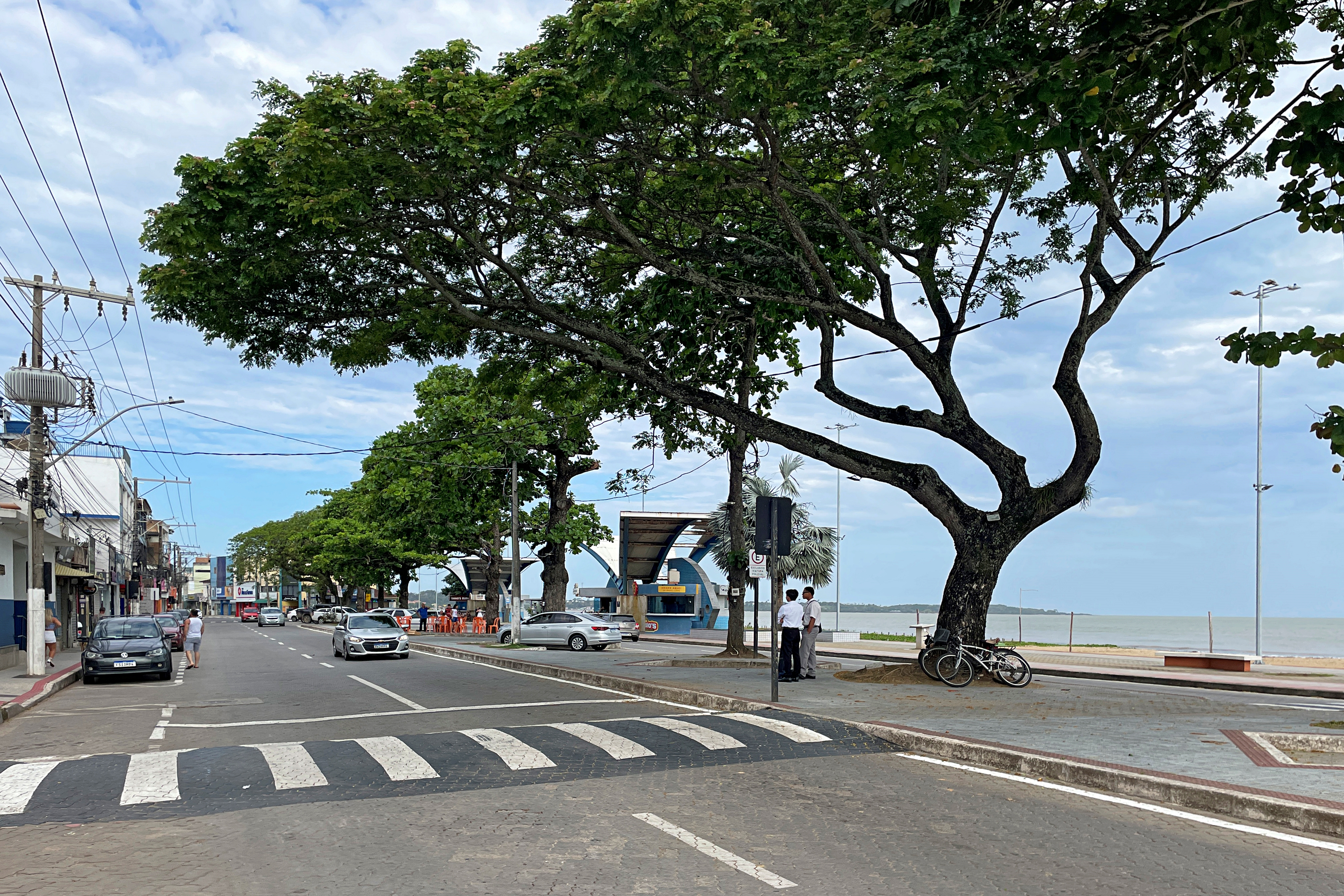
- The Carlos Lindenberg Avenue with the Central Beach on the right

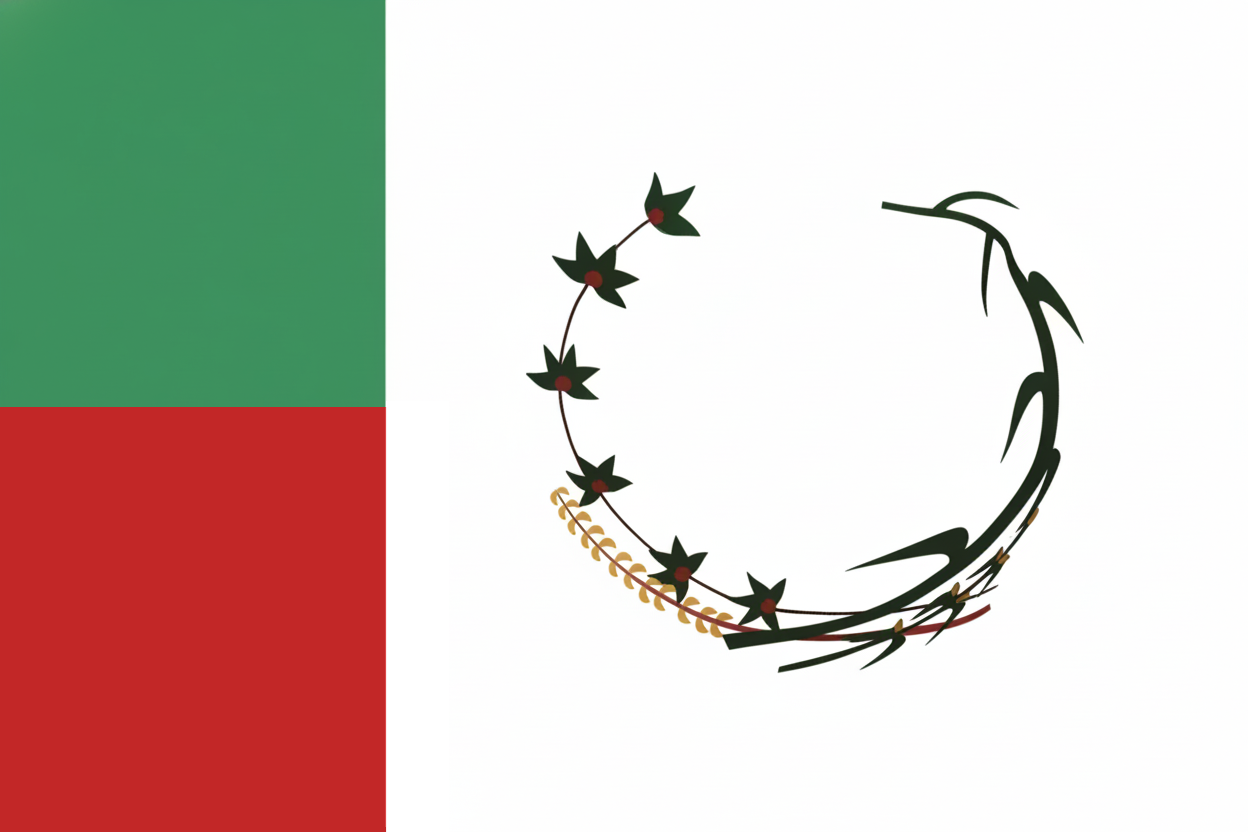
- Flag Coat of arms

- Location in Brazil
- Coordinates: 20°48′20″S 40°38′40″W
- Country: Brazil
- Region: Southeast
- State: Espírito Santo

Area
  - Total: 412 km^{2} (159 sq mi)

Population (2020)
  - Total: 29,779
  - Density: 72.3/km^{2} (187/sq mi)
- Time zone: UTC−3 (BRT)

Anchieta is a municipality in the Brazilian state of Espírito Santo. Its population was 29,779 in 2020 and its area is 412 km^{2} (159 sq mi). Its average elevation is 2 m (6.6 ft) above sea level.

Formerly known as Reritiba, the city was renamed after the Jesuit Spanish missionary and saint José de Anchieta (1534-1597).

== See also ==
- Santuário Nacional de São José de Anchieta
