= Joseph of Anchieta =

Spanish Jesuit saint and missionary

Saint Joseph of Anchieta S.J.
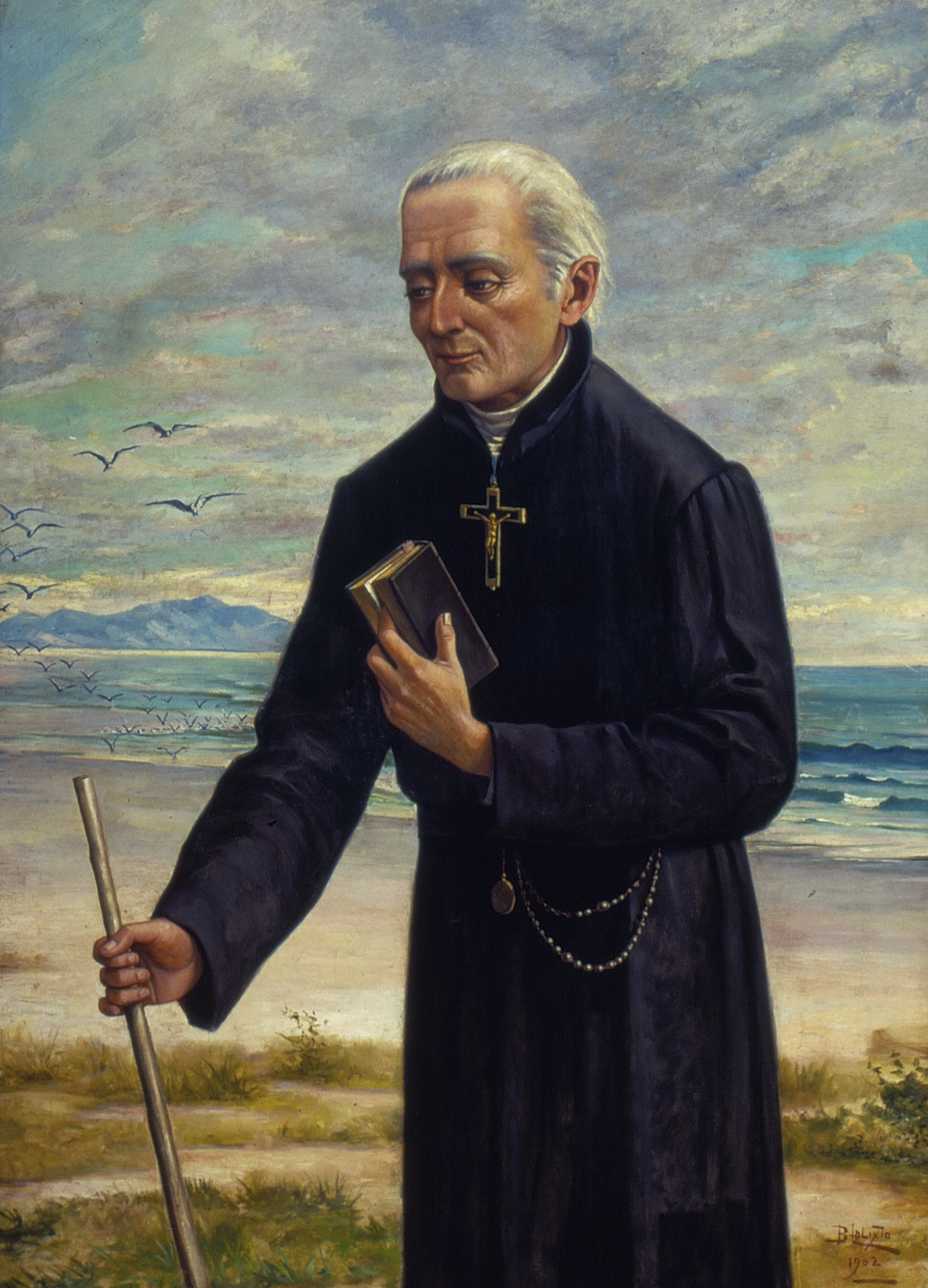
- José de Anchieta, by painter Benedito Calixto

Apostle of Brazil Priest, Missionary, Religious
- Born: 19 March 1534; San Cristóbal de La Laguna, Tenerife, Canary Islands, Spanish Empire
- Died: 9 June 1597 (aged 63); Reritiba, Espírito Santo, Governorate General of Brazil, Iberian Union
- Venerated in: Catholic Church (Brazil, Canary Islands, and the Society of Jesus)
- Beatified: 22 June 1980, Saint Peter's Square, Vatican City, by Pope John Paul II
- Canonized: 3 April 2014 (equivalent canonization), Vatican City, by Pope Francis
- Major shrine: Cathedral of San Cristóbal de La Laguna (in Canary Islands) and National Shrine of Saint José de Anchieta (in Brazil)
- Feast: 9 June
- Attributes: Gospel Book, Crucifix and Cane
- Patronage: Catechists, against animal attacks, of those who suffer scoliosis and compatrono of Brazil

José de Anchieta y Díaz de Clavijo, SJ (Joseph of Anchieta; 19 March 1534 – 9 June 1597) was a Spanish missionary to the Portuguese colony of Brazil in the second half of the 16th century. A highly influential figure in Brazil's history in the first century after its European discovery, Anchieta was one of the founders of São Paulo in 1554 and of Rio de Janeiro in 1565. He is the first playwright, the first grammarian and the first poet born in the Canary Islands, and is considered the father of Brazilian literature.

Anchieta took part in the religious instruction, evangelization, and conversion to the Catholic faith of the Indigenous population. His efforts along with those of another Jesuit missionary, Manuel da Nóbrega, at Indigenous pacification were crucial to the establishment of stable colonial settlements in the colony.

With his book Arte de gramática da língua mais usada na costa do Brasil (1595), Anchieta became the first person to provide an orthography to Old Tupi, the language most commonly spoken along the coast of Brazil.

Anchieta is familiarly known as "the Apostle of Brazil". He was canonized by Pope Francis on 3 April 2014. He was the second native of the Canary Islands, after fellow missionary Peter of Saint Joseph de Betancur, to be declared a saint by the Catholic Church. Anchieta is also considered the third saint of Brazil.

== Early life ==
Anchieta was born on 19 March 1534, in San Cristóbal de La Laguna on Tenerife in the Canary Islands, Spain, to a wealthy family. His father was João López de Anchieta, of Urrestilla a neighborhood in Azpeitia, in Gipuzkoa, Basque Country), and his mother was Mência Diaz de Clavijo y Llarena, of a noble family in the Canary Islands. He was baptized on 7 April 1534 in the Parish of Our Lady of Remedies (now La Laguna Cathedral). He lived in his family home, a building now known as Casa Anchieta, in La Laguna until he was 14 years old.

His father, Juan López de Anchieta y Zelayaran, was a landowner from Urrestilla, in the Basque Country. He had escaped to Tenerife in 1525 after participating in an unsuccessful rebellion against the Emperor Charles V. Through him, Anchieta was related to Ignatius of Loyola, founder of the Society of Jesus. His mother was Mencia Díaz de Clavijo y Llarena, a descendant of Castilian conquerors of Tenerife. Mencia was the daughter of Sebastián de Llarena, a Jew who had converted to Christianity, from the kingdom of Castile, and his wife, descendant of the Guanche nobility.

At the age of 14, Anchieta went to study in Portugal at the Royal College of Arts in Coimbra. He was intensely religious and felt he had a vocation to the priesthood. He sought admission to the Jesuit College of the University of Coimbra and was accepted into the Jesuits on 1 May 1551, at the age of 17. While a novice, he nearly ruined his health by his excessive austerity. He had an injury to the spine that made him nearly a hunchback. He learned to write Portuguese and Latin, in addition to Spanish.

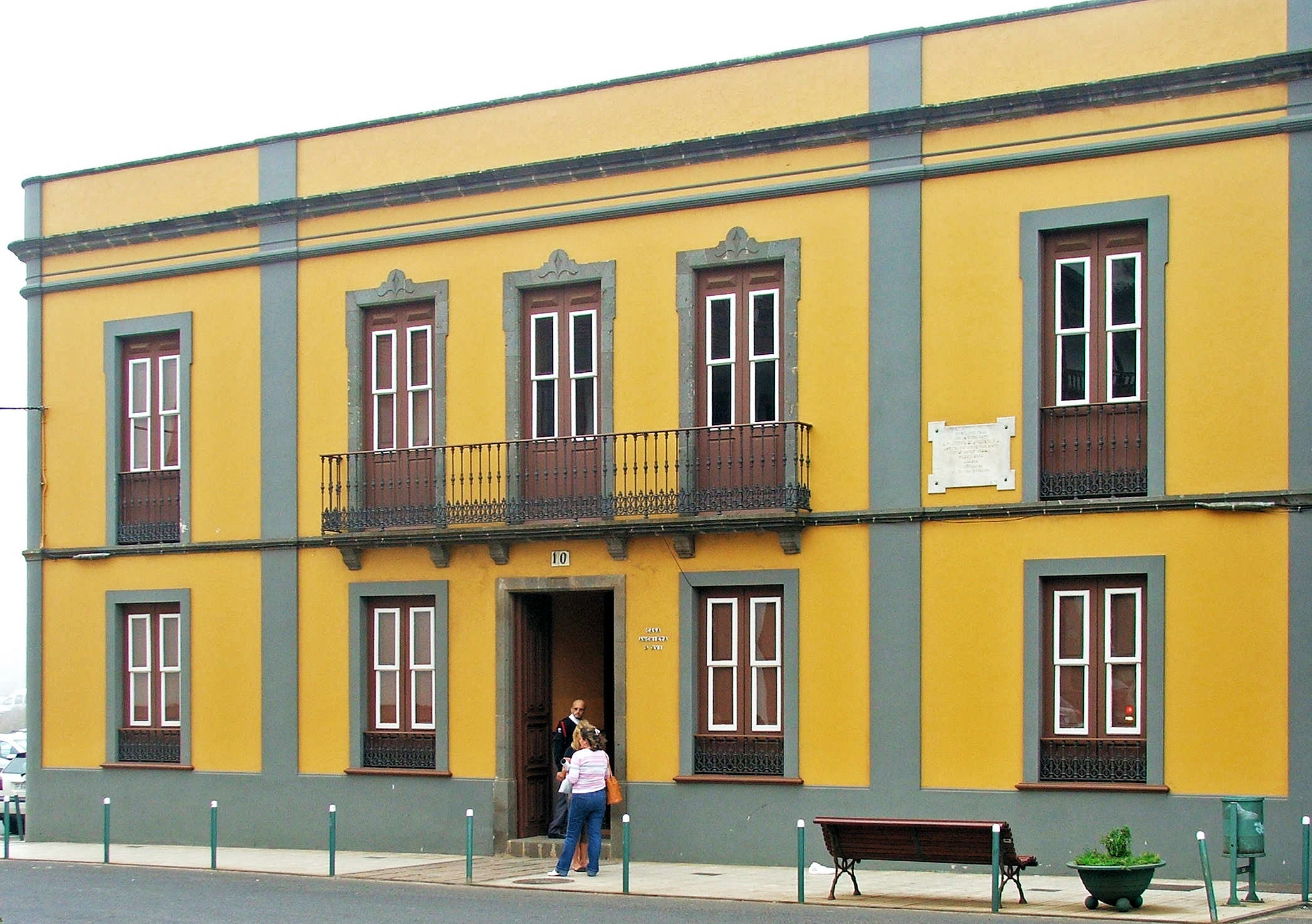
House of José de Anchieta in San Cristóbal de La Laguna (Tenerife)

== Missionary in Brazil ==
In 1553, the Jesuits included Anchieta among the third group of their members sent to the Portuguese colony of Brazil, believing that the climate would improve his health. After a perilous journey and a shipwreck, Anchieta and his small group of survivors arrived in São Vicente. It was the first village to have been founded by the Portuguese in Brazil. There he made his first contact with the Tapuia Indians living in the region.

In late 1553, Manuel da Nóbrega, the first Provincial of the Jesuits in Brazil, sent 13 Jesuits including Anchieta to climb the Serra do Mar to a plateau along the Tietê River that the Indians called piratininga (from Tupi pirá "fish" + tining "dry" – according to Anchieta, more than 12,000 fish could be found drying along the Tietê River floodplains after one of its customary floods).

There the Jesuits established a small missionary settlement and celebrated Mass for the first time on 25 January 1554, date of the conversion of Saint Paul, according to tradition. That date is now celebrated as the founding of São Paulo. Anchieta and his Jesuit colleagues began their efforts to instruct the native people in the rudiments of Christianity and convert them, while also introducing basic education in other subjects. He taught Latin to the Indians, began to learn their language, Old Tupi, and started compiling a dictionary and a grammar. Their mission settlement, the Jesuit College of São Paulo of Piratininga, soon developed into a small population center.

Anchieta and Nóbrega had long opposed the way the Portuguese colonists were treating the Indians and had a serious conflict about it with Duarte da Costa. He served as second Governor-General of Brazil from 1553 to 1558. The Jesuits nevertheless supported the Portuguese against their French rivals in establishing claims to Brazil. They welcomed the support of Portuguese authorities against the Huguenot Protestants whom the French at times welcomed to their settlements.

The two Jesuits perceived the French colony as a generally Protestant enterprise, ignoring its Catholic components and making no distinction between Lutherans and Calvinists. Anchieta recognized that violence could be necessary to create the conditions for evangelizing the indigenous inhabitants. He later praised the colony's third Governor General, Mem de Sá (1500–1572), for what he accomplished in eliminating cannibalism, even though it was done by killing large numbers of Amerindians.

Due to the systematic killings and ransacking of their villages by Portuguese colonists, together with attempts to enslave them, the Indian tribes along the coast of the present-day states of São Paulo, Rio de Janeiro and Espírito Santo rebelled and formed an alliance, the Tamoyo Confederation. They allied with the French colonists who had settled in Guanabara Bay in 1555 under the command of Vice-Admiral Nicolas Durand de Villegaignon.

The conflict was brutal and at once international and inter-religious. In one instance the Portuguese hanged ten Frenchmen in an attempt to intimidate their enemies into submission. In another in 1557, a Protestant named Jacques le Balleur was put to death. By some accounts, Anchieta helped the executioner carry out the sentence, though the facts are much disputed.

The Tamoyo Confederation attacked São Paulo several times between 1562 and 1564 without success. Anchieta and Nóbrega initiated peace negotiations with the Tamoyo in the village of Iperoig in modern Ubatuba on the northern coast of São Paulo state. Anchieta's skill with the Tupi language was crucial in these efforts. After many incidents and the near massacre of Anchieta and Nóbrega by the Indians, they finally succeeded in gaining the Indians' confidence. Peace was established between the Tamoyo and Tupiniquim nations and the Portuguese.

Portuguese-French hostilities were renewed in 1565 when Estácio de Sá, a nephew of the new Governor-General of Brazil, Mem de Sá, was ordered to expel the French colonists. With the support of Anchieta and Nóbrega, he departed with an army from São Vicente and founded the ramparts of Rio de Janeiro at the foot of Pão de Açúcar. Anchieta was with him and participated in a number of battles between the Portuguese and the French, each side supported by their Indian allies. He acted as a surgeon and interpreter. He also reported back to the governor-general's headquarters in Salvador, Bahia. Anchieta participated in the final victorious battle against the French in 1567.

After the peace settlement, a Jesuit college was founded in Rio under the direction of Nóbrega. Anchieta was invited to remain and succeeded him upon his death in 1570. Despite his frailty and ill health, and the rigors of slow travel by foot and ship, over the next ten years Anchieta traveled extensively among Rio de Janeiro, Bahia, Espírito Santo and São Paulo, consolidating the Jesuit mission in Brazil. In 1577 the fourth superior general of the Jesuits, Everard Mercurian, appointed Anchieta as provincial superior of the order's members in Brazil.

As his health worsened, Anchieta requested relief from his duties in 1591. He died in Brazil on 9 June 1597, at Reritiba, Espírito Santo, a municipality now called Anchieta, in his memory.

== Works ==
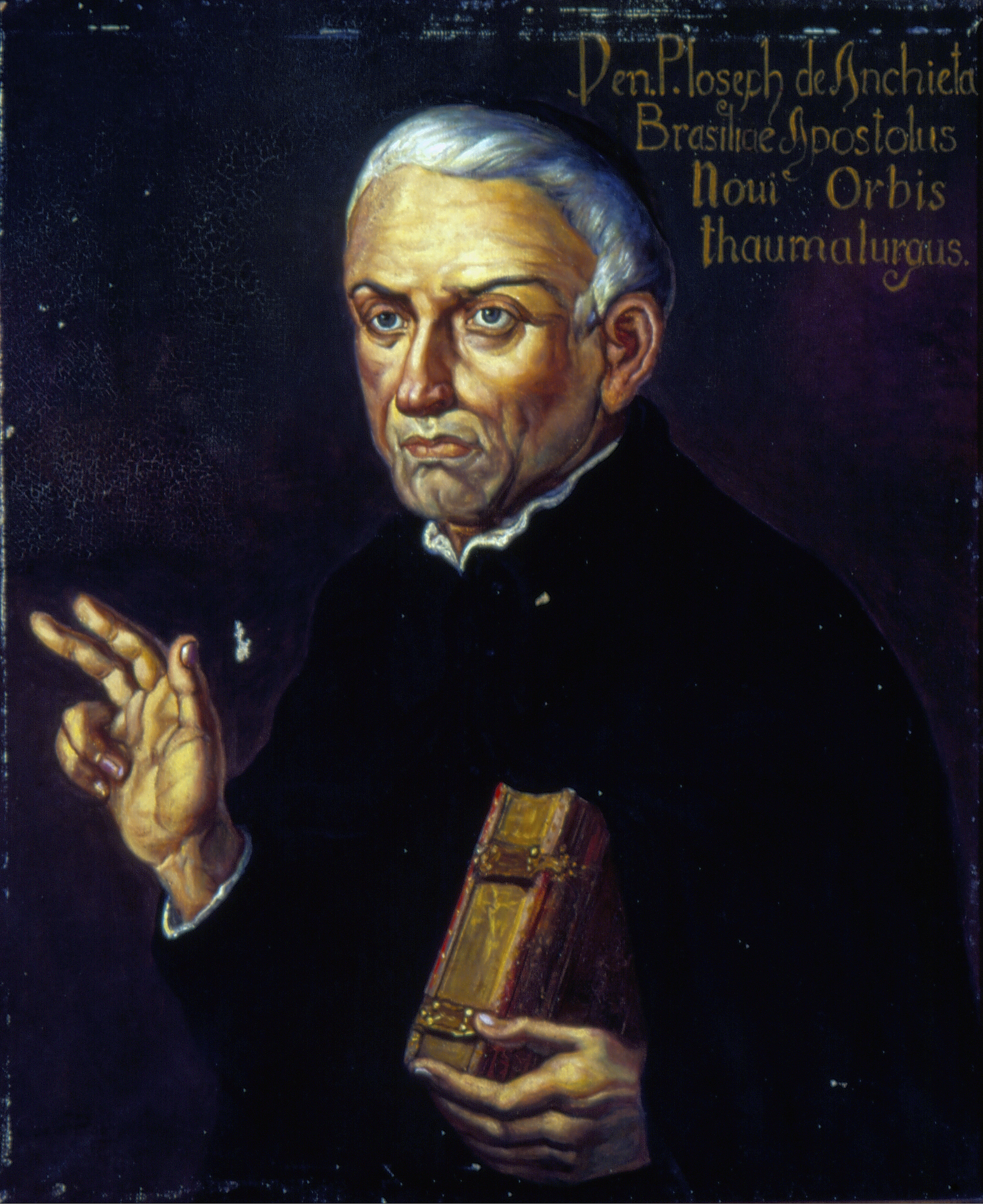
Portrait by Oscar Pereira da Silva

In the tradition of Jesuits, Anchieta was a prolific rapporteur, communicating by letters to his superiors. His reports establish him as an ethnographer, though he focused on Amerindian behavior that did not follow European norms, such as their choice of marriage partners, cannibalism, and the role of sorcerers. His detailed testimony with respect to cannibalism is often cited by anthropologists. He explained, for example, that the Amerindians "believe that true kinship comes from the side of the fathers, who are the agents, and ... that the mothers are nothing more than bags in which the children grow" and therefore treat the children of a captured female and a member of their tribe with respect but sometimes eat the children of a captured male and a female member of their own tribe. He detailed the practice of polygamy and, because it had produced dense networks of interrelations, advocated easing the church's consanguinity rules to allow all but brothers and sisters to marry.

His letters were the first of his works to be published. While the original versions, written in Spanish or Portuguese, are preserved in the Archivum Romanum Societatis Iesu, some were translated into Italian and included in the collection Nuovi avisi dell’Indie di Portogallo, published in Venice as early as 1562. The first Latin translation of one of Anchieta’s letters appeared in 1569 in a work by the Italian polymath Giulio Gabrielli di Gubbio, under the title Epistola de rebus indicis. Notably, Latin translations contributed to the wider circulation and dissemination of Anchieta’s writings, making them accessible to a broader European readership.

Anchieta was a pioneer in transcribing the Old Tupi language and authored the first published work on that language, a "pathbreaking" grammar, Arte de gramática da língua mais usada na costa do Brasil, written in 1555 and published in 1595. According to one assessment, "His grammar and dictionary still rank among the best ever produced of a Brazilian language, nearly 500 years later.... Anchieta was a dedicated linguist whose work can be considered the beginning of Amazonian linguistics (indeed it would not be stretching matters too far to call his work the beginning of linguistics in the Americas)." His written works in the indigenous language span theology, religious instruction, theater and poetry.

He was also a historian, author of a biography of Mem de Sá. Composed of hexameters, De Gestis Mendi de Saa is the first epic about the Americas. It presents de Sá as "a Christian Ulysses determined to oust Satan" who "presides ... over hordes of demonic Amerindians, creatures devoted to dismembering bodies". With the arrival of the Jesuits, "the Cross expels demons" and "shamans lose preternatural power as they move from the wilderness into the civilized missions". His other major poem was De Beata Virgine Dei Matre, a poem to the Virgin Mary. Tradition holds that Anchieta composed it while in captivity at Iperoig in 1563 by writing verses in the wet sand of the beach and memorizing each day's lines so that upon his release he could write its 4,900 verses on paper in their entirety.

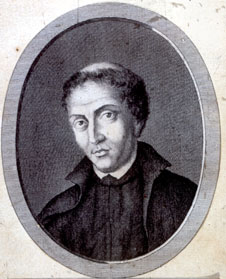
Anchieta in an 1807 engraving

His dramas, written in a combination of Tupi, Portuguese, Spanish, and Latin, were not meant for the stage but for performance by local amateurs in village squares and churchyards. They were traditional in form, written in verse with five-line stanzas, a literary form known as the auto, a Portuguese devotional drama, following the tradition the Jesuits had developed of using the theater first in classrooms and then for popular instruction. Casts were all male, both native and European, and both groups were meant to learn from the dramas' instruction in Christian morals. They were written for special occasions like a saint's feast day or to mark the arrival of relics in the colony. Scholars have noted that they contain considerable "contextual information", that is references to local events such as village rivalries. For example, Amerindian cannibalism is juxtaposed with the roasting of Lawrence of Rome. Few of his plays survive, but those that do have been praised, despite being crafted for a local audience with a didactic purpose, for their "remarkable feeling for spectacle, calling for the use of body paint, native costumes, song and dance, fights, torches, and processions". A performance might even call for cannon fire from a nearby ship, though the plays were typically "short on action and long on explanations of doctrine" and characters fall clearly into positive and negative types. Anchieta's "auto da pregação universel" of 1567 and published in 1672 is the first dramatic text in Brazilian letters.

As a keen naturalist, he described several new plants and animals among the novelties of Brazil's wildlife and geography.

His detailed reports have proven to be important for understanding the beliefs, manners, and customs of the native peoples and European settlers of the sixteenth century.

He was also an excellent surgeon and physician.

His manuscripts were gathered from archives in Portugal and Brazil in the 1730s as part of the process for his beatification and deposited in Rome. His works have been published as Cartas, Informações, Fragmentos Históricos e Sermões (Letters, Reports, Historical Fragments and Sermons).

== Legacy ==
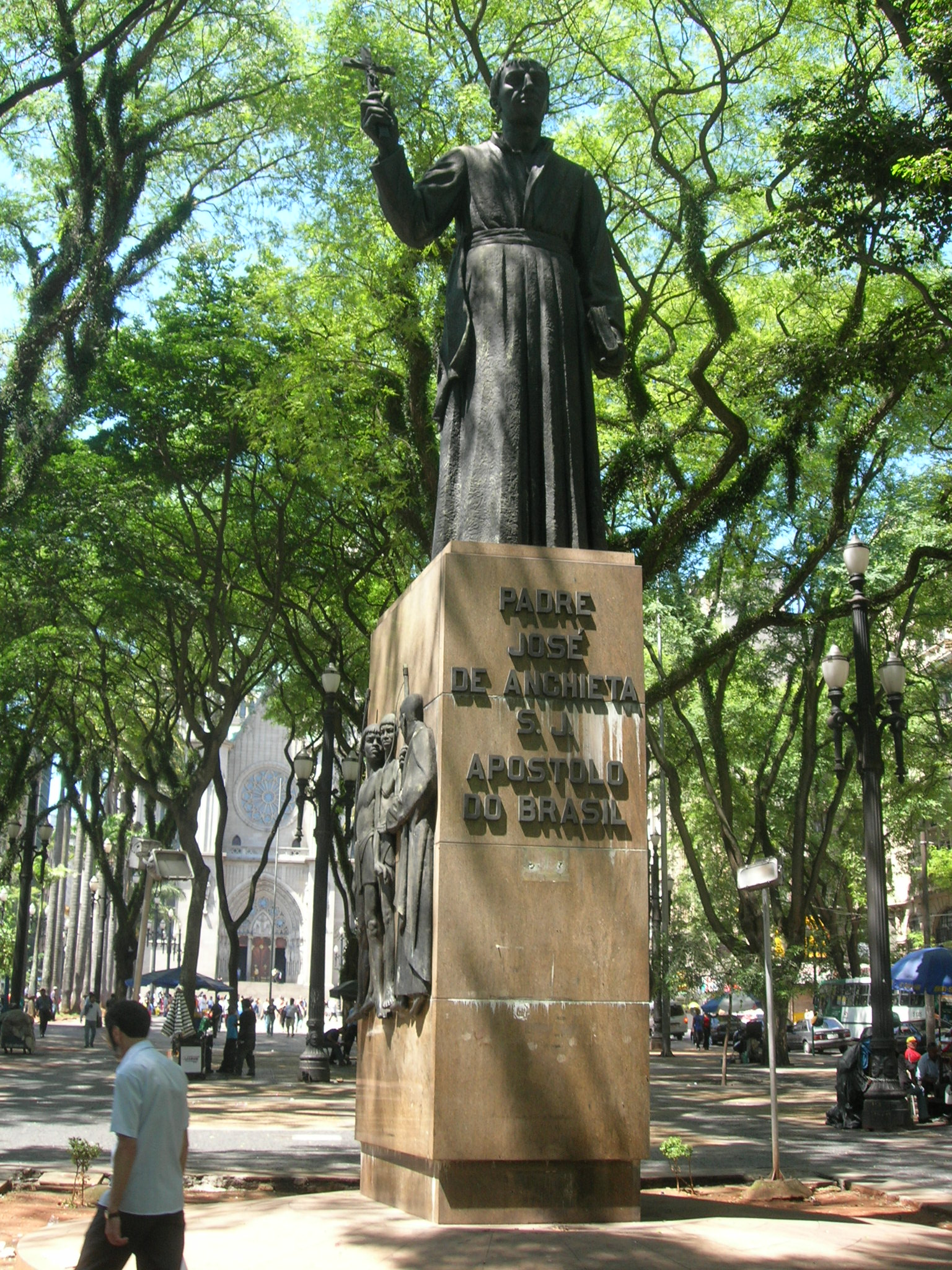
Statue of José de Anchieta by Heitor Usai in Praça da Sé, São Paulo

José de Anchieta is celebrated as the founder of Brazilian letters and, with Nóbrega, Apostle of Brazil. He has given his name to two cities, Anchieta, in the State of Espírito Santo (formerly called Reritiba, the place where he died), and Anchieta, in the state of Santa Catarina, as well as many other places, roads, institutions, hospitals, and schools. The French botanist A.St.-Hil., who explored Brasil in the 19th century, named a climbing vine of the Violaceae family for the late Jesuit: Anchietea.

In 1965, the Spanish postal service issued a stamp with the image of Anchieta, in a series called "Los Forjadores de América".

Ney Latorraca starred in the Brazilian biographical film, Anchieta, José do Brasil, which was released in 1977.

=== Veneration ===
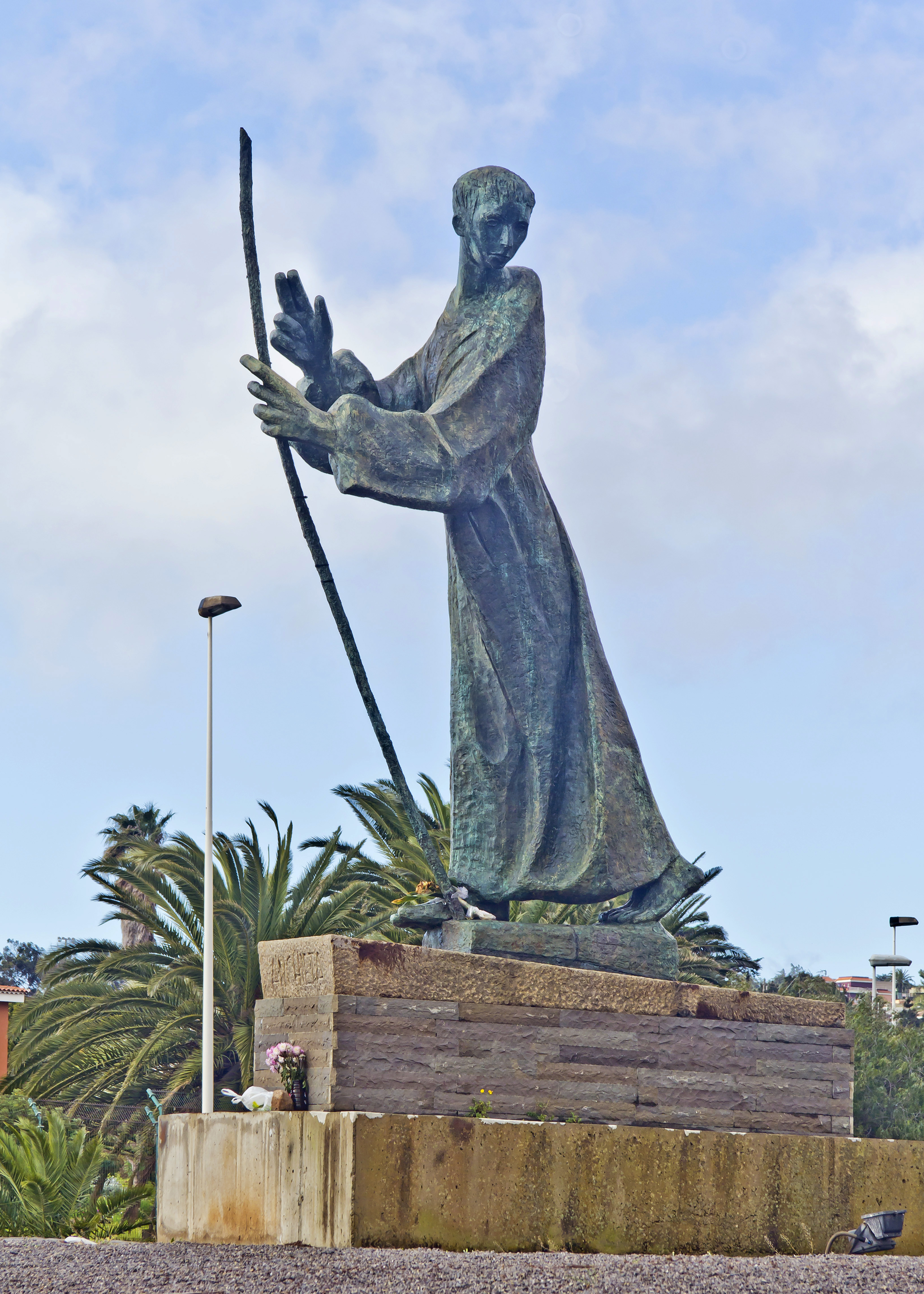
Monument to José de Anchieta in San Cristóbal de La Laguna, Tenerife

Anchieta's cause was formally opened on 22 June 1624, granting him the title of Servant of God. His spiritual writings were approved by theologians on 11 December 1734, and Pope Benedict XI declared him Venerable on 10 August 1736.

When beatified by Pope John Paul II in 1980, Anchieta acquired the title "Blessed José de Anchieta." Pope Francis announced his canonization as a saint on 3 April 2014. The announcement was first communicated to three priests from the Canary Islands (hometown of Anchieta) who attended the Mass of the Pope in his residence in Santa Marta, who communicated it to the confessed pedophile abuser Bishop of Tenerife, Bernardo Álvarez Afonso.

He used a process known as equivalent canonization that dispenses with the standard judicial procedures and ceremonies in the case of someone long venerated. Anchieta was the first Spaniard canonized by Pope Francis.

During and after his life, José de Anchieta was considered almost a supernatural being. Many legends formed around him, such as that he once preached to and calmed an attacking jaguar. To this day, a popular devotion holds that praying to Anchieta protects against animal attacks.

José de Anchieta is highly revered in the Canary Islands. A bronze statue by Brazilian artist Bruno Giorgi in the city of San Cristóbal de La Laguna depicts José de Anchieta departing for Portugal. It was a gift from the Government of Brazil to Anchieta's hometown, where a wooden image of him is also venerated in the Cathedral of La Laguna and carried in procession through the streets every 9 June. In the Basilica of Our Lady of Candelaria (patron saint of the Canary Islands), there is a painting of José de Anchieta founding the city of São Paulo. In 1997, a biographical comic book was published.

In his message to migrants sheltered at the Las Raíces center in Tenerife during his 2026 apostolic journey to Spain, Pope Leo XIV reminded them of the two Canarian saints, José de Anchieta and Peter of Saint Joseph de Betancur, as two migrants who embarked on an unknown journey to proclaim the Gospel in the Americas, knowing how to give what they had and also embrace the new experiences offered to them. During the Pope's farewell Mass in Santa Cruz de Tenerife, relics of both saints were displayed on the altar.

== Patronage ==
José de Anchieta is the patron saint and model of catechists. He was also declared by Pope Benedict XVI as one of the thirteen Intercessors of the World Youth Day 2013, held in Rio de Janeiro.

In April 2015 he was declared by the National Conference of Bishops of Brazil a copatron of Brazil, whose patron saint is Our Lady of Aparecida.

== Shrines in his honor ==
The main shrines dedicated to Saint José de Anchieta in Brazil and the Canary Islands are those that are directly related to his life:

- Spain (Canary Islands): In the city of San Cristóbal de La Laguna, his place of birth, the main diocesan shrine is the Cathedral of San Cristóbal de La Laguna, where he was baptized in 1534 and where his image is venerated. Each 9 June in this city flowers are strewn at the large bronze statue of the saint and a solemn Mass is held in the cathedral with the Bishop of Tenerife presiding, followed by a procession with his image through the streets to his birthplace, where flowers are again strewn.
- Brazil: The National Shrine of San José de Anchieta is located in the town of Reritiba (now called Anchieta) in the state of Espírito Santo. The sanctuary has an important museum of sacred art and is built in the place where he lived the last years of his life and died. Here the national holiday dedicated to the saint is celebrated with pilgrimages of faithful from throughout Brazil. Following the declaration of Anchieta as copatron of Brazil in 2015, the church was declared a National Shrine.

== See also ==
- List of saints of the Canary Islands
- Jesuit Reductions
- Colonial Brazil
- France Antarctique
