= Anchieta, Santa Catarina =

Coordinates: 26°32′02″S 53°19′51″W

- Municipality
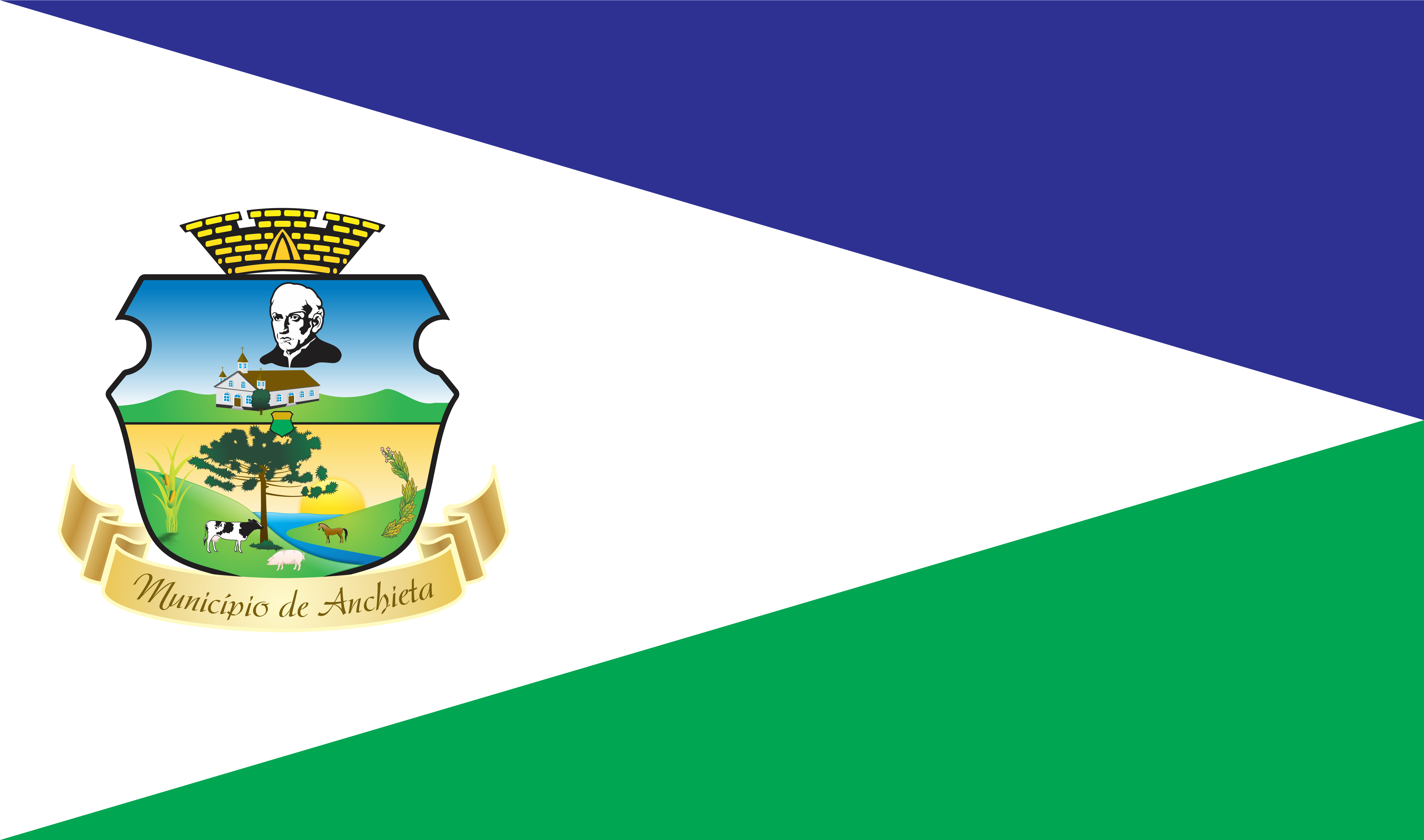
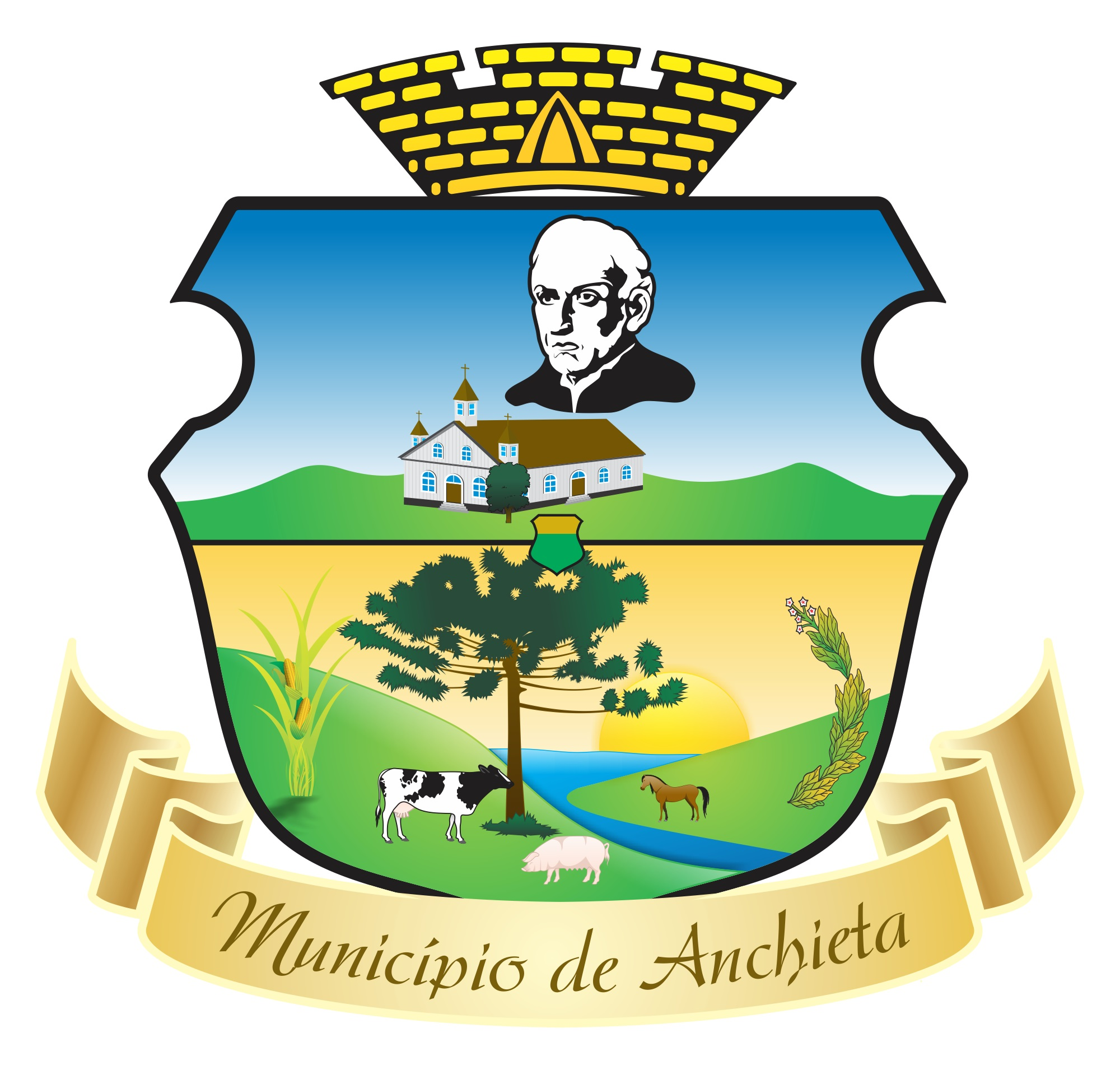
- Flag Coat of arms
- Interactive map of Anchieta, Santa Catarina
- Country: Brazil
- Region: South
- State: Santa Catarina
- Mesoregion: Oeste Catarinense

Population (2020)
  - Total: 5,557
- Time zone: UTC−3 (BRT)

Anchieta, Santa Catarina is a municipality in the state of Santa Catarina in the South region of Brazil.

== See also ==
- List of municipalities in Santa Catarina
