= Sketches of the Life of the Great Priest =

Print series by Utagawa Kuniyoshi

Sketches of the Life of the Great Priest series
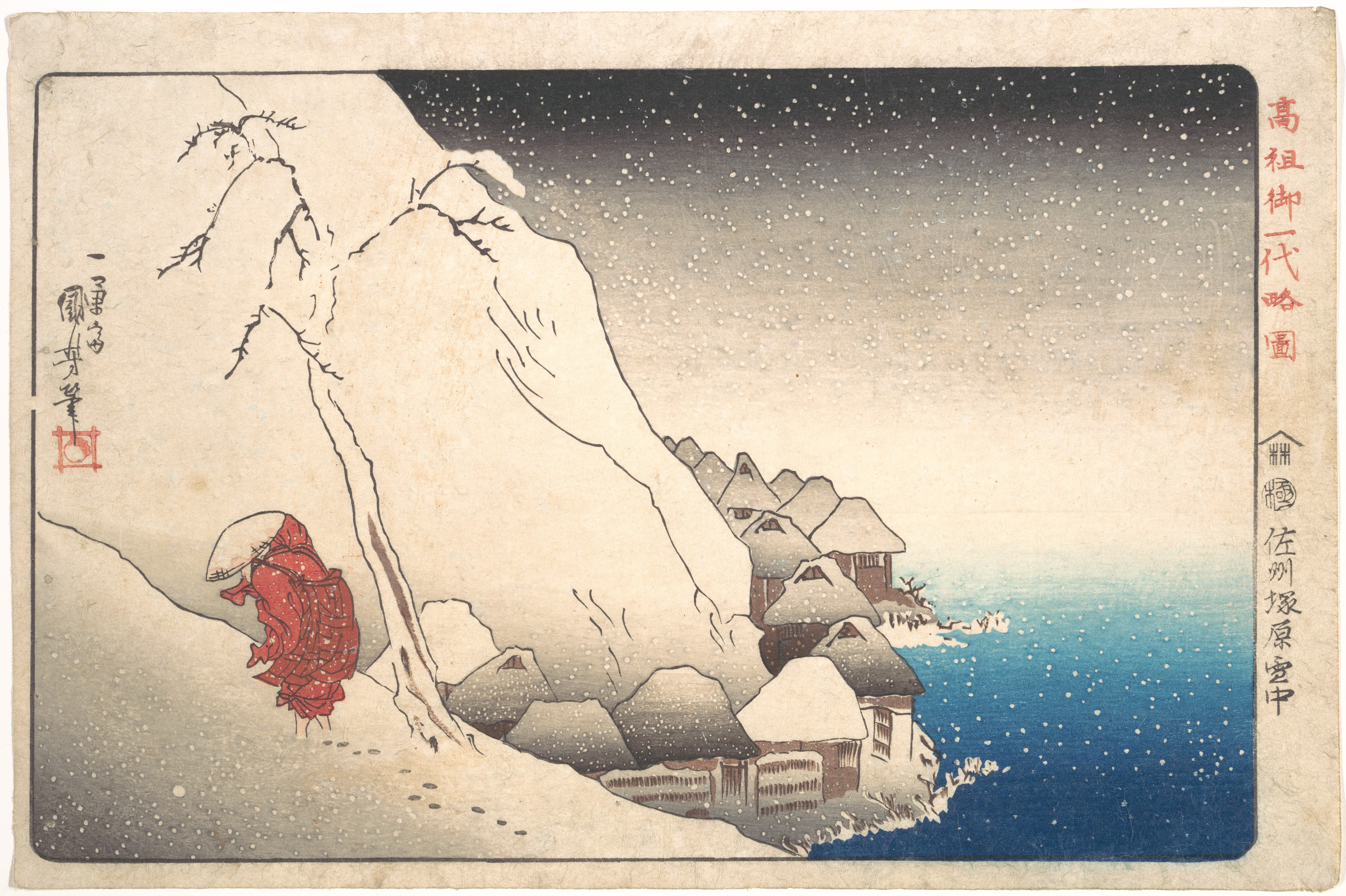
- In the Snow at Tsukahara, Sado Island
- Housed at: National Diet Library; British Museum; Museum of Modern Art; Baur Foundation; Allen Memorial Art Museum; Michele and Donald D'Amour Museum of Fine Arts
- Size (no. of items): 10

Sketches of the Life of the Great Priest (Japanese: 高祖御一代略図, Hepburn: Kōso goichidai ryakuzu) (c. 1831) is a series of ten Japanese woodblock prints in ink and color on paper made by ukiyo-e artist Utagawa Kuniyoshi (1798–1861). It was released by publisher Iseya Rihei in 1835–1836. The prints, which are in the large, horizontal, multi-colored woodblock format, tell the story of Nichiren (1222–1282), a Japanese Buddhist priest, philosopher and founder of Nichiren Buddhism. Kuniyoshi's series reveals the influence of artist Kawamura Bunpō from the Kishi school of painting.

In the Snow at Tsukahara, Sado Island, is generally considered the greatest work in the entire series. There are four known variations of this print—two with a horizon line and two without. The original ten prints are believed to have been used to illustrate Buddhist teaching materials and are part of an ancient illustrated literary tradition ascribed to Buddhist printmaking. Sketches of the Life of the Great Priest is one of five separate series of prints by Kuniyoshi focused on the theme of religion. It represents Kuniyoshi's eleventh major work since 1820 and roughly his 180th to 190th individual work. In total, he produced around 1,000 works, including variants, duplicates, and multiple individual pieces within a single series.

== Background ==
Utagawa Kuniyoshi (1798–1861) is best known for musha-e, a genre of ukiyo-e woodblock printing that depicts warriors from history and mythology. His late 1820s musha-e, 108 Heroes of the Suikoden, is cited as the breakthrough work that established his name and contributed to his first major success. Before becoming a master of musha-e, Kuniyoshi made an attempt at yakusha-e (depictions of kabuki actors), but was unable to achieve any fame or notability in that genre. Secondarily, Kuniyoshi was known for bijin-ga (pictures of beautiful women) and for landscapes. The landscape genre in ukiyo-e became popular in the 1830s and 1840s, particularly as expressed in the style and work of Kuniyoshi's colleague Hiroshige (1797–1858), both of whom were students of the Utagawa school. Kuniyoshi's gō, or art name, "kuni", derives from a syllable of his master's gō, Utagawa Toyokuni (1769–1825). Kuniyoshi's landscapes in the 1830s and 1840s were partly influenced by his knowledge of European art and his collection of Western-style prints.

Kuniyoshi received a commission in 1831 for a new print series in remembrance of the 550-year anniversary of the death of Nichiren (1222–1282), the founder of Nichiren Buddhism. The finished prints show creases down the middle, indicating they were originally folded into Nichiren Buddhist religious materials. East Asian art historian Mary W. Baskett notes the long, ancient tradition of Buddhist printmaking, tracing woodblock printing traditions in Japan back to Buddhist devotional rituals. The custom of depicting the life of Nichiren in Japanese art was also already well established before Kuniyoshi began his new project. One popular example, The Life of the Priest Nichiren, was a woodblock print produced during the Tenna period (1611–1684), illustrating 17 events in Nichiren's life. It was likely used by religious adherents as a kind of reference work. Nichiren shonin chugwasan, a similar work depicting 89 images of Nichiren's life, was published in 1632. The theme continued during the subsequent Edo period, with another version illustrating 28 images from the life of Nichiren. During the Edo period, the need for printed religious materials increased in use for the purpose of teaching, with Kuniyoshi's work a notable example during this era, along with the older Illustrated Life of Kobo Daishi (early 17th century), depicting the life of Kūkai (774–835), founder of Shingon Buddhism, and the later Illustrated Life of Sakyamumi Buddha (1845) by Hokusai (1760–1849). After Kuniyoshi died, his ashes were interred at the Daisenji temple, a 16th-century Nichiren Buddhist temple in Kodaira, Tokyo.

== Development ==
Instead of drawing upon the older styles of well known works depicting Nichiren, Kuniyoshi's Sketches of the Life of the Great Priest shows the influence of the Kishi school, particularly the work of Kawamura Bunpō (河村文鳳) (1779–1821) as found in his gafu (picture album), a landscape painting manual known as Bunpō sansui gafu (文鳳山水画) (A Book of Drawings of Landscapes by Bunpō). Kuniyoshi's new approach emphasized a connection between the larger figures in the foreground against the landscape in the background. Sketches of the Life of the Great Priest was an example of this new perspective, using the historical figure of Nichiren to demonstrate Kuniyoshi's new technique. Art historian Woldemar von Seidlitz (1850–1922) described Kuniyoshi's approach to landscape as having a "strength and grandeur of style that gives him a place perhaps even higher than Hiroshige".

== Series ==
Kuniyoshi's Sketches of the Life of the Great Priest is one of five separate series of prints focused on the theme of religion. In addition to the life of Nichiren depicted in the Sketches, Kuniyoshi's other religious series covers the Tenno Festival, Otake Dainichi Nyorai, the Seven Lucky Gods, and a miscellaneous assortment depicting Japanese folklore and legendary Buddhist figures. Sketches represents his eleventh major work since 1820 and approximately his 180th to 190th individual work in total. His entire oeuvre comprises around 1,000 works, (Note: Robinson (1961) had previously estimated about 5,000 works by Kuniyoshi; Lane (1963) proposed the number could be as high as 15–30,000 total number of works in different mediums. However, in 1978, Lane published a rough catalog numbering only around 1000 known works in ukiyo-e.) including many variants, duplicates, and individual pieces within a single series. The prints (Note: See Tanaka 1926 for an example of the sequential order in a physical print edition. Some influential collections and catalogs (for example, Robinson 1982) fail to present the prints in the historical order presented by the artist.) are listed in chronological order of the life of Nichiren. Kuniyoshi presents romanticized illustrations and legendary accounts of events in Nichiren's life. The title of the series appears on the right margin in red with the mark of the publisher Iseya Rihei (Ise-Ri Kinjudo), (Note: For more information about the publisher Iseya Rihei, see Marks 2010, pp. 234-237.) while the subtitle appears in black below it. The prints are signed 朝櫻楼 / 国芳画 (Chooro / Kuniyoshi ga). An approval stamp (kiwame) by the censor is also shown. There are ten prints in the entire series, each of which is in the large, ōban (大判) format of 10 by 14 inches (25 by 36 centimeters), in a horizontal or landscape yoko-e (横絵) orientation, printed with multi-colored or nishiki-e (錦絵) woodblocks. The series is referred to by many names, the result of various English translations, with Illustrated Abridged Biography of the Founder one of the more popular titles. (Note: For example: Brief Illustrated History of Life of the Great Monk; Concise Illustrated Biography of Monk Nichiren, Pictorial Biography of the Founder of the Nichiren Sect, etc.)

=== 1. Tōjō Komatsubara, Eleventh day of Eleventh month, 1264 ===
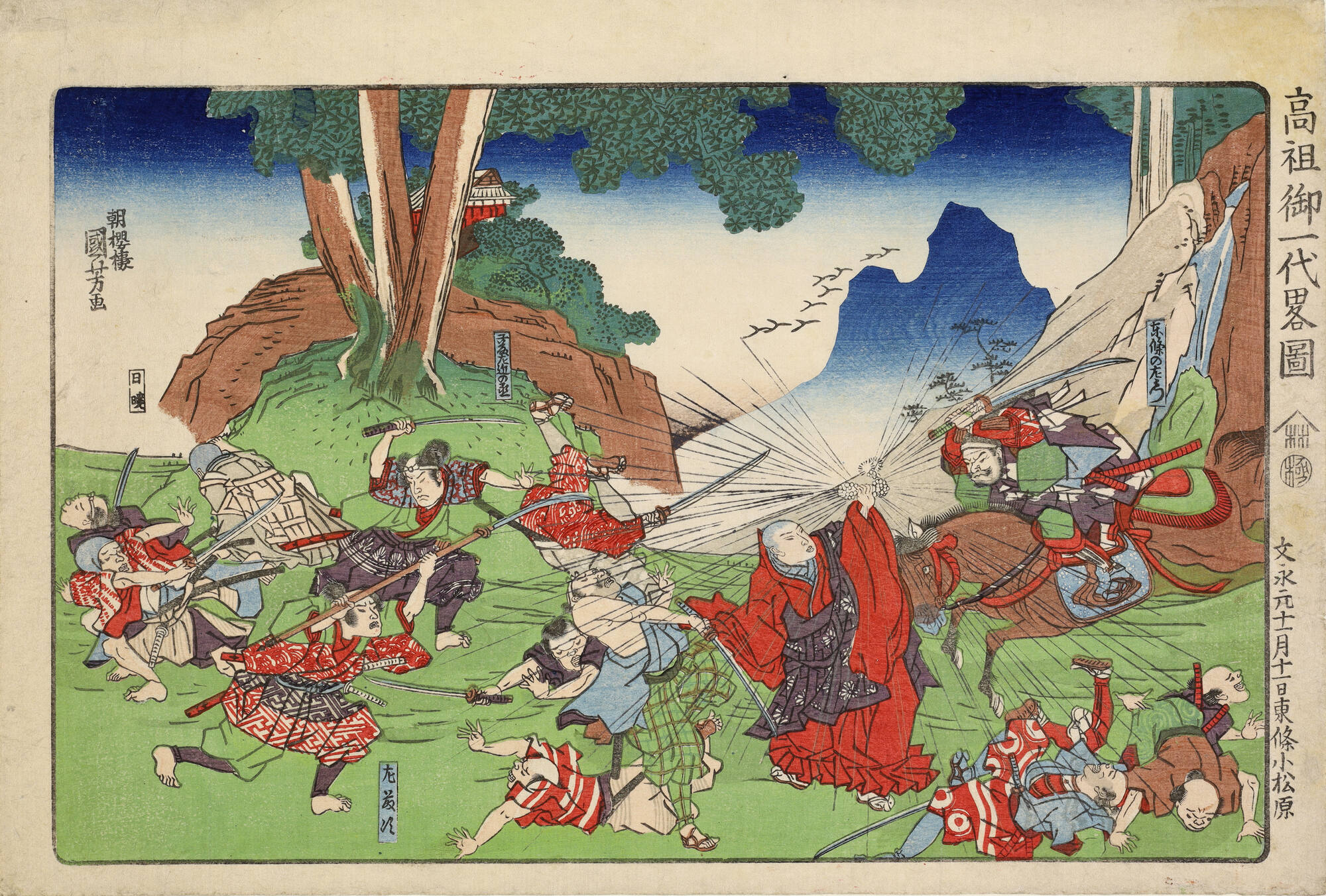

Tōjō Komatsubara, Eleventh day of Eleventh month, 1264 (文永元十一月十一日東條小松原) depicts Tōjō Kagenobu and his warriors, including horsemen and swordsmen, who ambush Nichiren at Komatsubara in the Awa Province in November 1264. Nichiren is shown holding up his mala (rosary), whose sparkling crystals confuse his attackers. Nikkyo, his student, is seen in the background, crouching.

In 1253, Nichiren famously criticized Pure Land Buddhism (Amidism) by proclaiming the superiority of the Lotus Sutra. Nichiren was trained in the Tendai school, which believed in the central importance of the Lotus Sutra teaching. Ten years later, Tōjō Kagenobu and his warriors, supporters of Pure Land, tried to assassinate Nichiren at Matsubara in Tōjō. According to legend, two of Nichiren's supporters died in the attack and Nichiren himself was cut by a sword on his head and suffered a broken hand. Nichiren Buddhists refer to the event depicted by Kuniyoshi as the "Komatsubara Persecution".

=== 2. Praying for Rain at Reizen-ga-saki ===
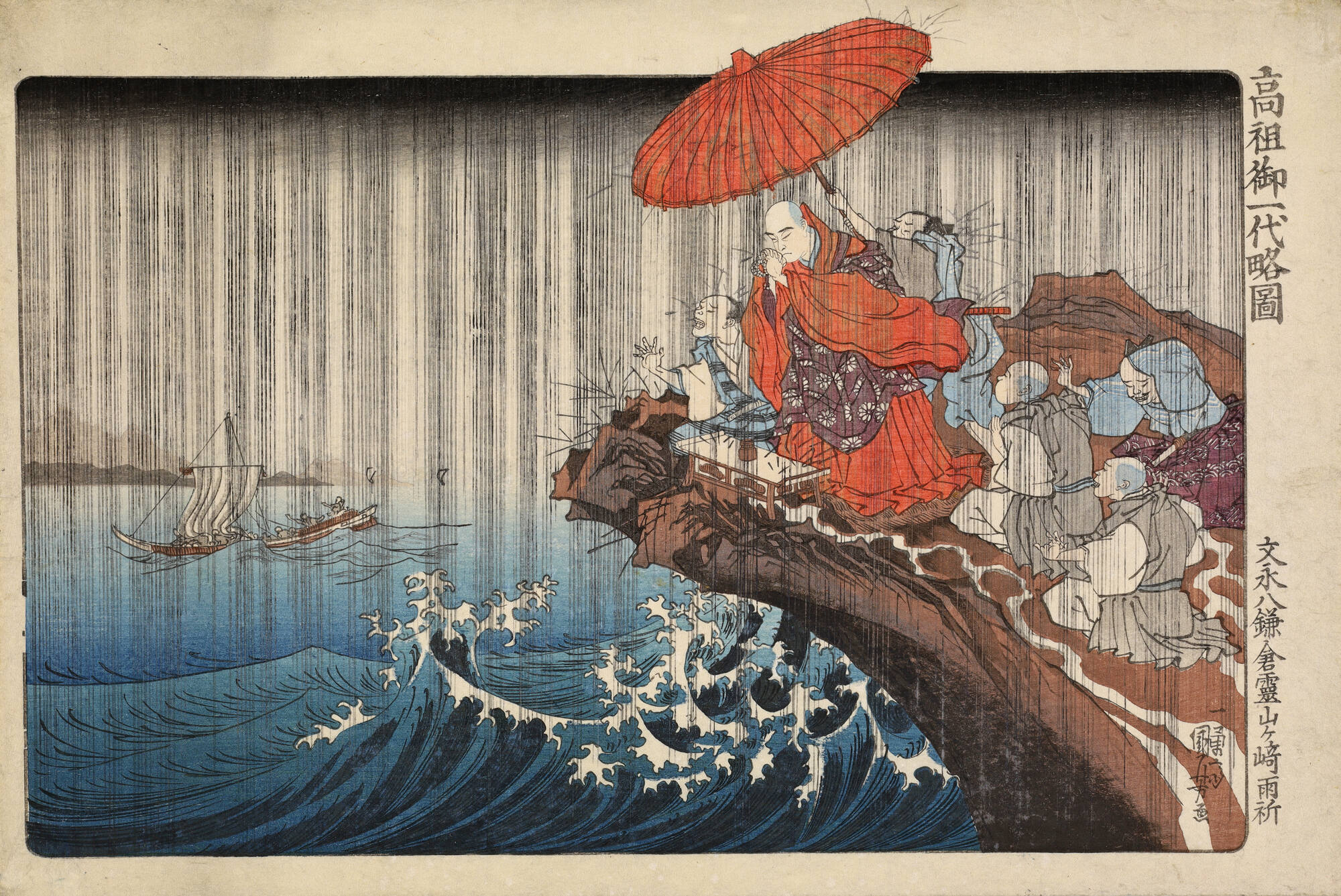

Praying for Rain at Reizen-ga-saki (文永八鎌倉霊山ヶ崎雨祈) shows a stormy sea with Nichiren up above praying at an altar with his mala (rosary) under an umbrella; his prayers appear to be answered by a downpour.

Japan experienced a major drought in the summer of 1271. The government asked Ninshō (1217–1303), the first chief priest of Gokurakuji, to conduct rain rituals. Nichiren, then a lowly monk, criticized Ninshō's supporters, wagering that even he would follow Ninshō if he made it rain in a week. It did not rain, and Nichiren took advantage of the challenge to take on new followers for himself. Baskett notes that the romanticized legendary history depicted in the image might have been added after Nichiren died, although previous artists had also illustrated the "miracle" in the 17th century.

=== 3. Threatened at Tatsunokuchi in Sagami Province ===
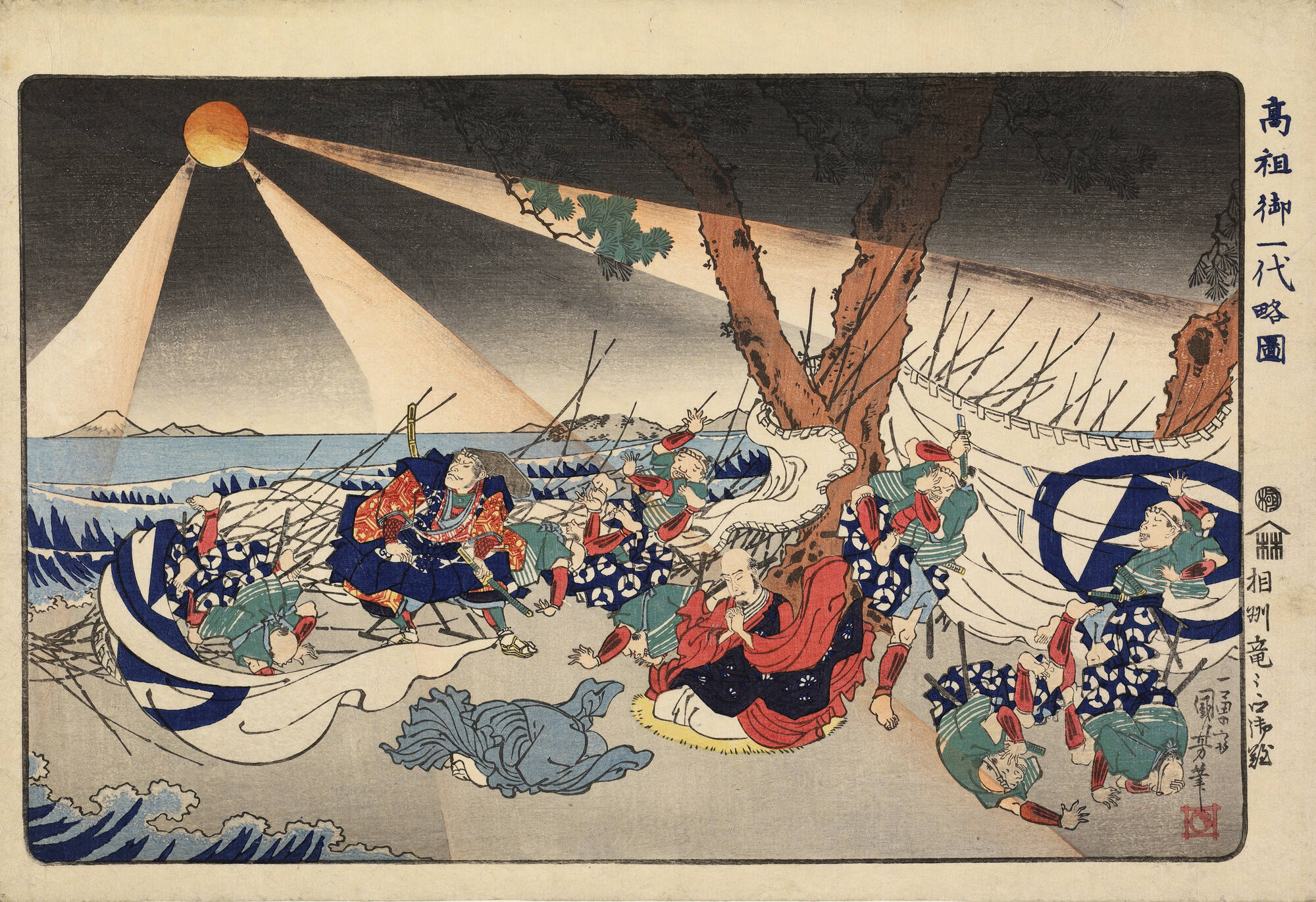

Threatened at Tatsunokuchi in Sagami Province (相州竜之口御難) depicts Nichiren in prayer, kneeling beside a pine tree by the ocean. He is about to be executed at Tatsunokuchi when the rays from the sun destroy the executioner's sword, averting his death.

Nichiren's incessant attacks on the other Buddhist schools led to Hōjō Tokimune, the de facto ruler of Japan, exiling him to the Izu Peninsula in 1261, which only lasted a few years. Continuing his attacks, Nichiren's enemies obtained the help of the Kamakura shogunate who plotted to behead him. He was brought to Takinoguchi beach at Shichirigahama for the execution, legends recount, but as the sword was about to come down on his neck, it broke in half, with various other supernatural accounts alleged to have occurred to prevent and forestall his death.

=== 4. The Star of Wisdom Descends on the Thirteenth Night of the Ninth Month ===
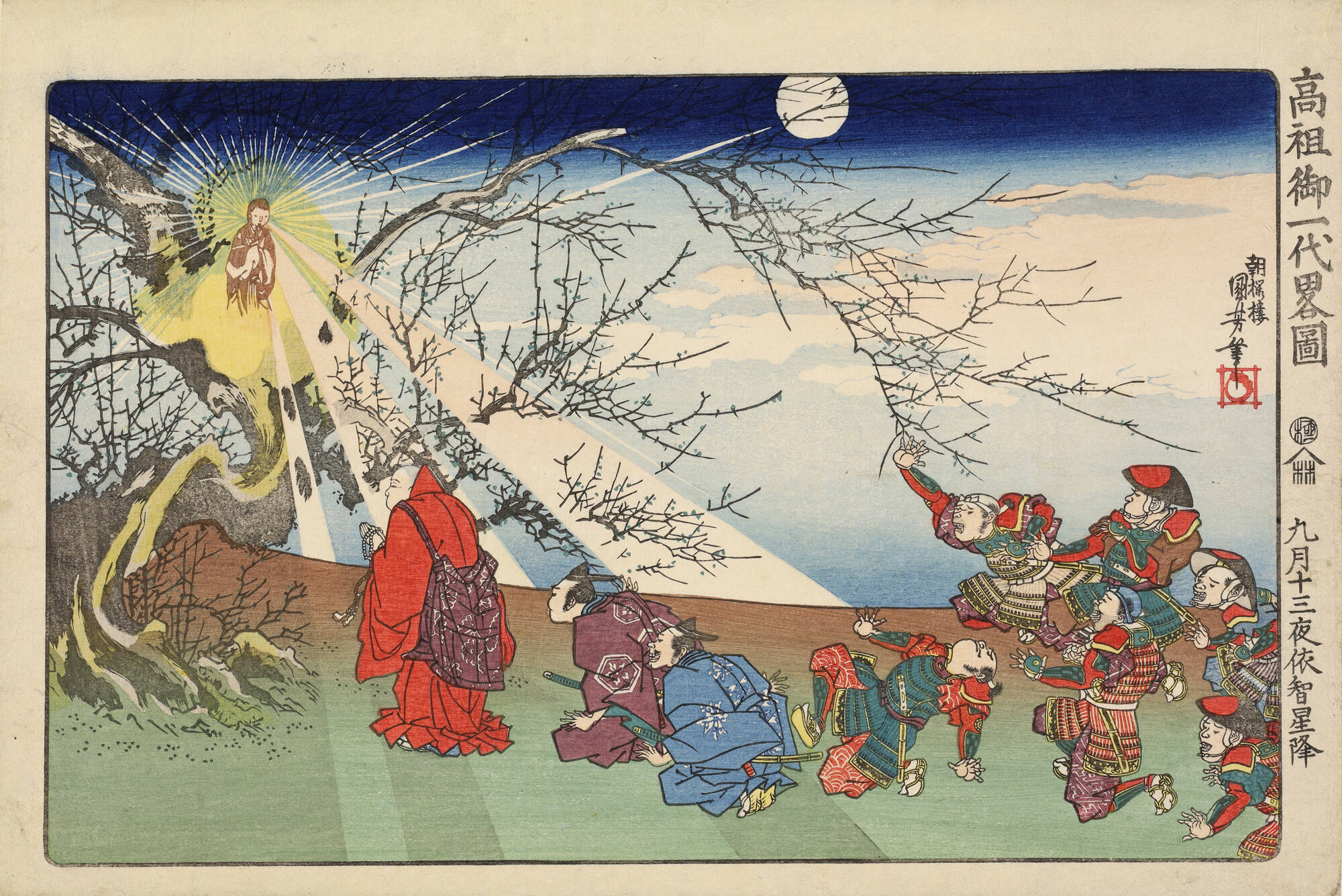

The Star of Wisdom Descends on the Thirteenth Night of the Ninth Month (九月十三夜依智星) shows Nichiren standing before a plum tree with his rosary, facing the ghostly appearance of the Buddha above the tree.

Writing for Artibus Asiae in the 1930s, Raymond A. Bidwell, who would later go on to donate the largest collection of Kuniyoshi prints in the U.S. to the Springfield Museum of Fine Arts, compared this print to early Christian art in Italy. Bidwell wonders if Kuniyoshi was addressing similar subjects and treatments, perhaps "the same spirituality and relationship of man to God as was expressed by the Italian primitives in their pictures of God appearing to the saints". Bidwell lays out his argument for some kind of historical parallel between Japanese and Christian art across the centuries: "...Nichiren and the rough soldiers who have him in custody see in adoration and consternation a vision of The Buddha standing in the branches of a leafless plum tree on a clear moonlight night. The intense beauty of the evening sky and moon against the lace like branches of the aged and gnarled plum tree, make you feel that God must manifest himself directly". Bidwell concludes that Kuniyoshi transcended the Italian painters in his successful approach.

=== 5. Banishment to Sado Island: Sutra Title on the Waves at Kakuta ===
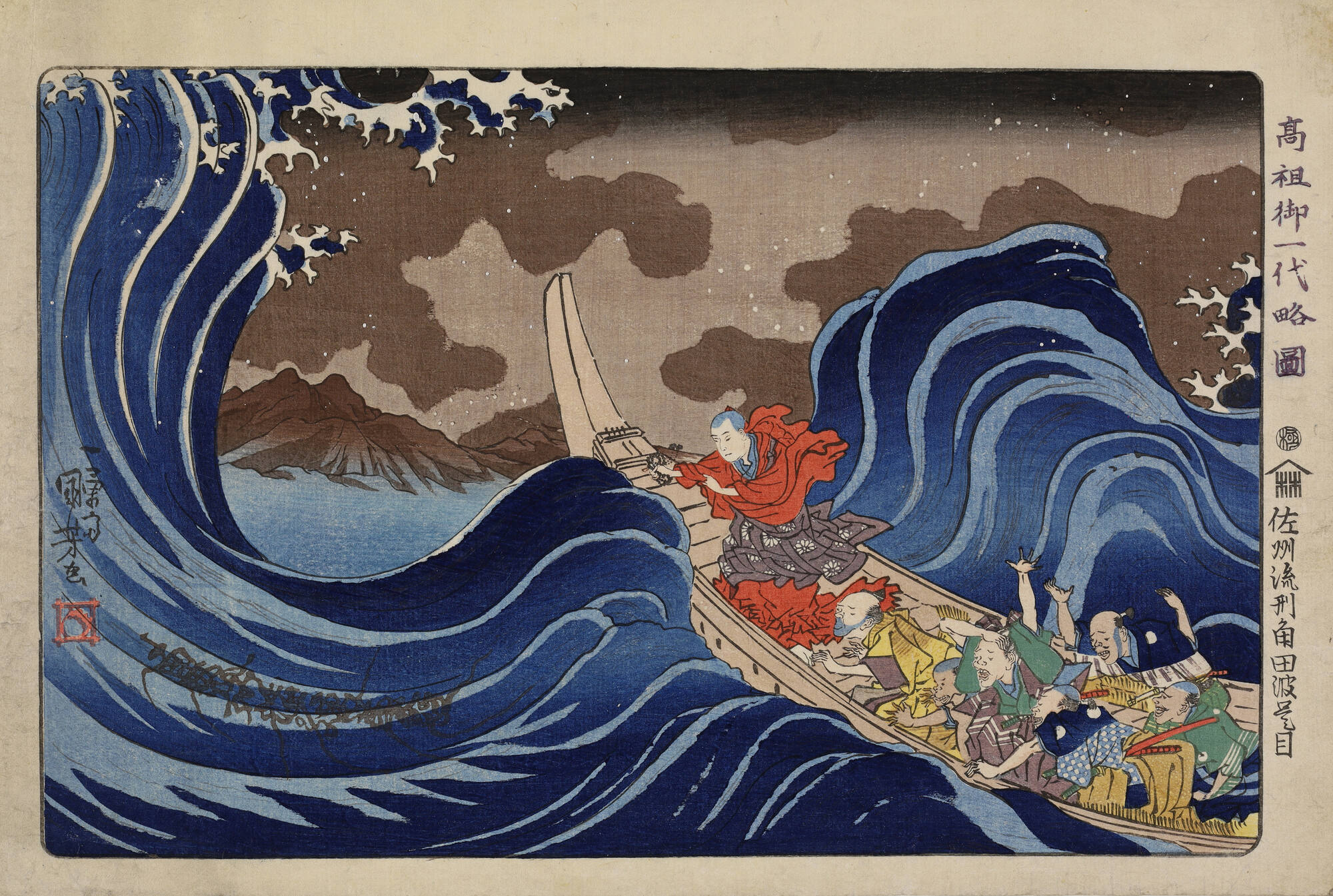

Banishment to Sado Island: Sutra Title on the Waves at Kakuta (佐州流刑角田波題目) depicts Nichiren on his way to his forced exile to Sado Island while a large storm in the Sea of Japan threatens to destroy Nichiren's boat and frightened crew. To protect them, Nichiren casts a spell, the first line of the Lotus Sutra, "Namu Myōhō Renge Kyō", which appears on the waves.

In 1271, after insulting Hōjō Tokimune, Nichiren was, for the second time, arrested and exiled, this time to Sado Island. According to Japanese myth and legends surrounding Nichiren, the storm was caused by Susanoo-no-Mikoto, a kami associated with the sea and storms. Nichiren was able to calm the sea by using the first line of the Lotus Sutra for protection. Like other images of Nichiren, this was also depicted in previous Buddhist artwork in the 17th century. Art historian Christine M. E. Guth notes the influence of Hokusai (1760–1849) on this work, particularly what she calls a "creative reinterpretation" of the style of Hokusai's The Great Wave off Kanagawa (1831), a style which Kuniyoshi returned to again in his later work, Tametomo's Ten Heroic Deeds (1847–50).

=== 6. In the Snow at Tsukahara, Sado Island ===
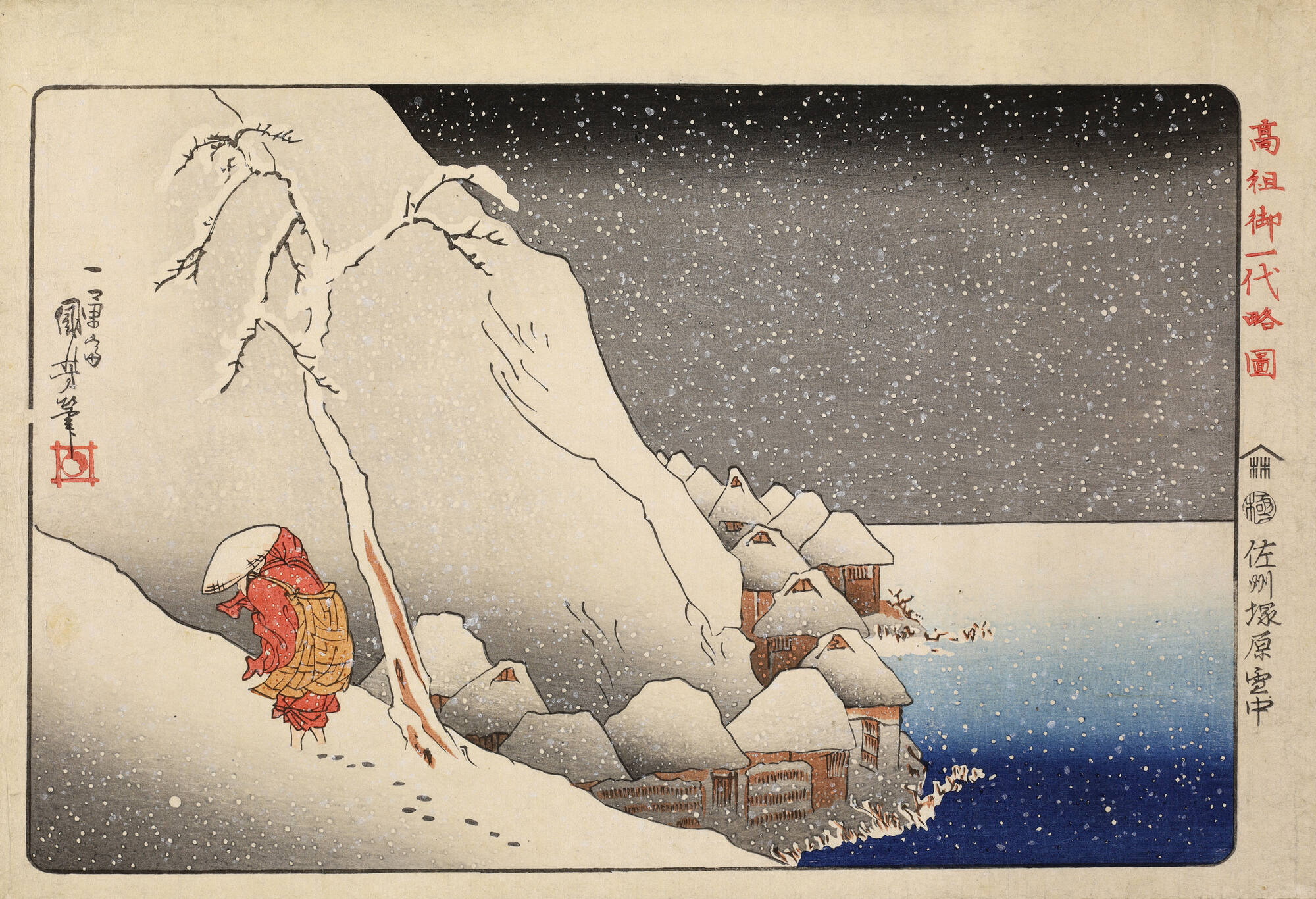

In the Snow at Tsukahara, Sado Island (佐州塚原雪中) shows Nichiren walking in the snow on Sado Island. He is depicted climbing, by himself, up a hill covered in snow; the houses in the village are visible below. He wears red robes as snowflakes fall around him. The date is also 1271.

Baskett notes that upon his exile, Nichiren was left in a cemetery with crude shelter from the elements in the midst of a harsh winter characterized as "one of extreme cold, snow, and hoarfrost". Kuniyoshi's landscape was influenced by artist Kawamura Bunpō, based on a design from his book, Bunpō sansui gafu (A Book of Drawings of Landscapes by Bunpō). Kuniyoshi's colleague Kunisada (1786–1865) also referred to Bunpō's work in his designs. There is general agreement that this print is considered the greatest example of the entire series, with Baskett describing it as "the most loved and accomplished of the prints". The Metropolitan Museum of Art refers to it as a "masterpiece of ukiyo-e printmaking".

Art historian Matthi Forrer (Note: Forrer was curator at Wereldmuseum Leiden and later professor of Culture of Pre-Modern Japan at Leiden University.) recognizes at least four print variants of this image in the series in order of primacy: no horizon line and light mountains; no horizon line and dark mountains; with horizon and dark bokashi (gradation of ink giving the appearance of lightness and darkness of a single color); and with horizon, no title, no publisher's mark, and no kiwame seal. Forrer also notes that some prints use the white gofun pigment. Over the years, the debate over the primacy of the original work in this series has been contentious, with no clear contender for the original print. Art historians B. W. Robinson and Jūzō Suzuki (1919-2010) believed that the print with the horizon line was the original one, which Robinson thought was later removed in subsequent printings. Hamilton Easter Field argued against this characterization as does Forrer, who admits the issue is unsettled, but believes the two print variations with the horizon line are attributed to later prints, not earlier ones, and that the available evidence demonstrates that the earliest print had no horizon.

Kuniyoshi's student Tsukioka Yoshitoshi (1839–1892) later produced a work based on a similar theme but with more of a humorous take titled Nichiren sitting in a snow-covered hut, during his exile on Sado (1882).

Claude Monet (1840–1926) experimented with painting snowy landscapes, having painted the largest number out of any other Impressionist. Monet was also fascinated by ukeyo-e design and themes. He was an avid collector of Japanese woodcut prints, and when he died, Monet left behind 231 Japanese prints decorating his house at Giverny, one of which was In the Snow at Tsukahara, Sado Island.

=== 7. Gazing at the Rock on Komuro mountain, on the Twenty-eighth of the Fourth month, 1274 ===
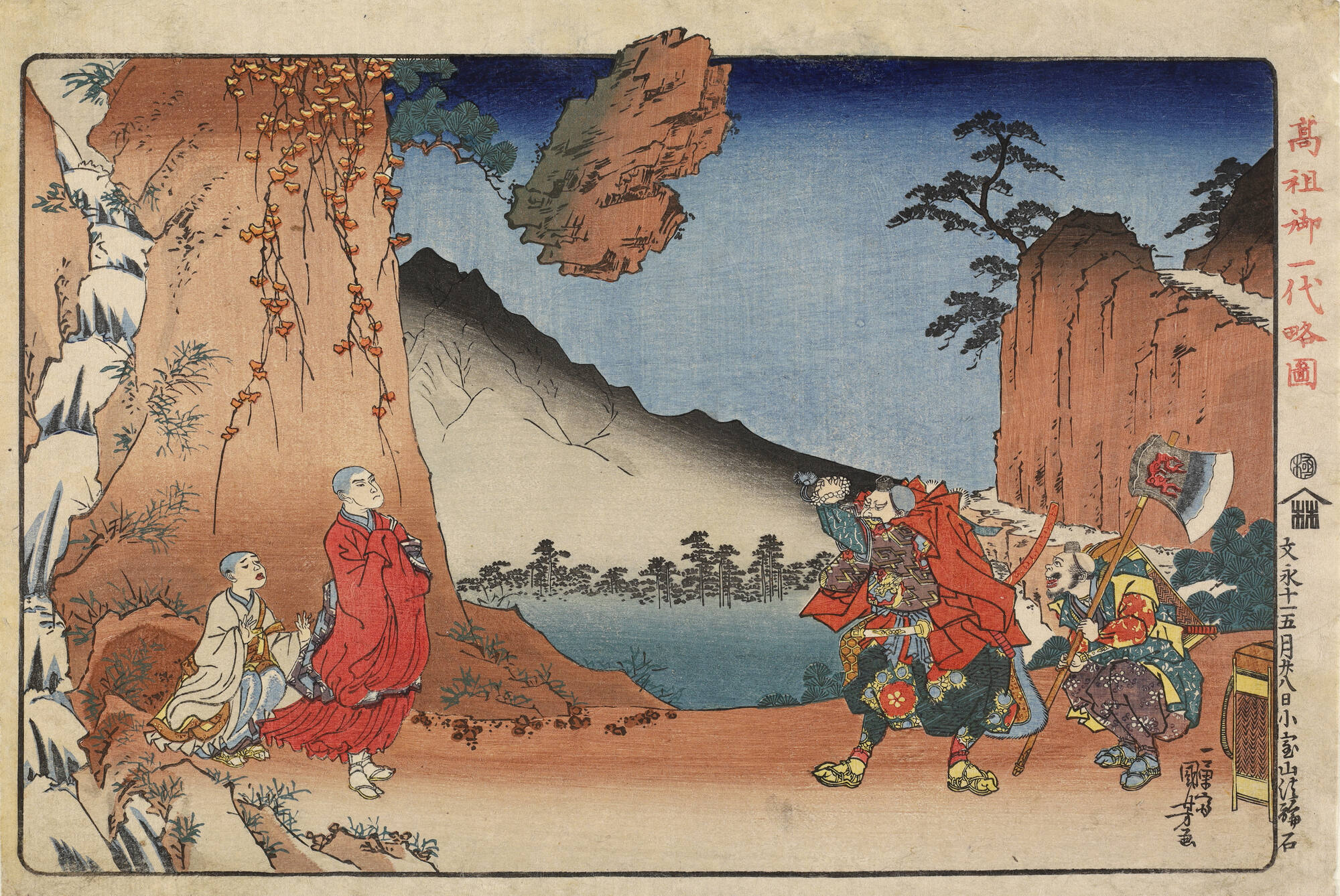

Gazing at the Rock on Komuro mountain, on the Twenty-eighth of the Fourth month, 1274 (文永十一五月廾八日小室山注視石) depicts Nichiren in Komuroyama suspending a large rock thrown at him by a Yamabushi.

Various versions of this legend exist. In one retelling, the Yamabushi threw a rock at Nichiren, which he was able to suspend in the air by the sheer will of his "spiritual power". In another version of the story, a member of a competing Buddhist school (Robinson describes the figure as a "warrior-monk") invited Nichiren to a contest to see who had the greater religious power to control the levitation of a rock. According to this legend, the man was able to lift the rock but Nichiren prevented him from lowering it. Upon losing the contest, the story goes, the man left his sect and became Nichiren's follower.

=== 8. Nichiren Praying for the Repose of the Soul of the Cormorant Fisher at the Isawa River in Kai Province ===
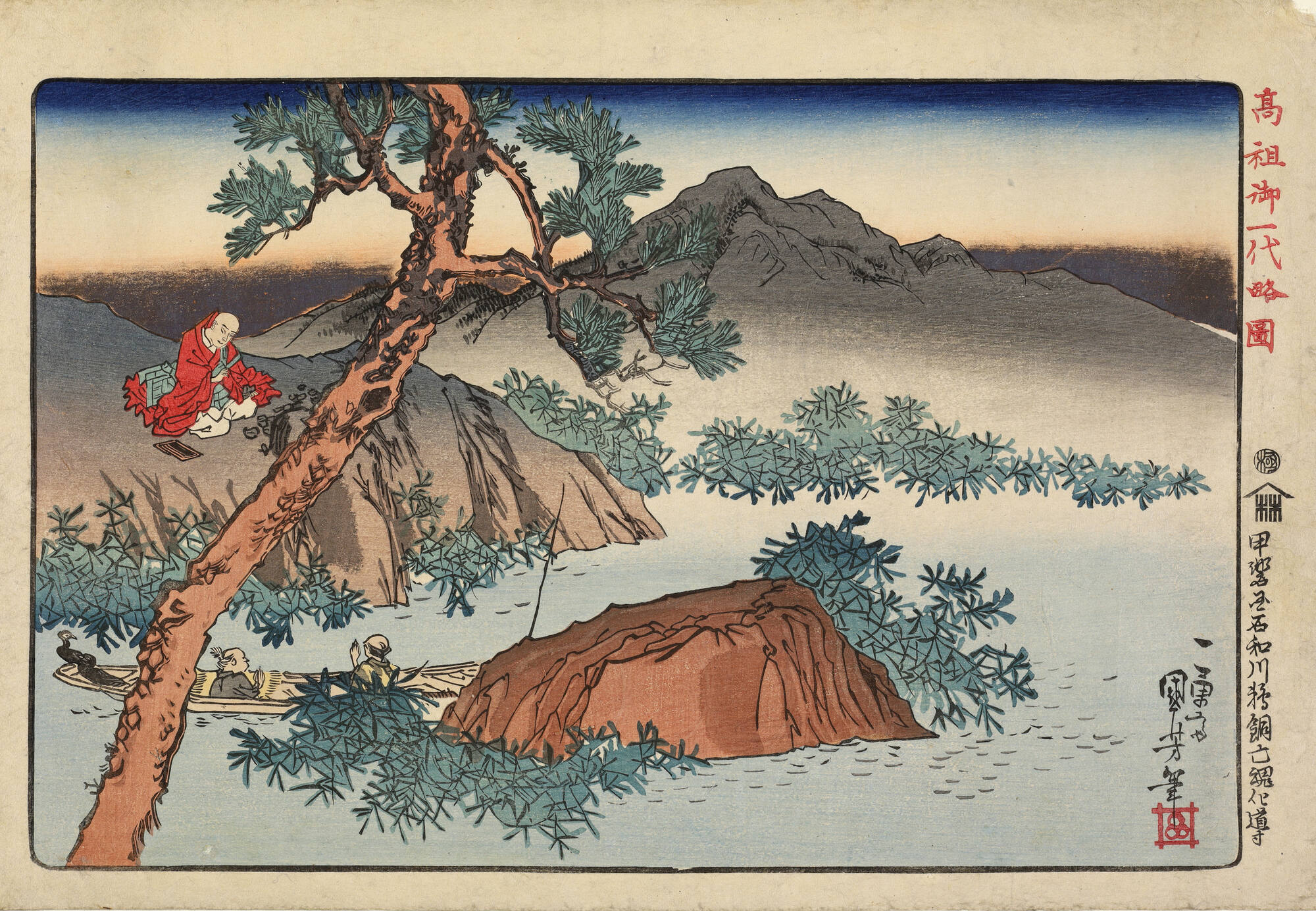

Nichiren Praying for the Repose of the Soul of the Cormorant Fisher at the Isawa River in Kai Province (甲斐 石和川鵜飼亡魂 道) shows Nichiren seated above a riverbank bluff. Two fishermen who use trained cormorants to catch fish are seen below in their boats with their hands in the act of prayer. Nichiren is variously described by art historians as "converting the spirit" of a fisherman, or exorcising the ghost of a fisherman. The title used by the Allen Memorial Art Museum indicates that the fisherman is deceased, and Nichiren is offering prayers that will help his soul rest in peace. In 13th-century Japan, some Buddhist sects discriminated against fishermen as they were viewed as untouchables because they killed and handled dead fish for their livelihood. Nichiren, the son of a fisherman, was thought to be favorable to them and their social class. Baskett believes that the image shows a rarely seen gentle and sympathetic side to Nichiren.

The story depicted by Kuniyoshi has a long history. In Japanese folklore, the dead fisherman is known as Ukai Kansaku (鵜飼勘作), a legend that is thought to have arose during or just after the Heian period, sometime after 1189. According to that story, fishing was prohibited in the Fuefuki River at that time, but Kansaku, a cormorant fisherman, fished in spite of the law. He was captured and executed for the crime, and it was said that his yūrei (幽霊) or ghost haunted the town for many years until Nichiren appeared in 1274. Kuniyoshi's image depicts Nichiren writing on small pebbles above the river. In the legend of Ukai Kansaku, Nichiren (or his disciple) wrote the Lotus Sutra on stones which were then thrown into the river, a ritual which was believed to generate merit to help Kansaku rest in peace. Onmyoji Temple, which was built on the site of the incident, displays sutra stone relics in the city of Fuefuki. The temple also recorded the story in extant religious texts. Methodist priest and ethnographer Emu Yamanaka (1850-1928) studied Nichiren Buddhist sutra stones in 1901 and makes note of the legend.

External image
- Sutra stone relics on display at Onmyoji Temple, date unknown

The legend of Nichiren and the cormorant fisherman became widely known in Japan and influenced popular folklore traditions. Playwright Zeami Motokiyo (1363–1443) revised the famous Noh repertory work Ukai (1400) by Enami Saemon Gorō, a play about the legend of Ukai. In the play, two monks meet a cormorant fisherman at the Isawa River after being denied accommodation in the local town. The fisherman provides the monks with a place to stay but expresses regret about his vocation which involves killing. One of the monks remembers that a fisherman once housed them in the past. The fisherman tells them that the man is dead, having been killed for illegally poaching. The man then reveals that he is in fact the ghost of the dead fisherman. Japanese literature scholar Paul S. Atkins notes that the priests "pray for the repose of the murdered fisherman, and a fierce demon from hell enters to announce that the fisherman had been destined for torment in hell for his sins, but was freed by the good deed of giving lodging to a monk." One of the priests is popularly interpreted as Nichiren. According to another interpretation by Japanese theater scholar Katherine Saltzman-Li, Nichiren "helps the ghost of a cormorant fisherman...attain his enlightenment through the benefits of the Lotus Sutra." Yoshitoshi returned to this theme with several different works, including the triptych Picture of the priest Nichiren praying for the restless spirit of the cormorant fisherman of the Isawa river (1885).

=== 9. Manifestation of the Seven-faced divinity at Minobuzan, 9th month 1277 ===
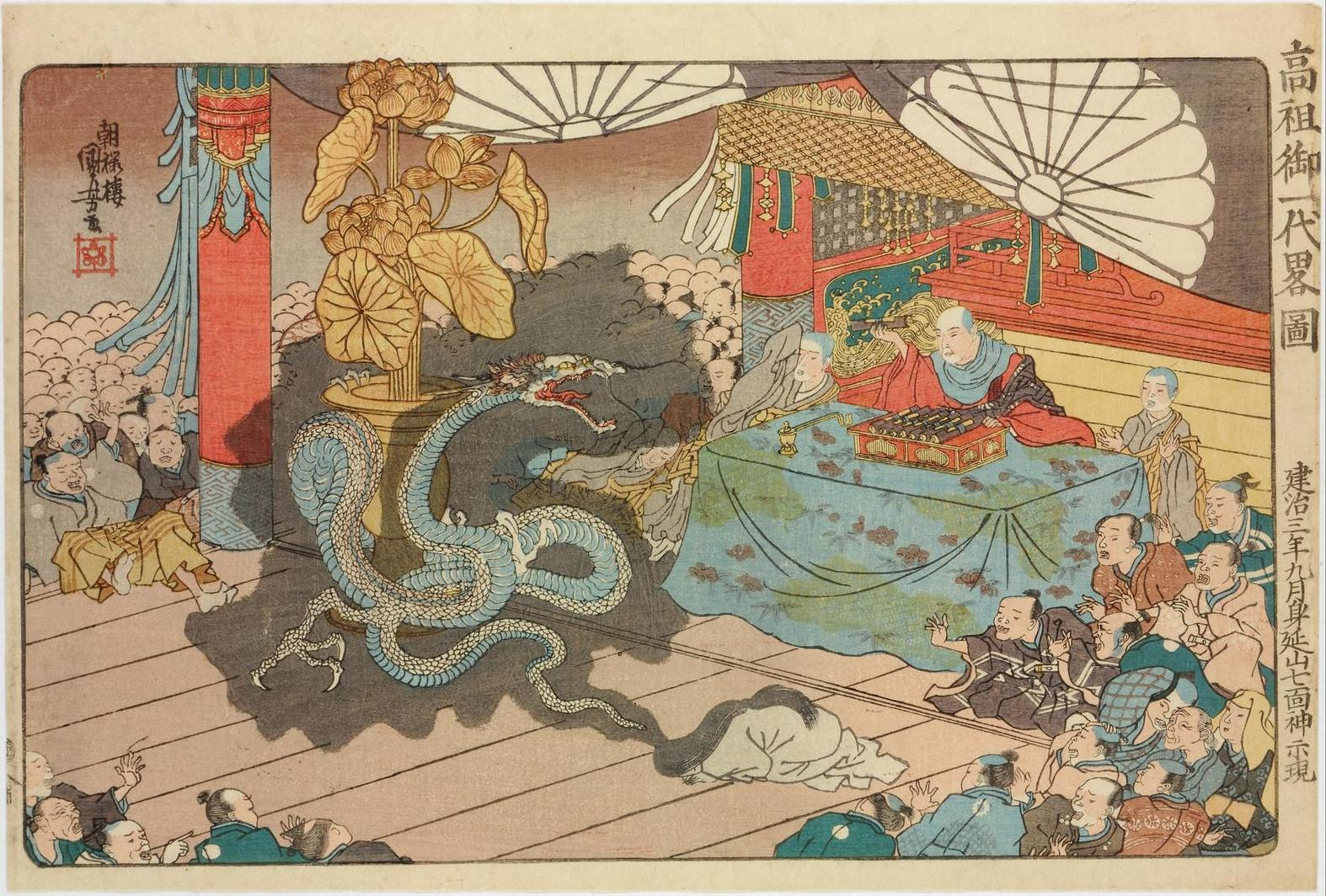

Manifestation of the Seven-faced divinity at Minobuzan, 9th month 1277 (建治三年九月身延山七面神示現) depicts Nichiren exorcising a woman in a temple, bringing forth a dragon which frightens the people in assembly.

According to legend, in 1277 Nichiren was at Mount Minobu praying when a beautiful woman appeared and interrupted him. Holding up his Buddhist scriptures, Nichiren compelled her to show her true self, at which point she transformed into a shichimen daimyōjin (seven-faced dragon) and vanished. Before Kuniyoshi created this image from accounts of Nichiren's life, it was previously known from at least two older woodblock representations. These include The Life of the Priest Nichiren from the late Tenna period (1681–1684), and an even larger, later version from the Edo period in the Takamizawa collection Later, Kuniyoshi's student, Utagawa Yoshitora, produced a similar work in the form of a triptych known as The Origin of Shichimen Daimyojin (1870).

=== 10. Nichiren's Destruction of the Mongol Fleet, 1281 ===
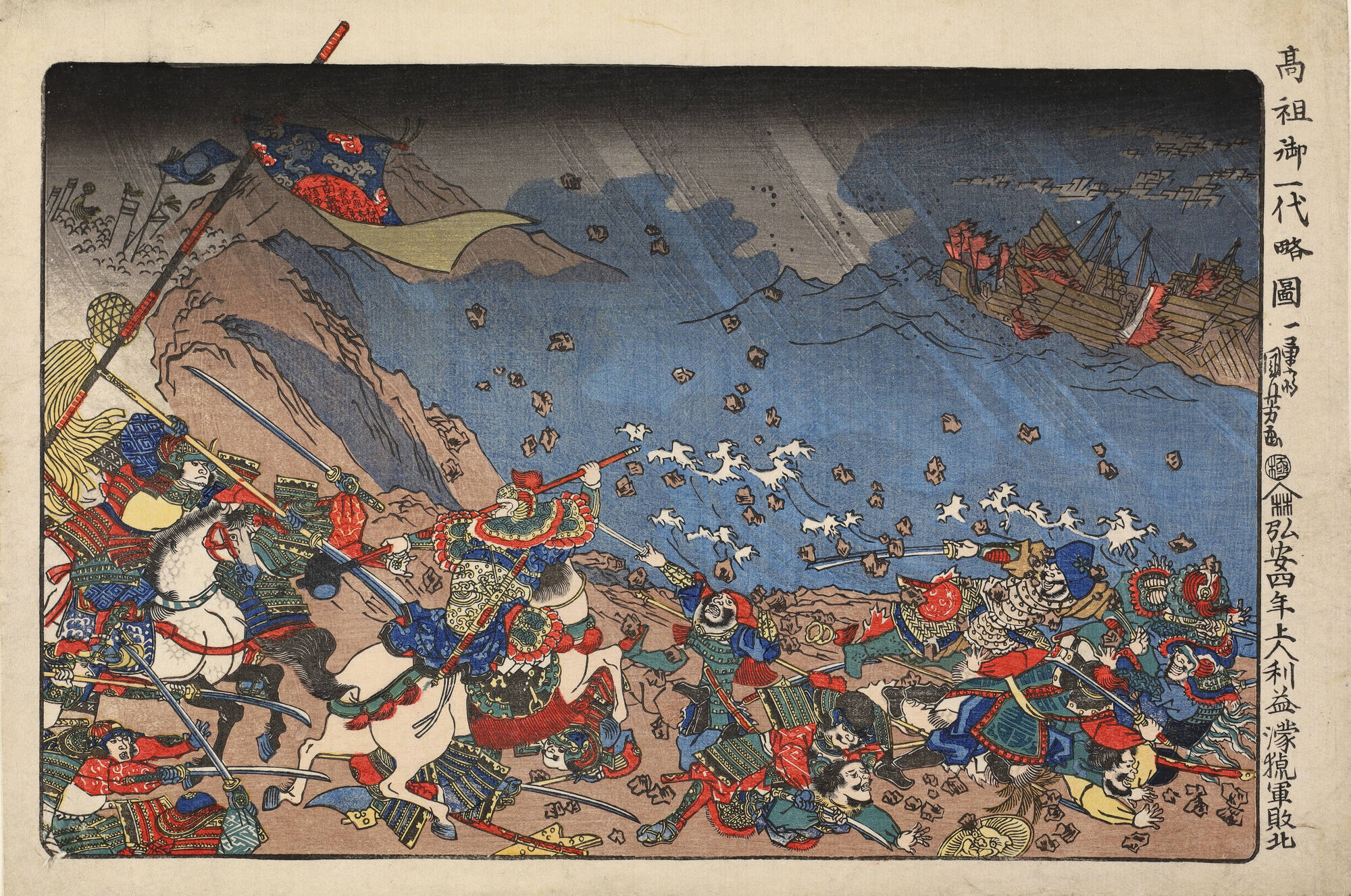

Nichiren's Destruction of the Mongol Fleet, 1281 (弘安四年上八利益濛 軍敗北) shows Japanese soldiers driving back a Mongol invasion. Mongol ships fire stones from catapults towards the shore, but the ships appear to be sinking due to the storm and power of Nichiren's prayers.

In the summer of 1281, the Mongol-led Yuan dynasty of China invaded Japan for the second time in the Battle of Kōan, seven years after the previous Battle of Bun'ei in 1274. In the battle, a storm aided the Japanese defense, as it helped to sink part of the Mongol fleet. As part of the legend, it is often claimed that Nichiren predicted the Mongol invasion in his book Ankoku Ron. According to Victor Harris of the British Museum, Nichiren was given credit for the storm (by his supporters), even though he had previously preached that Japan would be destroyed for ignoring him and his teachings about the Lotus Sutra.

== Collections and exhibitions ==
Sketches of the Life of the Great Priest was popular with collectors throughout the 20th century, but it was not until the Victoria and Albert Museum centenary exhibition in 1961 (100 years after Kuniyoshi's death) that the general public became aware of his larger body of work.

The British Museum acquired a full set of the series from multiple collectors, including Arthur Morrison in 1906, Kato Shozo in 1908, and Hogitaro Inada in 1913. Additional prints were donated in 1941 through the Thomas Bates Blow bequest and a donation by Henry Bergen in 1948. In 2008, further prints in the series were donated to the museum from collector Arthur R. Miller. A print of In the Snow at Tsukahara, Sado Island, from their collection was exhibited twice, once at the Kuniyoshi: From the Arthur R. Miller Collection exhibition at the Royal Academy in 2009, and a second time in 2010 at the Graphic Heroes, Magic Monsters: Japanese Prints by Utagawa Kuniyoshi from the Arthur R. Miller Collection exhibition at the Japan Society in New York in 2010.

The Museum of Modern Art (MoMA) hosts a partial set (4/10, plus several alternate prints) of the series collected from several different purchases and bequests. The first print in the series was purchased in 1918. Most of the items from the series in their collection originates with the Henry L. Phillips bequest in 1940. In the Snow at Tsukahara, Sado Island, appeared in the mid-2000s MoMA exhibition "Snow in Ukiyo-e Prints and Paintings". and in the 2023-2024 exhibition "Anxiety and Hope in Japanese Art".

The Baur Foundation holds eight of the ten prints in the series from the collection of Alfred Baur.

The Allen Memorial Art Museum (AMAM) acquired the complete set of prints from the Sketches of the Life of the Great Priest series for their collection from a bequest of 1,500 ukiyo-e woodblock prints by Mary A. Ainsworth in 1950. The museum has featured selected prints from the series in numerous exhibitions and has also shown them internationally.

The Michele and Donald D'Amour Museum of Fine Arts acquired a full set of the prints with a bequest from Raymond Bidwell in 1960.
