= Henry Groves =

Henry Groves may refer to:

- Henry Groves (botanist) (1855–1912), English botanist
- Henry Groves (cricketer) (1896–1992), English cricketer and British Army officer
- Henry Groves & Son, an organ builder in England
