= Henry Groves (botanist) =

English botanist (1855–1912)

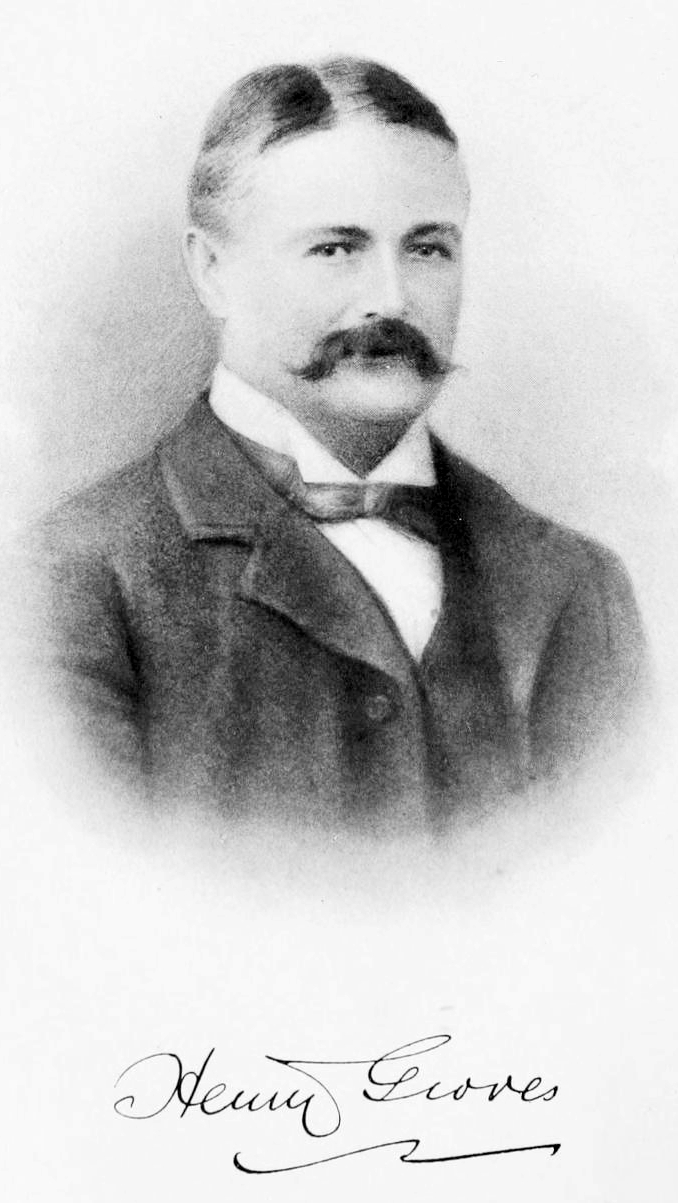

Henry Groves (15 October 1855 – 2 November 1912) was an English botanist who specialized in the algae belonging to the order Charales.

== Life ==
Groves was born on 15 October 1855 in London. With his brother James, he studied at Godalming Grammar School in Surrey. Here they were introduced to natural history by the Principal, Peter Churton. In 1869 their father died. With three children, his mother needed support; and Henry went to work in the London office of a stockbroker who was a family friend.

In the early 1870s, a chance meeting with the family of John Edward Sowerby led Groves to a deeper interest in English botany and the works of the late botanist. In 1874 the brothers joined the South London Microscopical and Natural History Club where they met botanists including Thomas Bates Blow. They made a botanical excursion to Thames Ditton with Hewett Cottrell Watson and Blow, and visited the botanical section of the British Museum. From 1877, the two brothers took a keen interest in British Characeae. They also took an interest in molluscs. Henry left the stockbroker office after the death of the owner in 1879. In 1880 the two brothers published a review of the British Characeae. In 1884, Henry became Secretary of the South London Microscopical and Natural History Club until the club was dissolved in 1897. Henry was admitted Fellow of the Linnean Society in 1892 where his knowledge of financial matters helped the organization.

In 1907, Henry became a Trustee at the South London Botanical Institute. In 1909 he visited France and in 1910 Belgium.

Henry was married in 1896 and they had a daughter. He died after a long illness on 2 November 1912.

With his brother James Groves he issued the exsiccata work Characeae Britannicae exsiccatae, e distributione H. et J. Groves (1892-1900).
