= Ukai (play) =

Noh play attributed to Enami no Sayemon

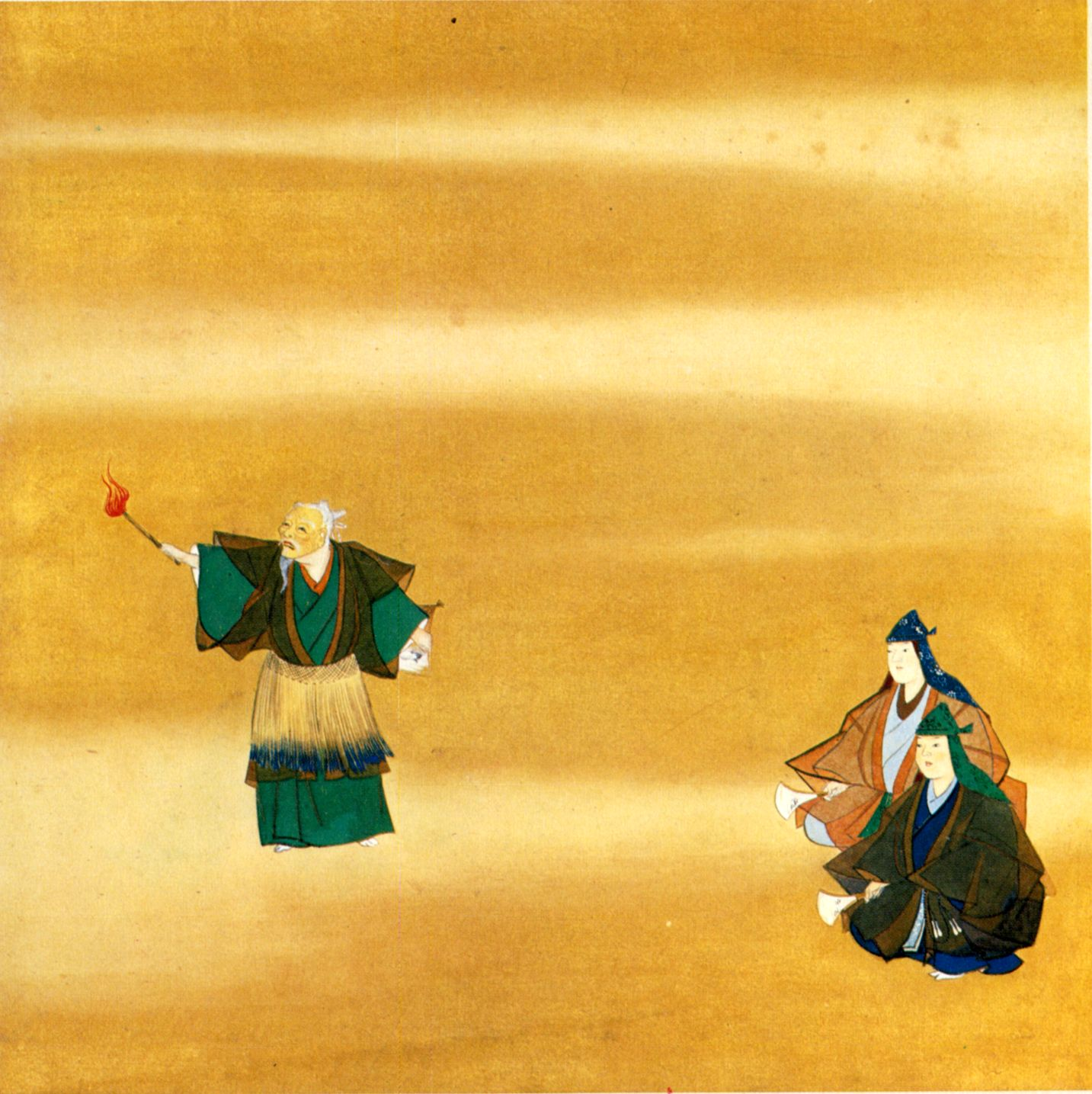
Noh - Ukai

Ukai (The Cormorant-Fisher) is a Noh play of around 1400, attributed to Enami no Sayemon.

Because of the lowly occupation of the leading character, Ukai is known as one of the Three Ignoble Plays.

== Plot ==
Two travelling monks meet a cormorant fisher at the Isawa River. Though unable to persuade the fisher to abandon his life-taking trade, one of the monks remembers having received a meal from a cormorant fisher a few years back. The old fisherman explains that that cormorant fisher had since been killed for practicing his trade, before revealing himself as the cormorant fisherman's ghost.

The ghost then re-enacts the sinful pursuit that still ties him to the material world: "In the joy of capture/ Forgotten sin and forfeit/ Of the life hereafter!". After he leaves, the priest enacts a rite for his soul, before Yama, King of Hell appears, to proclaim that the fisherman has been freed from his sins: "because he once gave lodging to a priest...The fisher's boat is changed to the ship of Buddha's vows".

== Literary associations ==
- The Kyogen play, 'The Bird-Catcher in Hell', parodies much in the plot of Ukai.
- Basho described the world of Ukai in his haiku: "How exciting for a while, / The cormorant fishing-boat! / Then depressing".

== See also ==
- Cormorant fishing
- Lotus Sutra
