= Kishi Ganku =

Japanese painter (1749–1839)

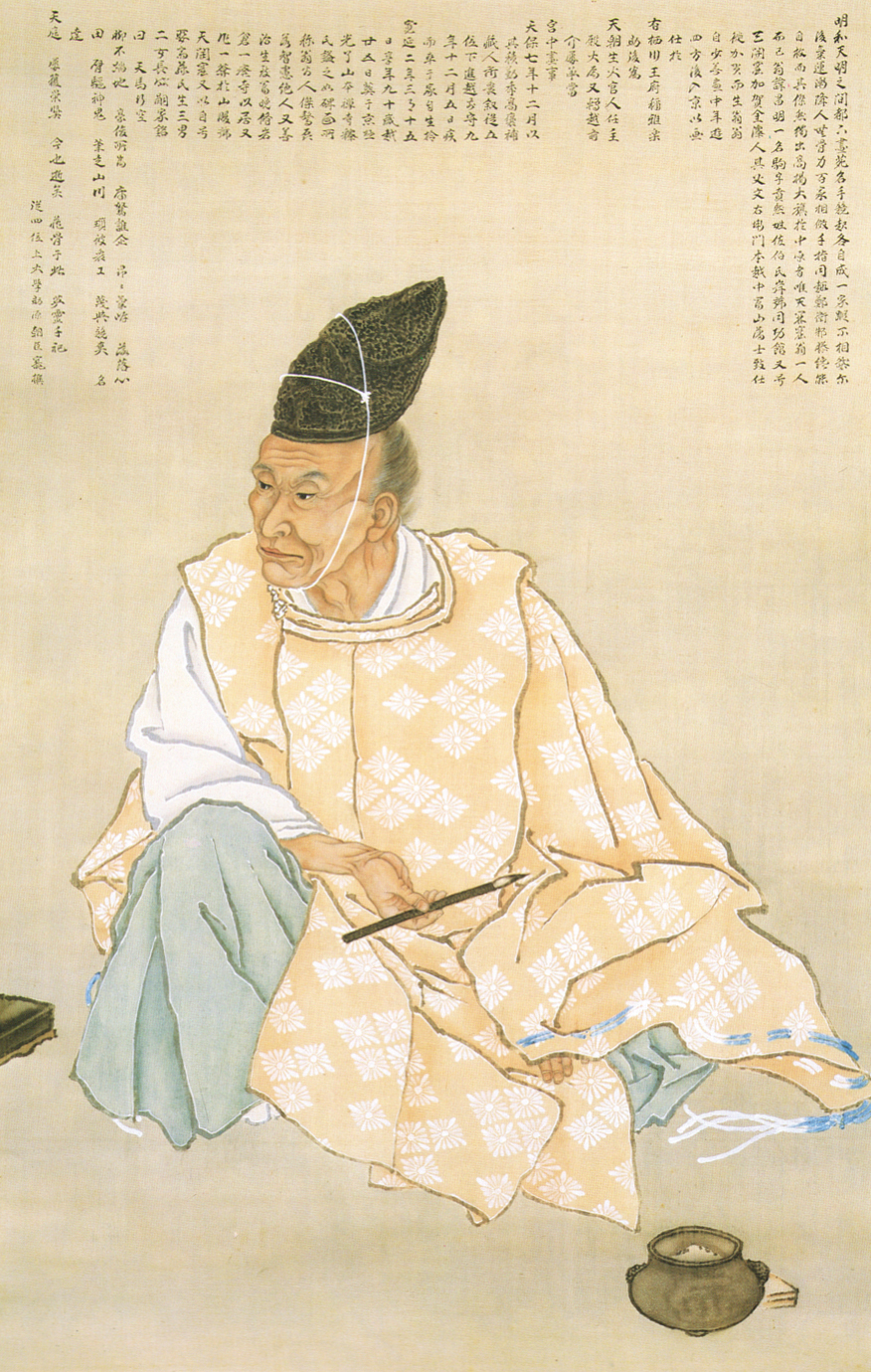
Self-portrait

Ganku 岸駒 (1749 – January 19, 1839), or more formally Kishi Ku, was a leading Japanese painter of Kyoto and founder of the Kishi school of painting. He is famous for his paintings of tigers. Ganku was born in Kanazawa as Kishi Saeki, studied painting styles including those of Chinese painter Shen Nanpin (沈南蘋) and the Maruyama-Shijō school, and arrived in Kyoto around 1780.

By the late 18th century, Ganku's paintings were appreciated by patrons that included the imperial family, leading to a position under Prince Arisugawa. His students included his son, Gantai 岸岱 (1782–1865), son-in-law Ganryou 岸良 (1797–1852), adopted son Renzan 連山 (1804–59), Yokoyama Kazan 横山華山 (1784–1837), Shirai Kayou 白井華陽 (fl. ca 1840–60), and Kawamura Bumpou 河村文鳳 (1779–1821). He was made honorary governor of Echizen (Echizen no kami, 越前守) toward the end of his life.

Ganku died on January 19, 1839, in Kyoto.

== Gallery ==
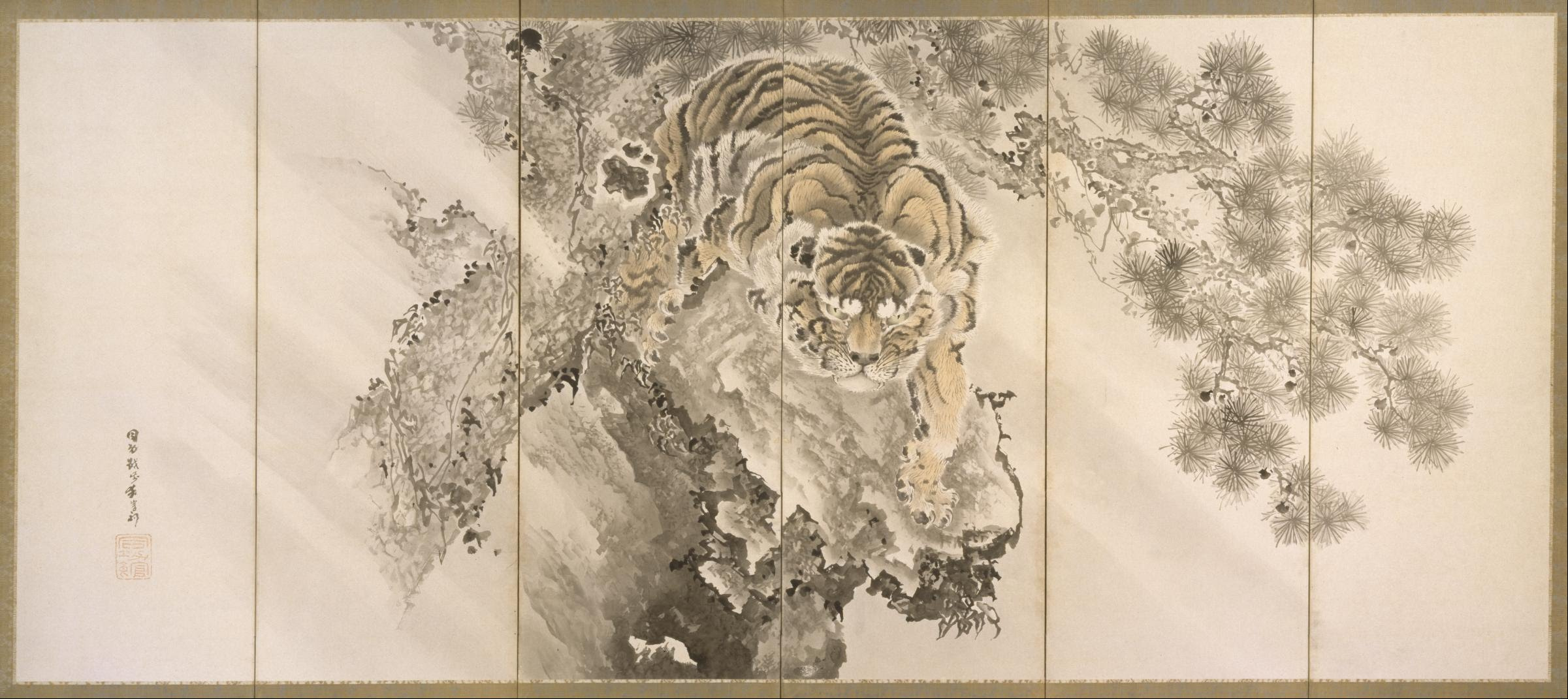
Screen with Tiger

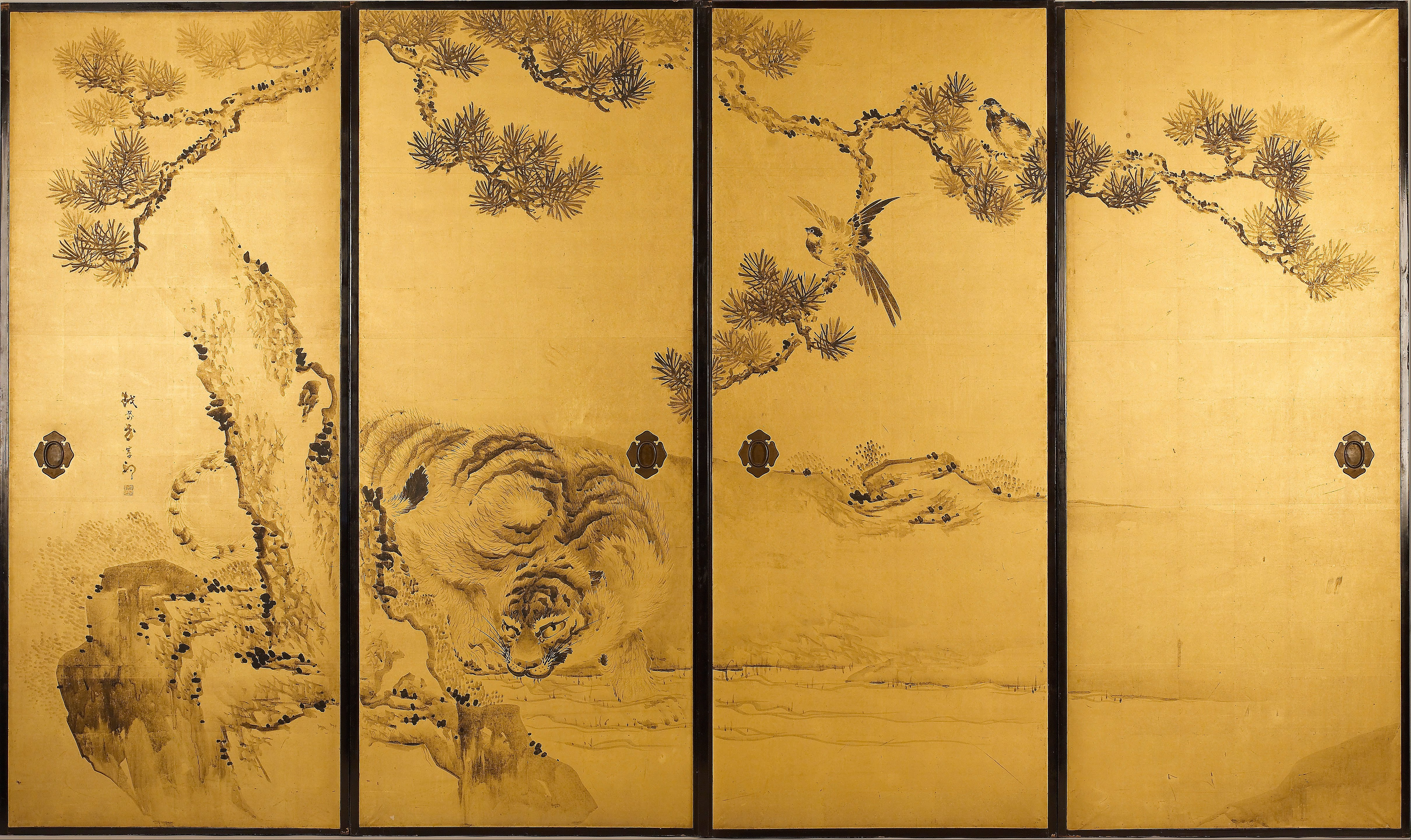
Tigers and Dragon, c. 1813-1838

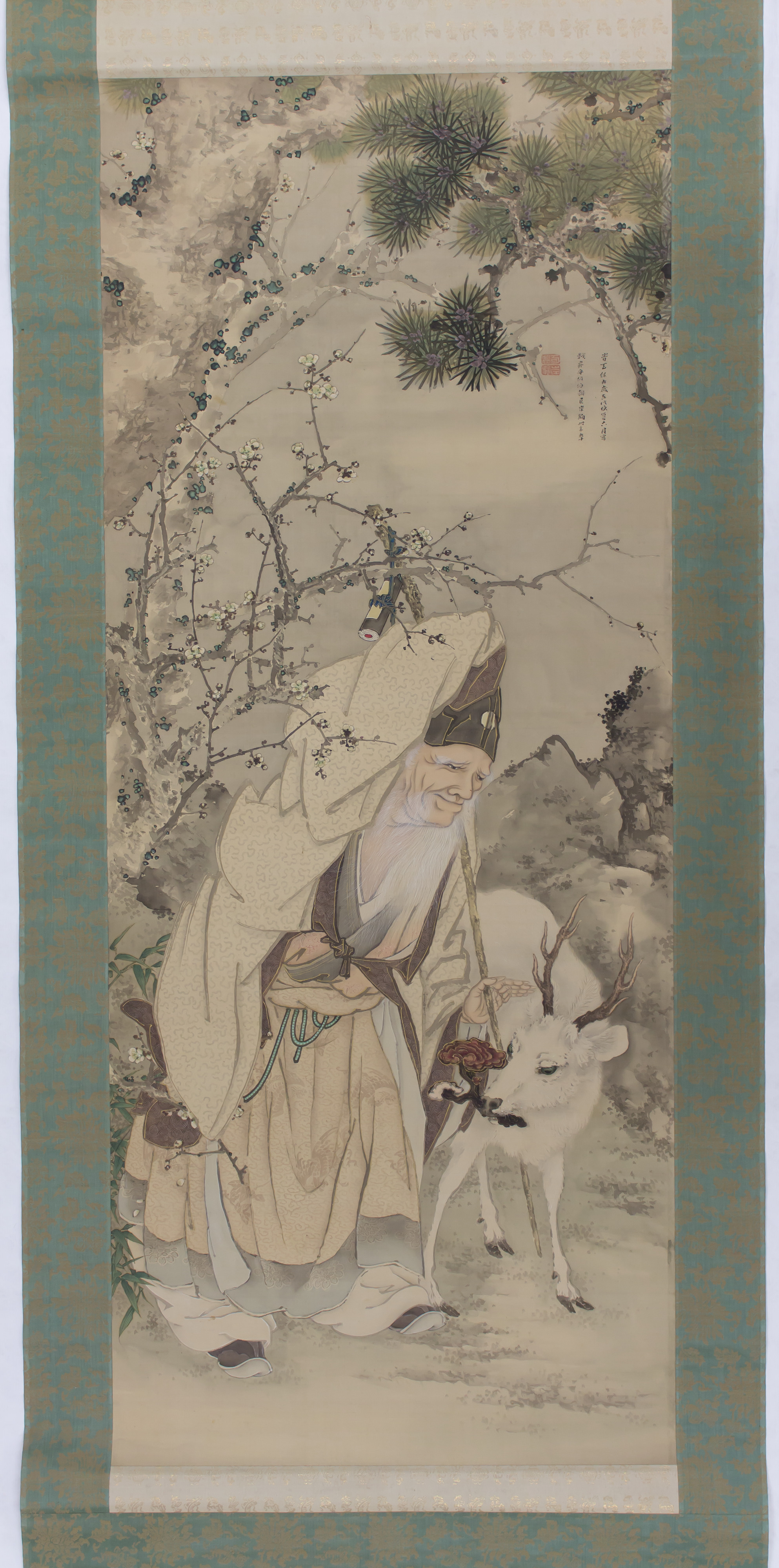
Jurōjin, 1838

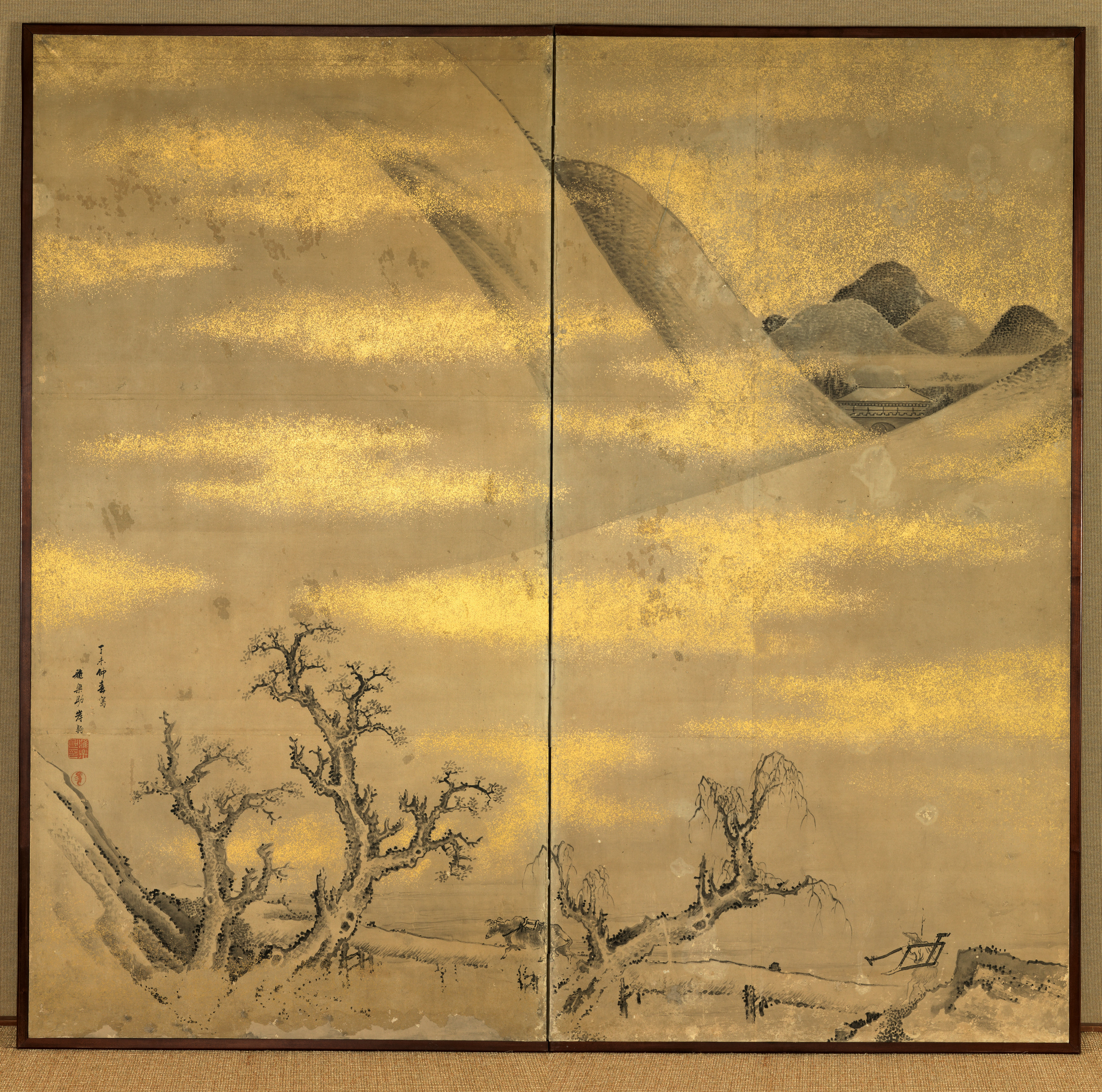
Spring Landscape

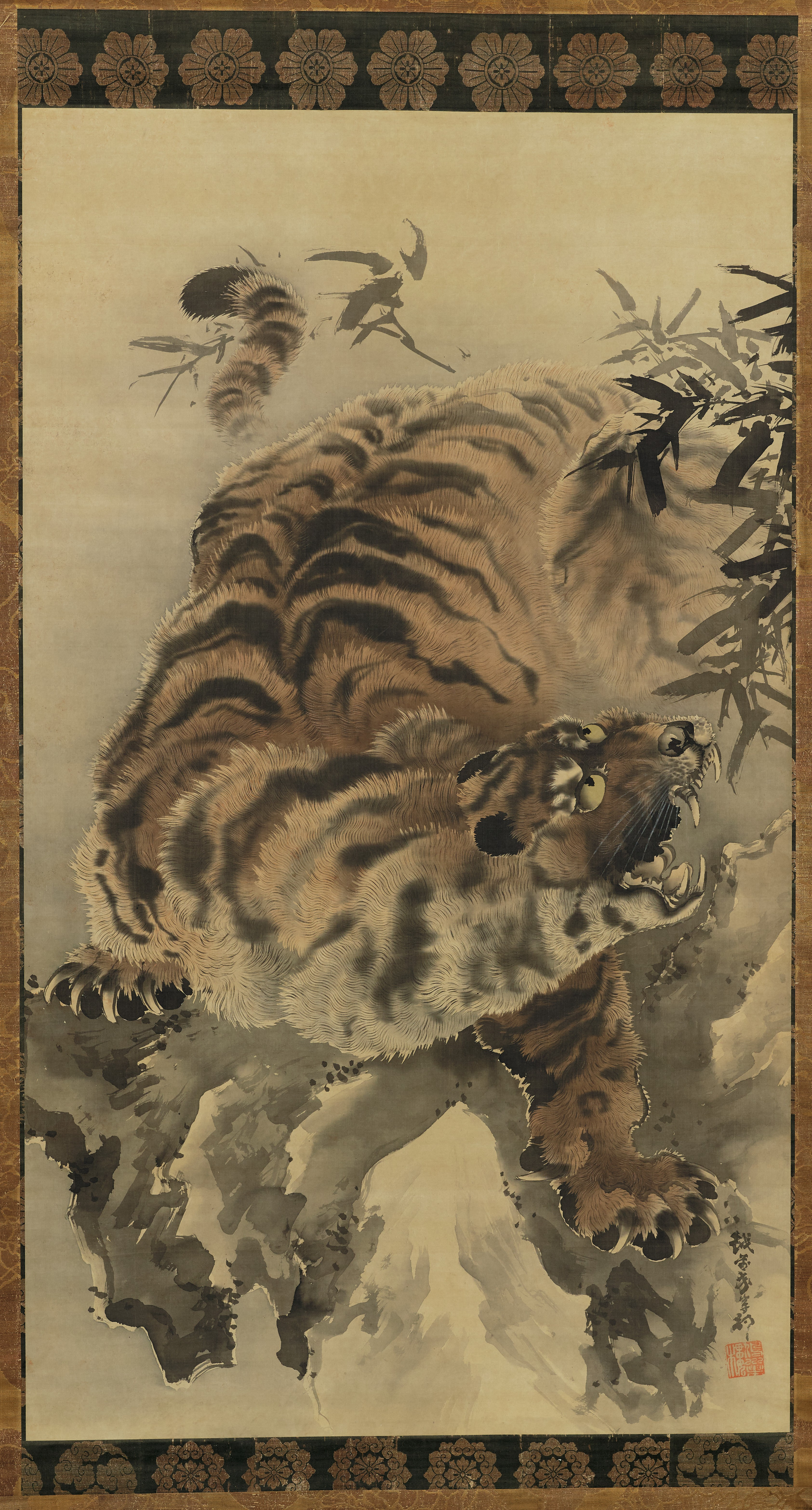
Tiger and Bamboo

== References and external links ==
- Encyclopædia Britannica
- Answers.com
- JAANUS biography
