= Cormorant fishing =

Fishing using trained cormorants to catch large fish

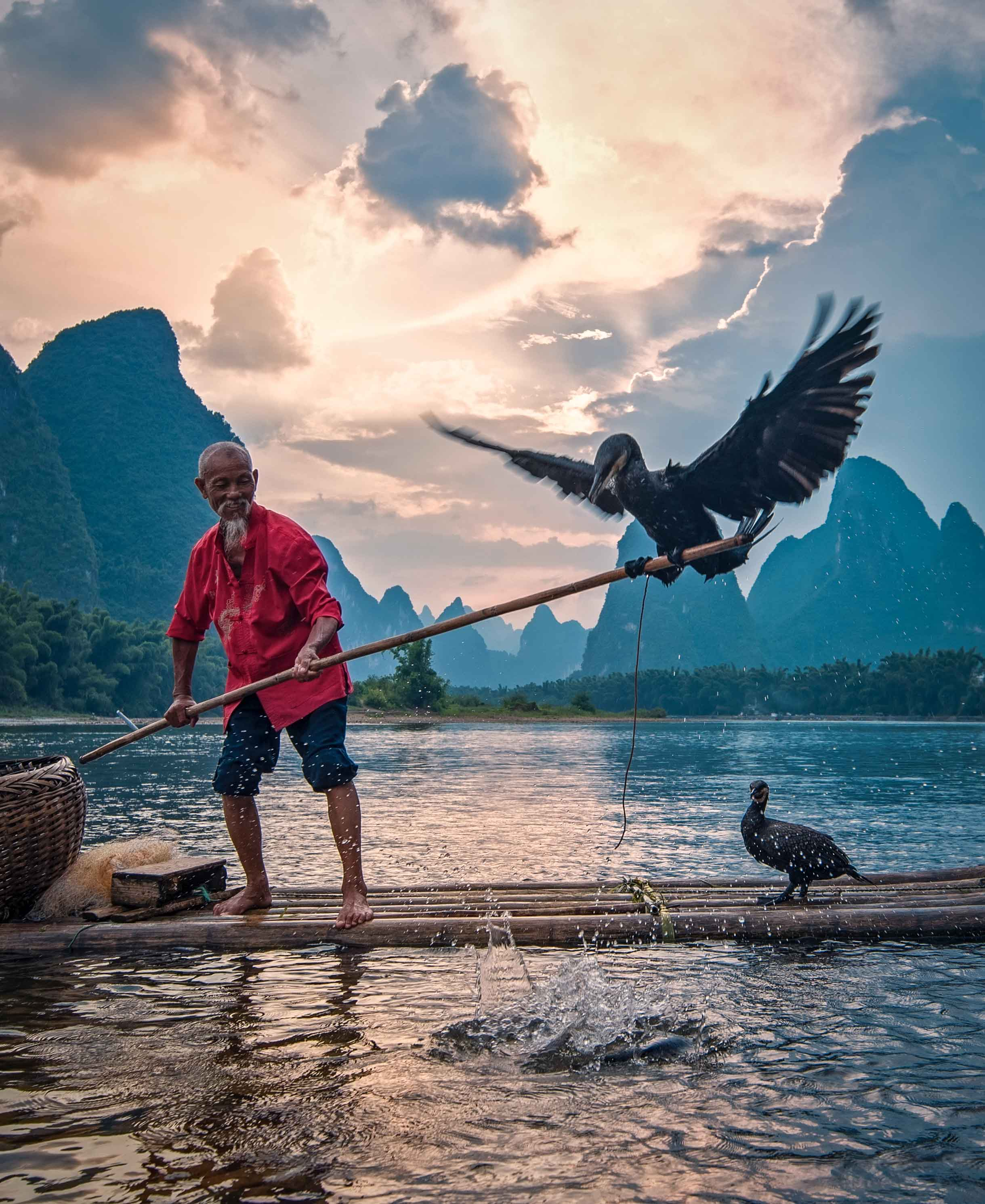
Yangshuo cormorant fisherman

Cormorant fishing is a traditional fishing technique in which fishermen use trained cormorants to catch fish in rivers. Historically, cormorant fishing has taken place in China and Japan, as well as Greece, North Macedonia, and briefly, England and France. Sometimes known as "duck fishing," it was attested as a method used by the ancient Japanese in the Book of Sui, the official history of the Sui dynasty of China, completed in 636 CE. It has significant cultural roots in Asia, specifically in China where it has been practiced for over one thousand years. It is only in China that cormorants have been fully domesticated. Though cormorant fishing was once a successful enterprise, its primary use today is the tourism industry. This artisan fishing method is no longer in commercial use except in southwestern China, where it is under threat from more modern methods.

To control the birds, the fishermen tie a loose snare near the base of the bird's throat. The snare does not stop the bird from swallowing small fish, but prevents the bird from swallowing larger fish, which are held temporarily in their gullet. When a cormorant has caught a fish in its throat, the fisherman brings the bird back to the boat and has it regurgitate the fish.

The types of cormorants used differ based on the location. Chinese fishermen typically employ the great cormorant (Phalacrocorax carbo), while the Japanese cormorant (Phalacrocorax capillatus) is used in Japan and the neotropic cormorant (Nannopterum brasilianum) in Peru. Darters (birds in the genus Anhinga), which are relatives of cormorants, are also used for this fishing technique on occasion. For cormonant fisherman, this practice is a longstanding tradition, their primary livelihood, and an economic activity. In Asia, cormorants are highly honored and protected. Before the 19th century in Japan, the emperor issued a decree protecting cormorant fishing in Gifu Prefecture by the Imperial Household Department.

Cormorant fishing was historically important in several countries around the world. Cormorant fishing practices influenced Asian literature, fine arts, culinary practices, and general recreation.

== China ==
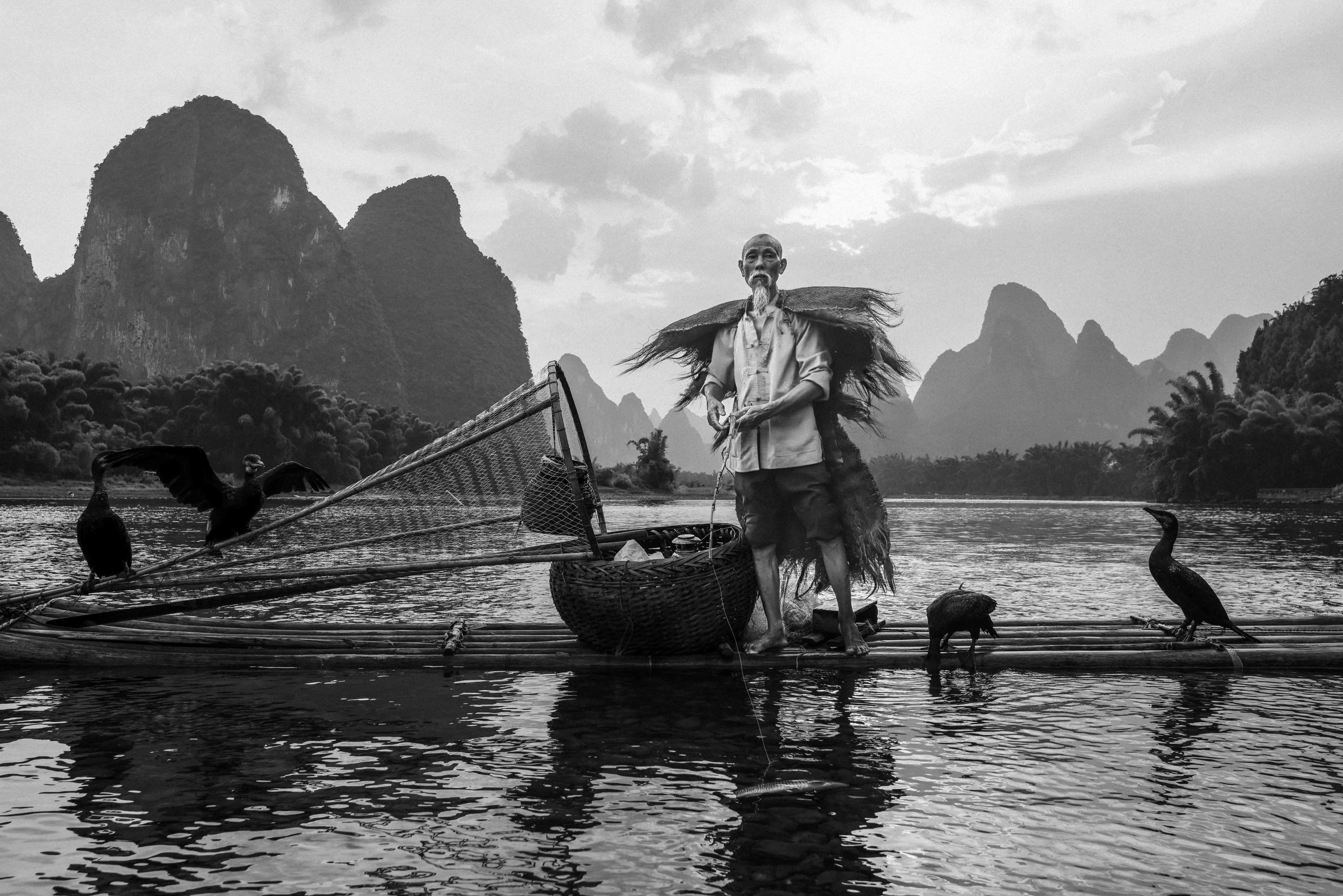
Chinese cormorant fisherman in Yangshuo

In Guilin, Guangxi, cormorants are famous for fishing on the shallow Lijiang River. Elsewhere in southern China, the Bai people have utilized cormorant fishing since the 9th century on the banks of Erhai Lake. Traditionally practised for sustenance, cormorant fishing is now primarily performed for tourists.

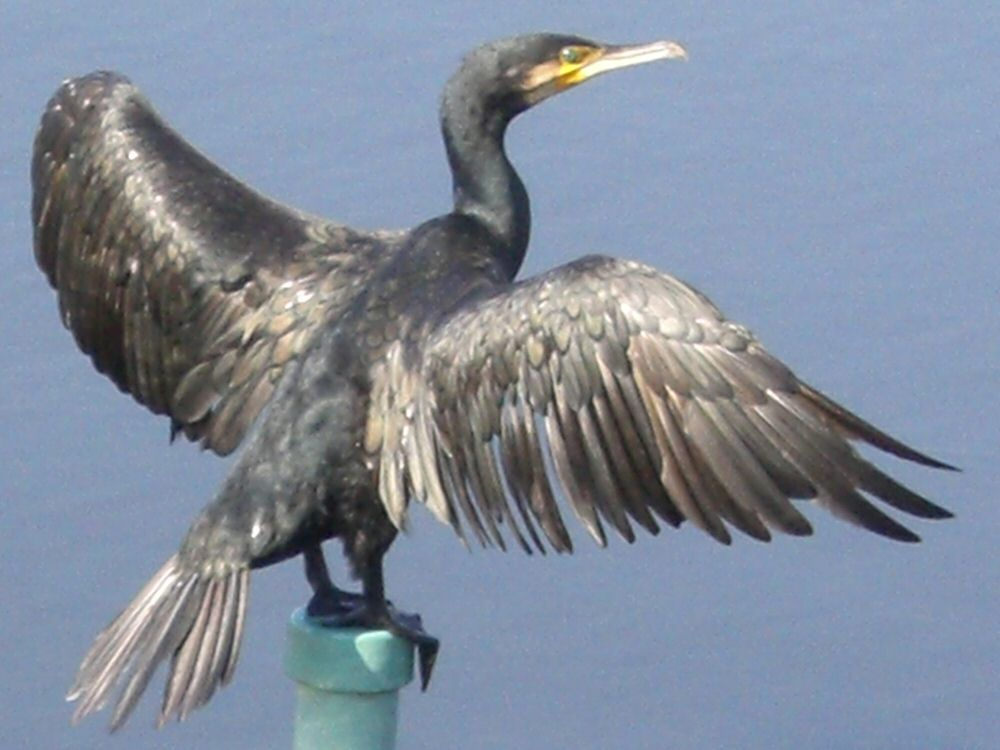
Great cormorants are typically used by Chinese fishers

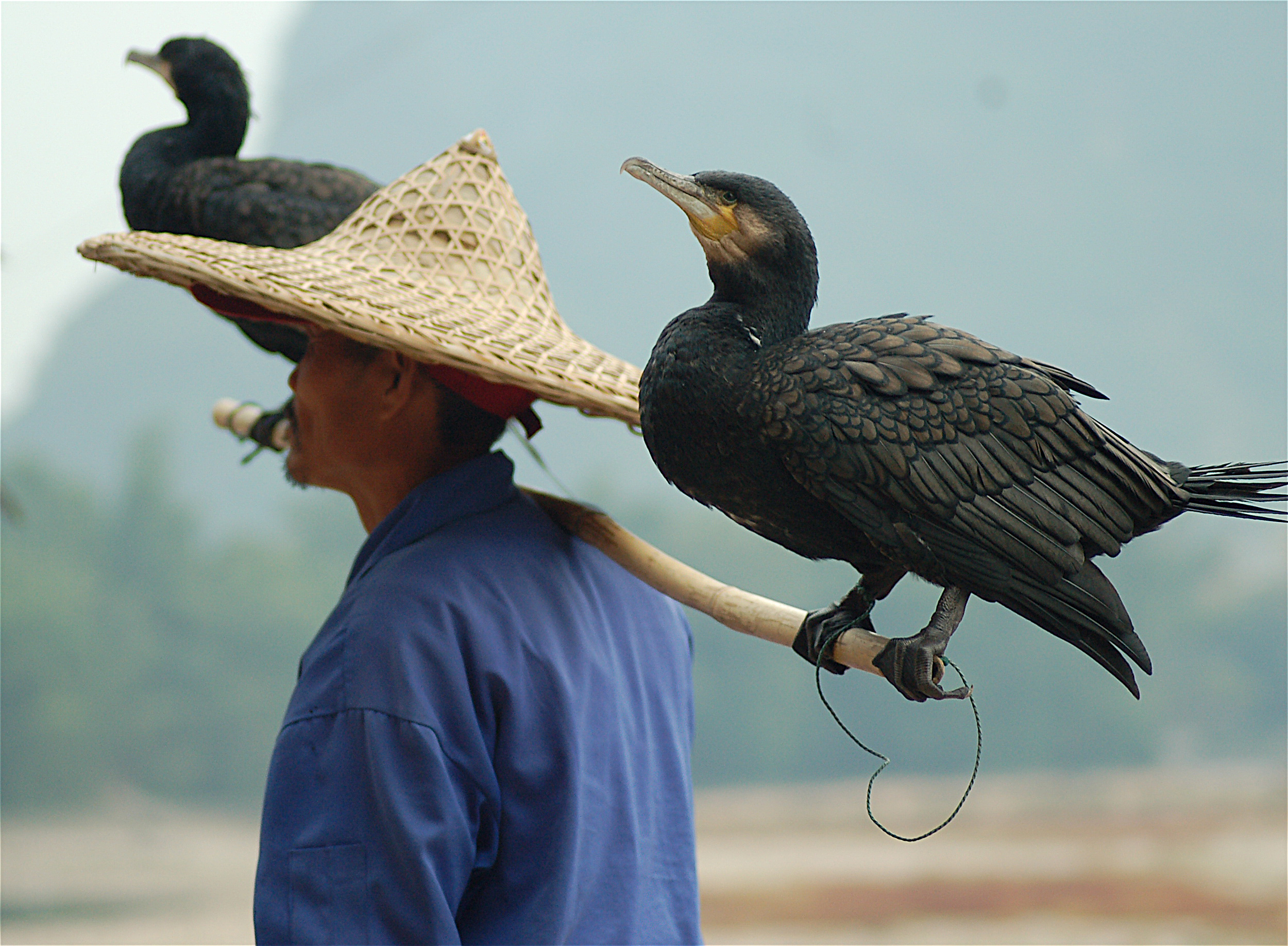
Chinese fisherman with his cormorants

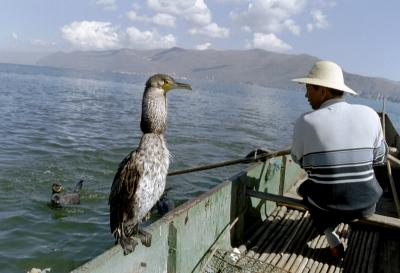
Chinese fisherman with one of his cormorants on Erhai Lake near Dali, Yunnan. The bird's throat snare is visible via the constriction in the bird's neck.

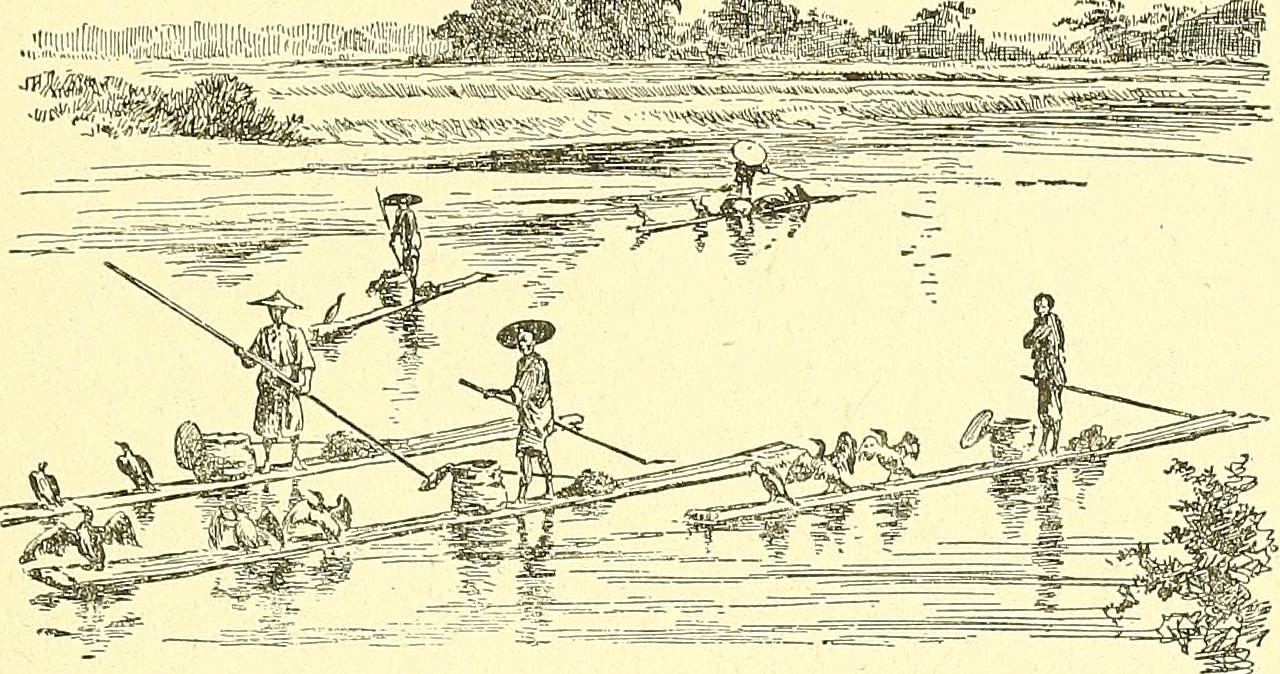
Fishing with cormorants in China, c. 1894

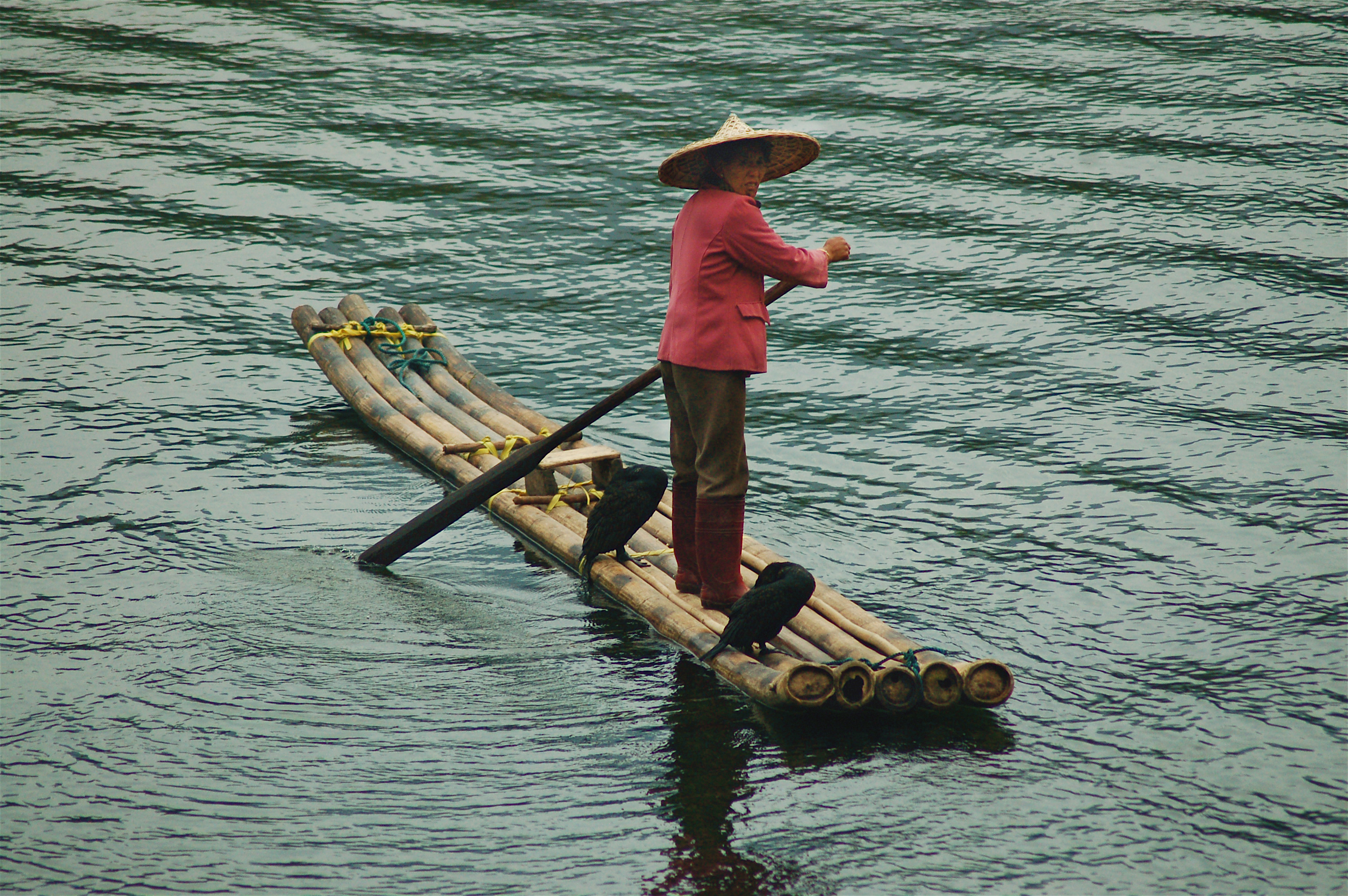
Chinese cormorant fisherman traditionally use bamboo boats

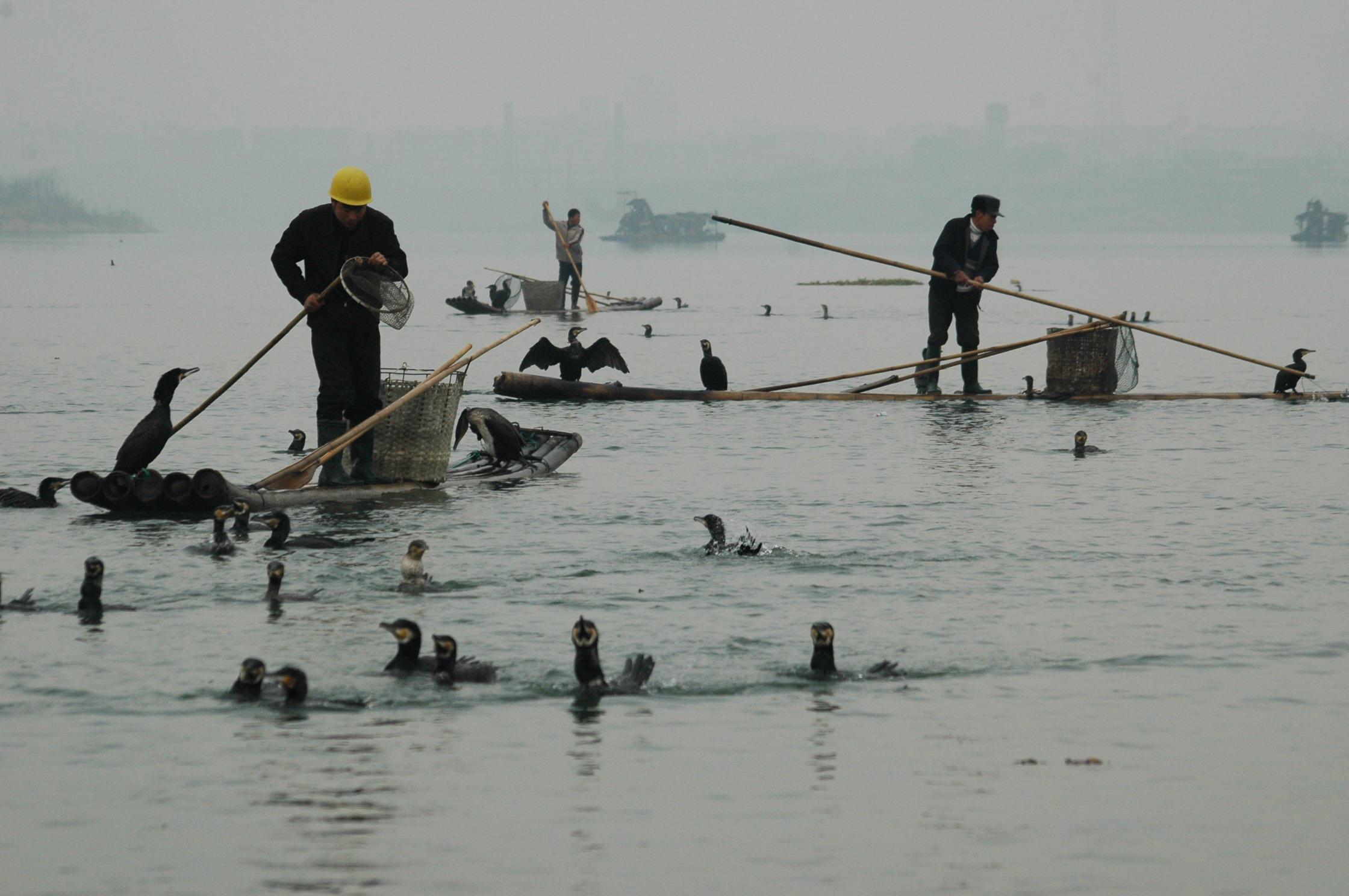
Contemporary fishing with cormorants on Poyang Lake, China

== Japan ==
Cormorant fishing in Japan is called ukai (鵜飼) in Japanese. Originally, it was done as one of the main fishing methods for ayu (sweetfish) fishing. However, since it is "unique" (as it uses birds and skillful techniques), viewing cormorant fishing, since the Heian period, has been used as amusement for aristocratic classes and warlords in Japan.

Oda Nobunaga started showing cormorant fishing for hospitality in Japan. In 1568, Oda Nobunaga, welcoming a messenger from Takeda Shingen, made a new boat and invited the messenger as a guest to show cormorant fishing. In addition, he chose ayu (sweetfish) with his own eyes and sent it to the guest as a gift at a later date. Tokugawa Ieyasu, after the Summer Campaign (1615) Siege of Osaka, visited Gifu, where he enjoyed seeing cormorant fishing and eating ayu. Thus, masters of cormorant fishing began to offer ayu sushi to the Shogun and were allowed to move freely over the river.

Cormorant fishing currently takes place in 13 cities in Japan. The most famous location is Gifu, Gifu Prefecture, home to cormorant fishing on the Nagara River, which has continued uninterrupted for the past 1,300 years. Cormorant fishing in Seki also takes place on the Nagara River, but it is called 'Oze cormorant fishing' (小瀬鵜飼 Oze Ukai). Only the cormorant fishing masters in Gifu and Seki are employed by the emperor and called Imperial Fishermen of the Imperial Household Agency.

- Fuefuki, Yamanashi Prefecture (Fuefuki River)
- Gifu, Gifu Prefecture (Nagara River)
- Seki, Gifu Prefecture (Nagara River)
- Inuyama, Aichi Prefecture (Kiso River)
- Uji, Kyoto Prefecture (Uji River)
- Kyoto, Kyoto Prefecture (Ōi River)
- Arida, Wakayama Prefecture (Arida River)
- Miyoshi, Hiroshima Prefecture (Basen River)
- Masuda, Shimane Prefecture (Takatsu River)
- Iwakuni, Yamaguchi Prefecture (Nishiki River)
- Ōzu, Ehime Prefecture (Hiji River)
- Hita, Ōita Prefecture (Mikuma River)
- Asakura, Fukuoka Prefecture (Chikugo River)
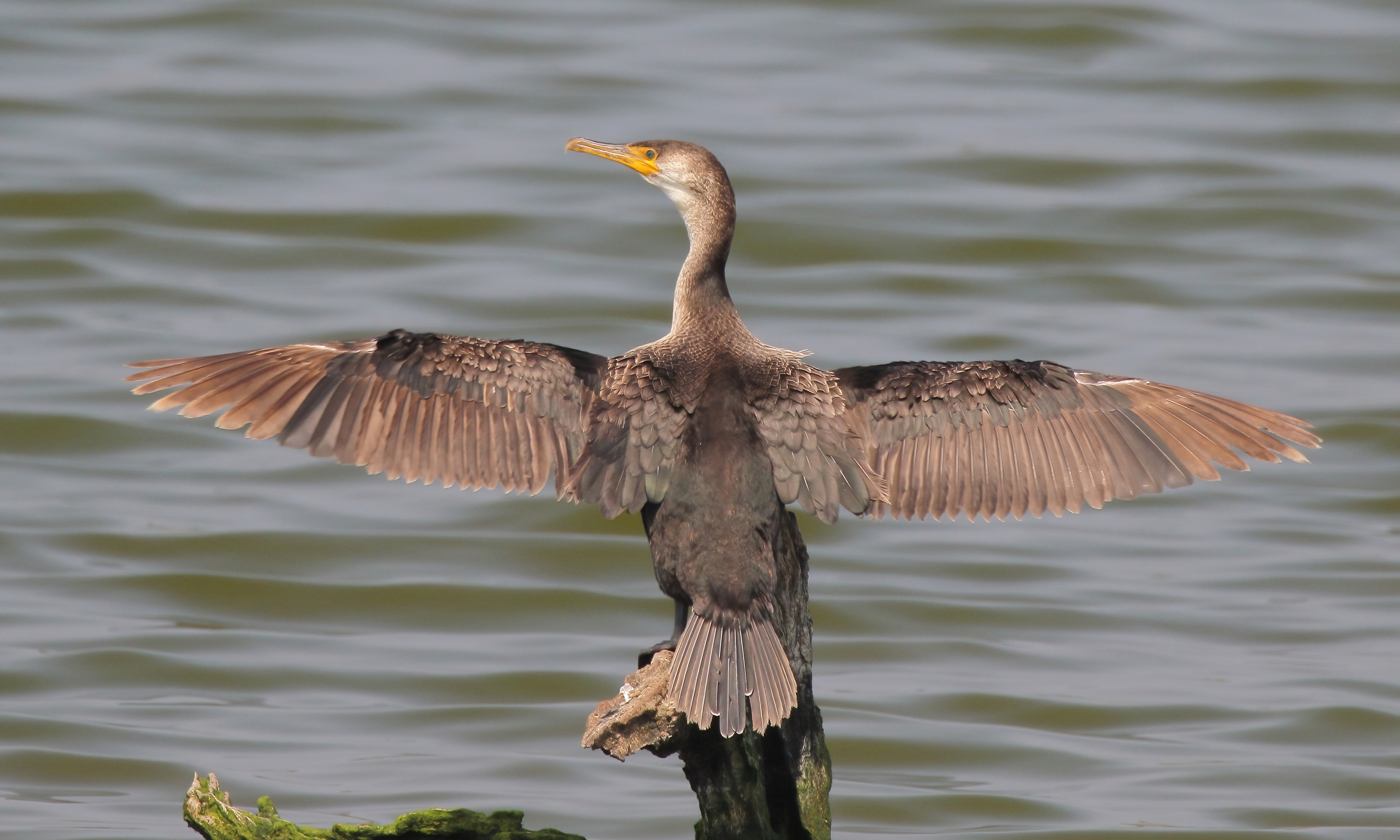
Japanese cormorants are typically used by Japanese fishers.

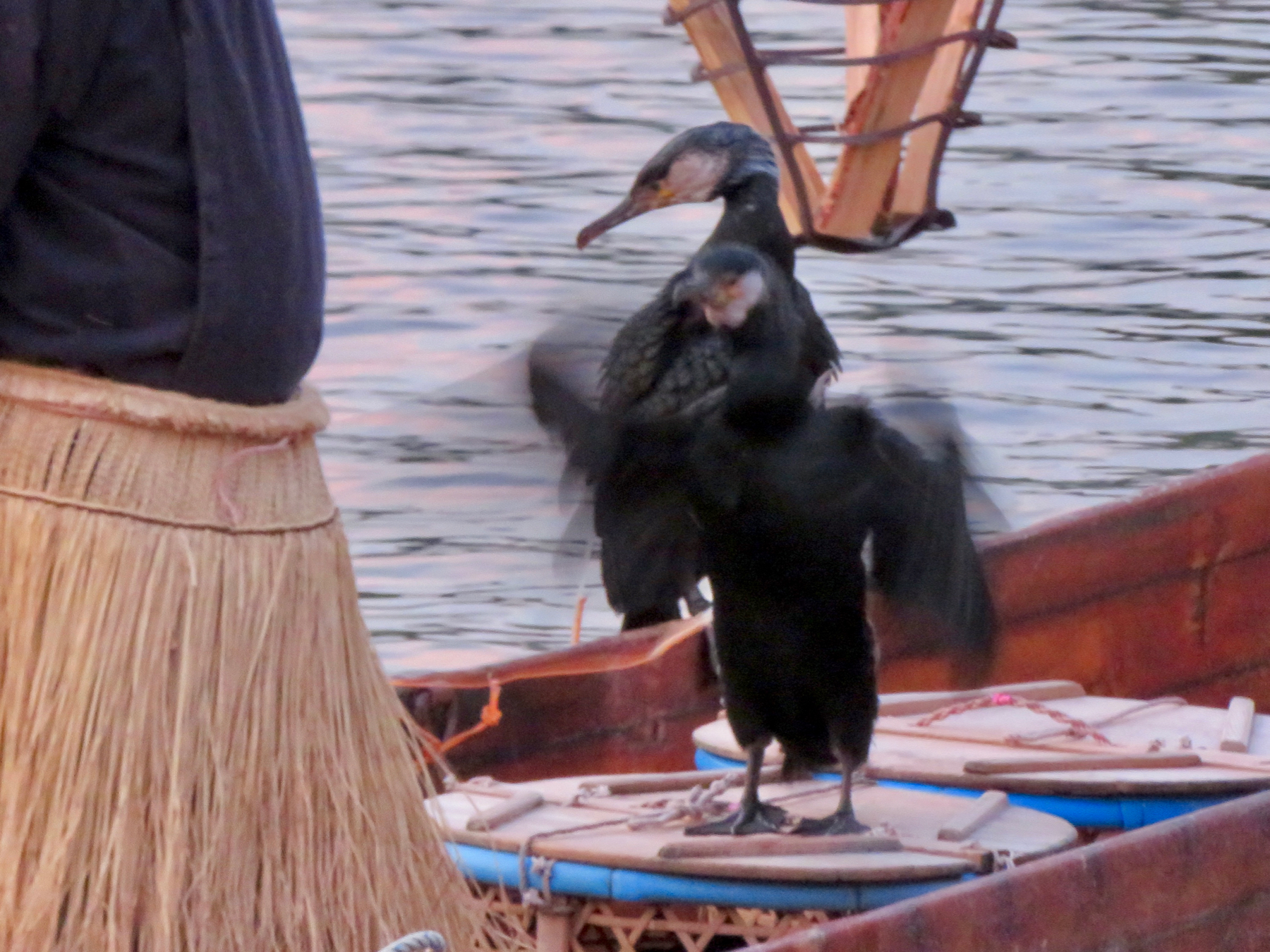
Japanese cormorant trained by its master in Japan

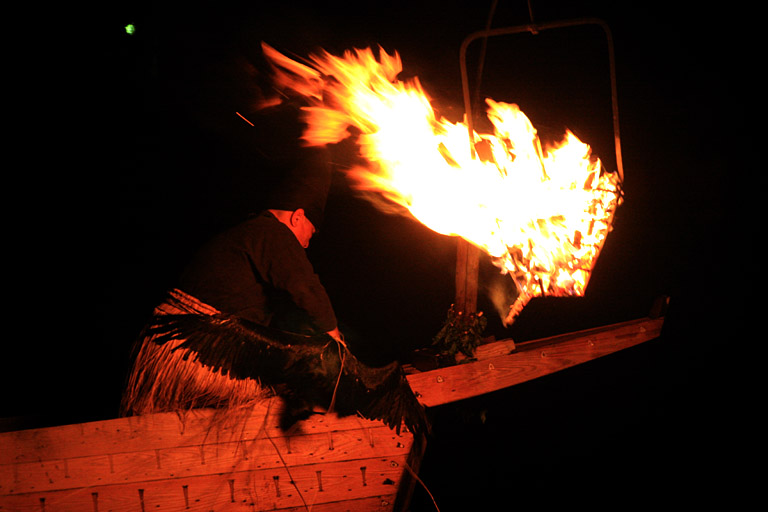
Cormorant fishing master on a boat at night in Gifu, Japan

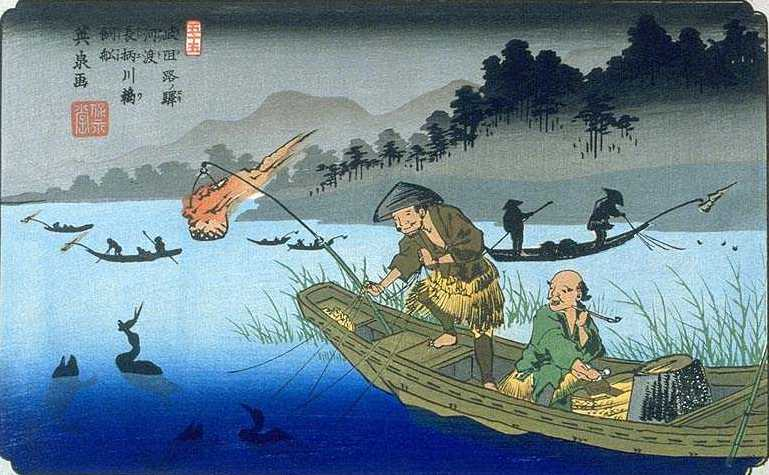
Keisai Eisen's print of cormorant fishing on the Nagara River during the Edo period

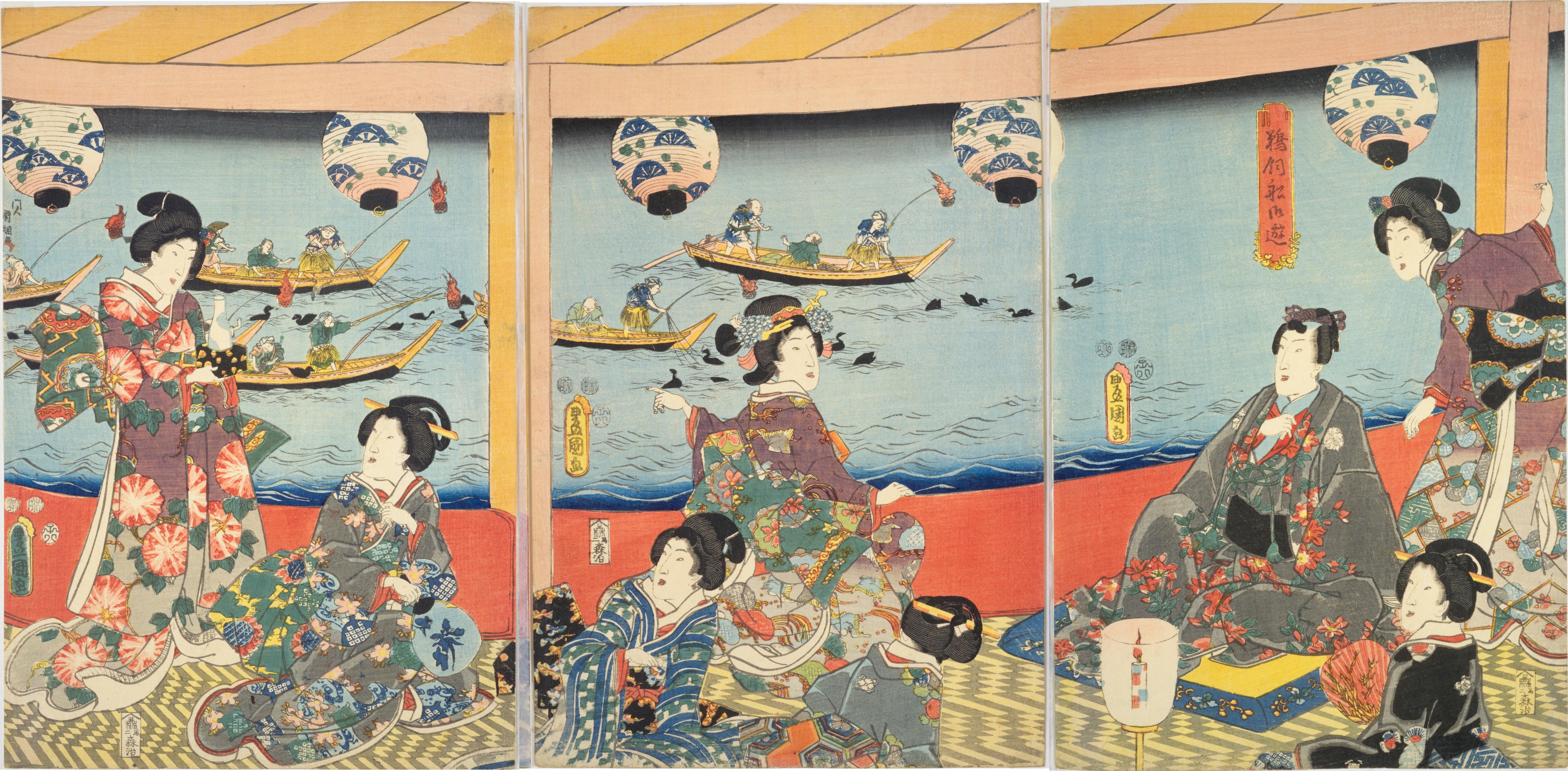
Viewing of cormorant fishing as an amusement (a woodblock print of Utagawa Kunisada, 1852)

== Peru ==
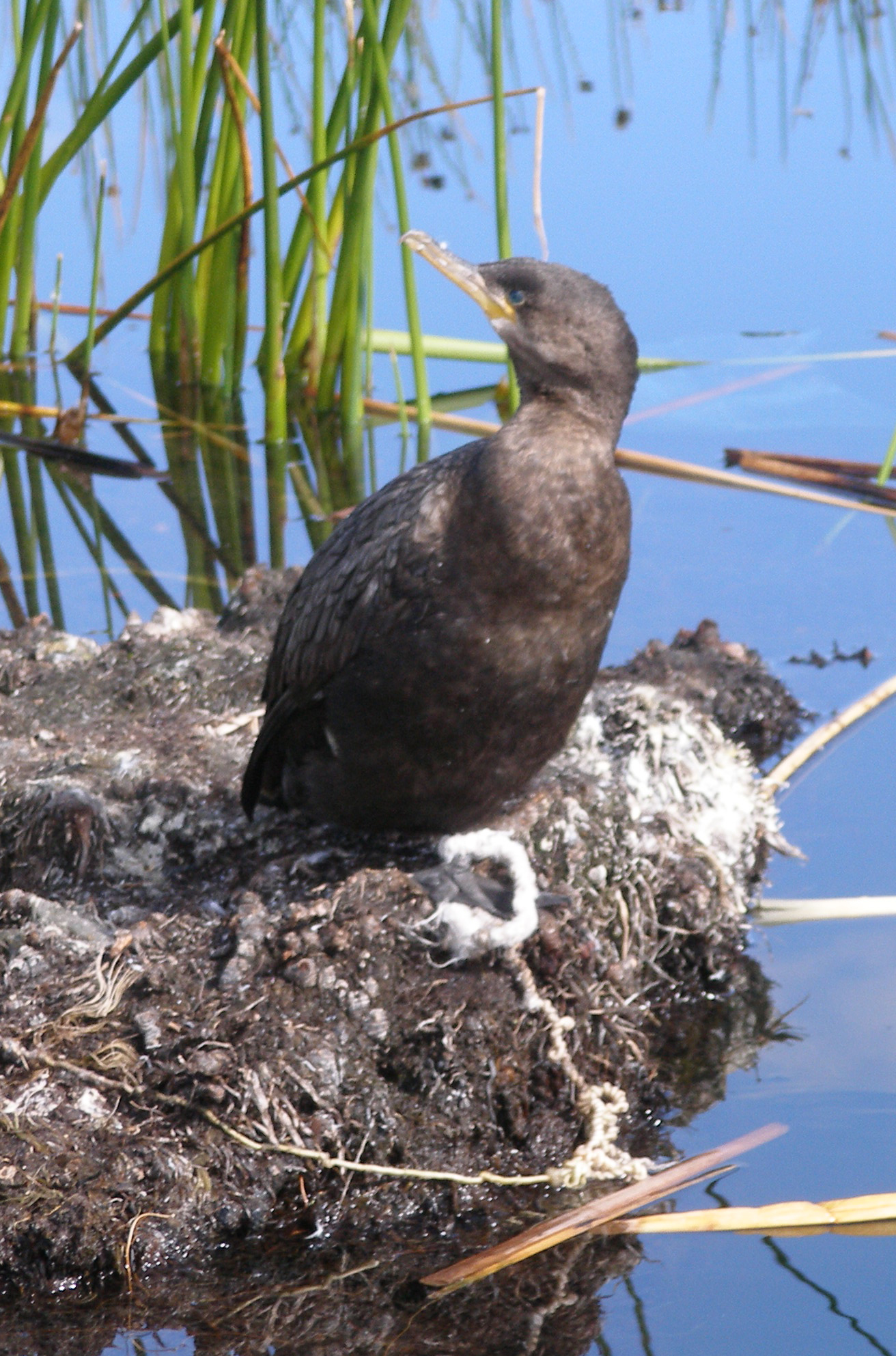
Tethered cormorant used for fishing on Lake Titicaca

Cormorants are used for fishing on Lake Titicaca by the Uru people in Peru. There are claims cormorant fishing occurred in Peru during the 5th century, 100 years earlier than Japan. This claims have been debated in recent years.

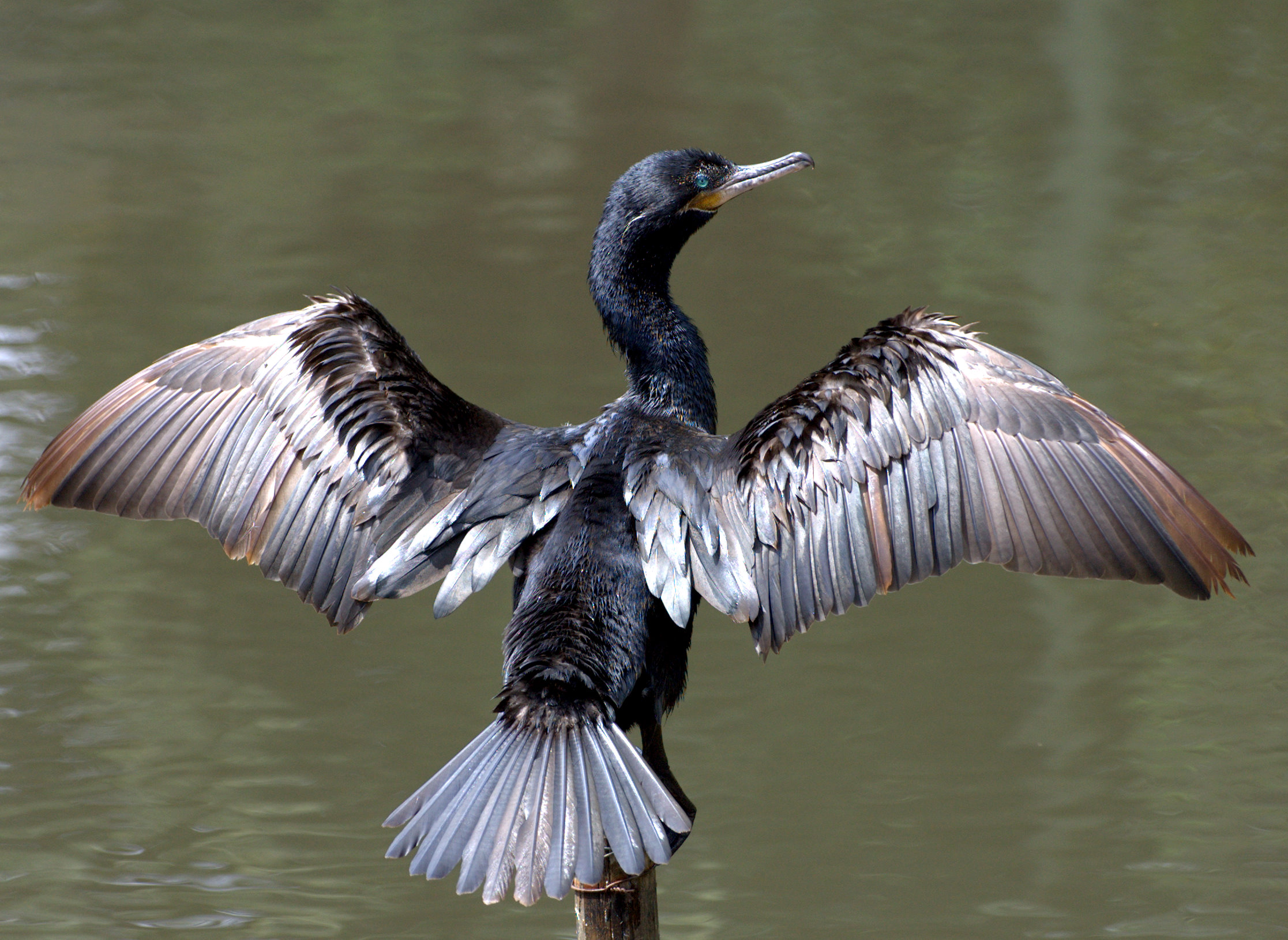
The neotropic cormorant is used for fishing in Peru

== Europe ==
Cormorant fishing is an old tradition in Greece and North Macedonia, especially on Doiran Lake which lies in the border of the two countries, and it is still practiced today by some traditional fishermen. In Western Europe, cormorant fishing took place from the 16th to 17th centuries, primarily in England and France. In the 19th century, Francis Henry Salvin reintroduced the practice in England by putting on displays and bringing his birds to fisheries exhibitions. This "second phase" of English cormorant fishing lasted until about 1890.

== See also ==
- Otter fishing
- Cormorant fishing on the Nagara River
- Ukai (play)
