= Thomas Bates Blow =

Thomas Bates Blow (8 November 1853 – 16 January 1941) was a British botanist, apiculture equipment manufacturer, photographer, and a student of Japanese culture. He also spread use of the car, photography and bee-keeping techniques in Japan.

Blow was born in Welwyn, Hertfordshire, to carpenter James and Mary Blow. After education at a village school he went to study at Tring where he became interested in languages, photography, botany and bee-keeping. He set up a photography workshop at Welwyn and also manufactured bee-keeping equipment. He also took an interest in plants and maintained a herbarium which he donated in 1872. He wrote on the plants of Hitchin and established a Hertfordshire Bee Society. In 1884 he was elected a Fellow of the Linnean Society. He built his home next to Welwyn North station in 1891. He travelled widely, visiting the West Indies and Sri Lanka in the 1880s and to Japan in 1896. He wrote on bee-keeping on his tour through Japan and made contact with the Japanese authorities involved in overseeing agriculture and apiculture. He met Ernest Satow and visited several times, also collecting plants en route in India. In 1901 he married Koyake Shoko and from 1902 he lived in Kyoto where he used the first automobile on the Kyoto streets. By 1906 he was known for dealing in Japanese cultural artefacts. He also took photographs from across Japan and held exhibitions. He continued to interact with Japanese apiculturists and exchanging techniques. He wrote A Bee-Keeper's Experience in the East (1883). He also wrote on motoring in Japan. He brought back Japanese bee queens for crossbreeding with British bees. During World War I he moved to Europe and served in the French Red Cross as an ambulance driver at the Hôpital de L’Alliance in Yvetot. He made use of his own 15–20 h.p. Studebaker as an ambulance. He was knighted Chevalier de la Légion d’Honneur in 1918. He continued his botanical collection tours and one of the algae discovered from his collections was named after him as Nitella blowiana. He collaborated with Alfred Baur in collecting Japanese art and print works. He bequeathed his collections of Japanese prints to the British Museum. His estate was valued at around £4509.
