= Maxakalí language =

Macro-Jê language spoken in Brazil

Maxakalí
- Tikmũũn yĩy ax Mãxakani yĩy ax
- Pronunciation: [tɪjmɨ̃ˈʔ̰ɨ̃ɰ̃ə̯̃ ɲɪ̃j̃ ʔɑj] [tɪjk˺mɯ̃ʔˈɯ̃ɜ̯ ̃n˺ɲɪ̃ j̃ ɲˈaj] [mɒ̃tɕakaˈd̪i ɲɪ̃j̃ ʔɑj]
- Native to: Brazil
- Region: Minas Gerais
- Ethnicity: Maxakali
- Native speakers: 2,076 (2014)
- Language family: Macro-Jê: Maxakalían; Maxakalí group; Maxakalí

Official status
- Official language in: Brazil (Teófilo Otoni)

Language codes
- ISO 639-3: mbl
- Glottolog: maxa1247
- ELP: Maxakalí
- Maxakali is classified as Vulnerable by the UNESCO Atlas of the World's Languages in Danger

Maxakalí (Maxakalí: Tikmũũn yĩy ax', Mãxakani yĩy ax) is a Maxakalían language spoken in four villages in Minas Gerais, Brazil, by more than 2,000 people.It is the primary language of the Maxakalí people. There is no known dialectal variation within Maxakalí. The language is characterized by a unique phonology, including vowel lowering and backing, and the absence of fricatives and nasals. Maxakalí typically follows a Subject-Object-Verb (SOV) word order, and verbs are inflected for mood. The Maxakalí lexicon includes verbal number, noun compounding, and lexical borrowings from Língua Geral varieties and Brazilian Portuguese.

== Dialects ==
No dialectal differences are known. Extinct varieties such as Kapoxó, Kumanaxó, Makuní, Panháme, and the 19th century "Maxakalí", which were sometimes taken to be dialects of Maxakalí, are now generally considered to represent a distinct variety of the Maxakalían family, very close to Ritual Maxakalí. Curt Nimuendaju collected a wordlist of a variety known as Mašakarí/Monačóbm in 1939, which was shown by Araújo (1996) to be an early attestion of Maxakalí.

Spoken Maxakalí is different from the variety used in the Maxakalí ritual songs, Ritual Maxakalí, though both are classified as Maxakalían languages.

== Geographical distribution ==
Maxakalí was originally spoken in the Mucuri River, Itanhém River, and Jequitinhonha River areas. Today, Maxakalí is found in four main communities (aldeias) of Minas Gerais, with a total ethnic population of about 2,000:

- Pradinho (Maxakalí name: Pananiy), in Bertópolis, Minas Gerais
- Água Boa (Maxakalí name: Kõnãg Mai or Akmamo), in Santa Helena de Minas, Minas Gerais
- Aldeia Verde (Maxakalí name: Apne Yĩxux), in Ladainha, Minas Gerais
- Cachoeirinha (Maxakalí name: Ĩmmoknãg), in Teófilo Otoni, Minas Gerais

== History ==
Old Machacari is attested from the 19th century. Related varieties include Monoxó, Makoni, Kapoxó, Kumanaxó, and Panhame. After the dispersion of its speakers in the 1750s, they lived between the upper Mucuri River and São Mateus River (near the present-day city of Teófilo Otoni, Minas Gerais), possibly up to Jequitinhonha in the north to the Suaçuí Grande River, a tributary of the Doce River, in the south. After 1750, the southward migration of the Botocudos forced the Machacari to seek refuge in Portuguese settlements on the Atlantic coast (in an area ranging from the mouth of the Mucuri River to the Itanhaém River), in Alto dos Bois (near Minas Novas), and in Peçanha. According to Saint-Hilaire (2000: 170), the Monoxó lived in Cuyaté (Doce River, near the mouth of the Suaçuí Grande River) probably around 1800, before seeking refuge in Peçanha. At the beginning of the 19th century, the Panhame and other Maxakali groups allied with the Portuguese to fight the Botocudos.

Modern Maxakali (called Monaxobm by Curt Nimuendajú) is distinct from Old Machacari. It was historically spoken from the Mucuri River valley up to the headwaters of the Itanhaém River in Minas Gerais.

== Phonology ==
Maxakalí has ten vowels, including five oral vowels and their nasal counterparts. In the table below, their orthographic representation is given in angle brackets.

=== Vowels ===
	Front	Central	Back
High	i, ĩ ⟨i, ĩ⟩	ɨ, ɨ̃ ⟨u, ũ⟩	u, ũ ⟨o, õ⟩
Low	ɛ, ɛ̃ ⟨e, ẽ⟩	a, ã ⟨a, ã⟩	

Silva (2020) describes two nasal spread processes which affect vowels.

==== Vowel lowering ====
According to Silva (2020), all vowels except /a ã/ have lowered allophones.

The vowels /ɛ ɛ̃ i ĩ ɨ ɨ̃ u ũ/ are lowered to [æ æ̃ ɪ ɪ̃ ɨ ɨ̃ ʊ ʊ̃], respectively, preceding a palatal coda. Examples include tex ~ tehex [ˈt̪æj ~ t̪æˈɦæj] ‘rain’, yẽy [ˈɲæ̃j] ‘to shut up, to be silent’, pix [ˈpɪj] ‘wash (realis)’, mĩy [ˈmɪ̃j] ‘make (realis)’, kux [ˈkɨ̞j] ‘to end; forehead’, mũy [ˈmɨ̞̃j̃] ‘to hold, to grab (irrealis)’, tox [ˈt̪ʊj ~ ˈt̪uwɪ] ‘long’, nõy [ˈn̪ʊ̃j] ‘other; same-sex sibling’.

The vowels /ɨ ɨ̃ u ũ/ are further lowered to [ɘ ɘ̃ o õ], respectively, preceding a velar coda, as in tuk [ˈt̪ɘɰ] ‘to grow up’, yũmũg [ɲɨˈ̃mɘ̃ɰ̃] ‘to know, to understand, to learn’, ponok [puˈd̪oɰ] ‘white’, mõg [ˈmõɰ̃] ‘to go (realis)’. The front vowels /ɛ ɛ̃ i ĩ/ are never followed by a surface velar coda, because underlying velar codas are palatalized to palatal codas in this environment.

In addition, /ɨ̃/ surfaces as [ɘ̃] word-finally, as in yõgnũ [ɲõɰ̃ŋ̞̊ˈn̪ɘ̃ʔ] ‘it is mine’, xõnnũ [ʨũːˈn̪ɘ̃ʔ] ‘son! (vocative)’, nũ [ˈn̪ɘ̃ʔ] ‘this; to come (irrealis).

==== Backing of /a ã/ ====
The vowels /a ã/ are backed to [ɑ ɑ̃] preceding a coronal (dental or palatal) coda. Examples include put(ah)at [pɨˈt̪(ɑɦ)ɑə̯] ‘road’, n(ãh)ãn [ˈn̪(ɑ̃ɦ)ɑ̃ə̯̃] ‘achiote’, hax [ˈhɑj] ‘smell, to smell’, gãx [ˈɡɑ̃j] ‘angry’.

The vowels /a ã/ are backed and rounded in open syllables following a labial onset, as in kopa [kuˈpɒʔ] ‘inside’, hõmã [hũˈmɒ̃ʔ] ‘long ago’.

=== Consonants ===
	Bilabial	Alveolar	Palatal	Velar	Glottal
Voiceless obstruents	p	t̪ ⟨t⟩	tɕ ⟨c⟩	k	(ʔ)
Voiced obstruents or nasals	b ~ m ⟨b⟩	d̪ ~ n̪ ⟨d⟩	dʑ ~ ɲ ⟨ɟ⟩	ɡ	
Fricative					h

The nasals [m n̪ ɲ] have been analyzed as allophones of /b d̪ dʑ/ preceding nasal nuclei, but the contrast between /m n̪ ɲ/ and /b d̪ dʑ/ is emerging in Portuguese borrowings and in diminutives.

In the coda position, only the place of articulation is contrastive, the possibilities being labial (orthographic -p ~ -m), dental (-t ~ -n), palatal (-x ~ -y), and velar (-k ~ -g). The typical realization of the codas involves prevocalization, the consonantal element itself being optional.

==== Absence of fricatives and nasals ====
Maxakalí has been analyzed as having no contrastive fricative or nasal consonants, with the exception of the glottal continuant /h/. The phonological status of the nasal consonants is ambiguous; Silva (2020) argues that in modern Maxakalí they are becoming contrastive through phonologization, even though until recently nasal consonants occurred only as allophones of voiced obstruents.

== Morphology ==
=== Verb ===
==== Tense, aspect and mood ====
Maxakalí verbs inflect for mood. The realis mood is the most common one, whereas the irrealis mood is used in imperative and purpose clauses. The morphological exponence of the mood inflection follows one of at least 7 patterns.

== Syntax ==
=== Word order ===
The most common word order in Maxakalí is SOV.

Kakxop te xok-hep xo’op
child ERG animal-liquid drink
"The child drinks milk"

=== Pronominal forms and morphosyntactic alignment ===
Most clause types in Maxakalí are characterized by the ergative–absolutive morphosyntactic alignment. The agents of transitive verbs are marked by the ergative postposition te, whereas the patients of transitive verbs and the intransitive subjects are unmarked. Absolutive pronominal participants are expressed by person prefixes; ergative pronominal participants take special forms upon receiving the ergative postposition te. The same forms are found with other postpositions; furthermore, ã and xa occur as the irregular inflected forms of the dative postposition pu in the first person singular and in the second person, respectively.

Person	Postpositional	Dative	Ergative	Absolutive
1SG	ã	ã	ã te	ũg
2	xa	xa	xa te	ã
3	tu	tu	tu te	ũ
1INCL	yũmũ’ã	yũmũ’ã	yũmũ’ã te	yũmũg
1EXCL	ũgmũ’ã	ũgmũ’ã	ũgmũ’ã te	ũgmũg

ũgmũg mõ-g nãpet ha nũy xa hãpxop ũm pop
1PL.EXCL.ABS go-REAL market to in-order-to 2sg:DAT food some buy
"We (excluding you) are going to the market to buy you (indirect object) some food."

== Lexicon ==
=== Verbal number ===
Some verbs form number pairs, whereby the choice of the verb depends on the number of the absolutive participant (i.e., the subject of an intransitive verb or the patient of a transitive verb). The noun phrase which encodes the participant does not receive any overt marking.

Subject number

Tik yũm.
/tik ɟɨ̃p/
man sit.SG.REAL
‘The man sits/sat.’

Tik mãm.
/tik bãp/
man sit.PL.REAL
‘The men sit/sat.’

Patient number

Tik te koktix putex.
/tik te kuktik ptek/
man ERG monkey kill.SG.REAL
‘The man killed the monkey.’

Tik te koktix kix.
/tik te kuktik ki-k/
man ERG monkey kill.PL-REAL

=== Noun compounding ===
Maxakalí nouns readily form compounds, here are some examples:

yĩy-kox-xax
speak-hole-cover
‘lips’

ãmot-xuxpex
sand-tasty
‘salt’

yĩm-kutok
hand-child
‘finger’

=== Loanwords ===
Maxakalí has a number of lexical loans from one of the Língua Geral varieties, such as ãmãnex ‘priest’, tãyũmak ‘money’, kãmãnok ‘horse’, tapayõg ‘Black man’.

Loanwords from Brazilian Portuguese are extremely numerous. Examples include kapex ‘coffee’, komenok ‘blanket’, kapitõg ‘captain’, pẽyõg ‘beans’, mug ‘bank’, tenemiyam ‘TV’ (borrowed from Portuguese café, cobertor, capitão, feijão, banco, televisão).

== See also ==
- Ritual Maxakalí language
- Maxakalí Sign Language
