= Ritual Maxakalí language =

Ritual language of Brazil

Ritual Maxakalí
- Old Maxakalí
- Native to: Brazil
- Ethnicity: Maxakali
- Native speakers: None
- Language family: Macro-Jê: Maxakalían; Maxakalí group; Ritual Maxakalí

Language codes
- ISO 639-3: None (mis)
- Glottolog: None

Ritual Maxakalí (also referred to as "Old Maxakalí") is a ritual language belonging to the Maxakalían language family of eastern Brazil. It is used in ritual songs sung by the Maxakali, and is held to be the language of their ancestors. Spoken Maxakalí is different from the variety used in the Maxakalí ritual songs, though both are classified as Maxakalían languages. It is more closely related to other extinct Maxakalían languages such as Makoní than to modern spoken Maxakalí. It is also closely related to Monoxó, Kapoxó, Kumanaxó, Panhame, and other extinct varieties.
