= Baenã language =

Extinct unclassified language of Brazil

Baenã
- Baenan
- Native to: Brazil
- Region: Bahia
- Ethnicity: Baênã
- Extinct: by 1961
- Language family: unclassified

Language codes
- ISO 639-3: None (mis)
- Glottolog: baen1237

Baenã (Baenan, Baenán, Baena, Baênã) is a poorly attested, extinct, and unclassified language of Brazil. Only nine words have been attributed to the language.

== History ==
In 1927, when the Paraguaçu Indigenous Post was founded, the small tribe called the Baenã by the Pataxó and Nocnoács by Serviço de Proteção ao Índio (SPI) officer Alberto Jacobina, resided above the reserve. They had been ignored entirely by ethologists until that point. The German-Brazilian anthropologist Curt Nimuendajú claimed he had no clue of their origins. The Baenã were forcibly moved to the post, where all of them died soon after, except for a six-year-old boy who had been "caught" as a baby and did not learn the Baenã language as of 1938. About ten Baenã were still living outside the reserve, located on the headwaters of the Ribeirão Vermelho, a tributary of the Pardo River, at the same time. Nimuendajú described their culture as being very similar to that of the Pataxó, though they were distinguished by their languages and appearance. The last remaining speaker of Baenã lived in the state of Bahia, Brazil, in 1940. The language of this speaker was associated with the Baenã language as the last members of the Baenã tribe lived in Paraguaçú, Bahia, near where the language was attested. By 1961, only one Baenã person was found, Rosalinda, who was married to Pataxó-Hãhãhãe language consultant Titiá; she could not provide any words of the language. Čestmír Loukotka claimed that only "a few individuals" could speak Baenã in 1964. Today, the Baenã are integrated as one of the five primary subgroups of the Pataxó-Hã-Hã-Hãe people.

== Geographical distribution ==
Loukotka claimed that Baenã was originally spoken between the Cachoeira and Pardo Rivers, but was distributed on the Paraguaçu Indigenous Post in 1964.

== Vocabulary ==
There are nine words which may be attributed to Baenã. They were recorded by Nimuendajú in 1938 and included in his manuscripts on the Kamakã language. However, the SPI inspector in Recife, R. D. Carneiro, suspected that they actually belonged to the language spoken by the Baenã. The words were subsequently published by Loukotka in 1963.

Baenã words
gloss	Baenã
deer	eželẽ
venison	bakurí
fire	kelemés
jaguar	patarak
black person	kadašužé
pig	bonikro
rat	pititiɲga
monkey	pitirát
bull	šẽšẽ
