= Pataxó-Hãhãhãe language =

Language in Brazil

Pataxó-Hãhãhãe
- Hahaháy, Northern Pataxó, Hãhãhãe
- Native to: Brazil
- Region: Minas Gerais, Bahia
- Ethnicity: Pataxó-Hãhãhãe
- Extinct: 1920s fully in 1992, with the death of Bahetá
- Revival: 1999
- Language family: Macro-Jê: Maxakalían; Maxakalí group; Pataxó–Pataxó-Hãhãhãe; Pataxó-Hãhãhãe

Language codes
- ISO 639-3: pth
- Glottolog: pata1261

Pataxó-Hãhãhãe (Northern Pataxó, Hãhãhãe) is an extinct Maxakalían language formerly spoken in Brazil. It is distinct from the Pataxó language.

== Geographical distribution ==
Pataxó as documented by Prince Maximilian of Wied-Neuwied during the early 1800s is distinct from, though closely related to, Pataxó-Hãhãhãe. It was historically spoken from the Mucuri River to Porto Seguro in southern Bahia from at least the 17th century.

From at least the 19th century, the Pataxó-Hãhãhãe had historically occupied a region stretching from the Pardo River to the de Contas River in southern Bahia.

== History ==
In 1961, a Pataxó rememberer named Tšitši'a (Txitxiáh) was recorded by Wilbur Pickering in Posto Caramurú (located 3 kilometers from Itaju, Bahia). Tšitši'a was married to a Baenã woman, but she could not speak the Baenã language. Pataxó people were also reported to be living in Itagüira, Itabuna, Bahia. The last known rememberer of Hãhãhãe in the Paraguaçu outpost, Bahetá, created lessons on the Pataxó language.

A 100-word primer of Pataxó exists, which is of symbolic value to the community.

== Phonology ==
=== Vowels ===
The following table lists Pataxó-Hãhãhãe vowel phonemes.

| | Front | | Central | | Back | |
| | oral | nasal | oral | nasal | oral | nasal |
|---|---|---|---|---|---|---|
| Close | i | ĩ | ɨ | ɨ̃ | u | ũ |
| Close-mid | e | ẽ | ə | ə̃ | o | õ |
| Open-mid | ɛ | ɛ̃ | ʌ | ʌ̃ | ɔ | ɔ̃ |
| Open | | | a | ã | | |

- /ʌ/ is an unrounded back vowel.

=== Consonants ===
The following table lists Pataxó-Hãhãhãe consonant phonemes.

| | | Labial | Alveolar | Palatal | Velar | Glottal |
|---|---|---|---|---|---|---|
| Nasal | | m | n | ɲ | ŋ | |
| Plosive/ Affricate | voiceless | p | t | tʃ | k | ʔ |
| Plosive/ Affricate | voiced | b | | | g | |
| Fricative | voiceless | | | ʃ | | h |
| Fricative | voiced | | | ʒ | | |
| Approximant | | | | | w | |

== Bibliography ==
- Meader, Robert E. (1978). Indios do Nordeste: Levantamento sobre os remanescentes tribais do nordeste brasileiro (in Portuguese). Brasilia: SIL International. Archived from the original on 2024-10-08.
- Nelson, Jessica Fae (2017). Dicionário Pataxó Hãhãhãe.
- Nelson, Jessica Fae (2018). Pataxó Hãhãhãe: Race, Indigeneity and Language Revitalization in the Brazilian Northeast (PDF). University of Arizona.
- Nelson, Jessica Fae (2021). "Retaking Hãhãhãe: Revitalization and Reindigenization in a Context of Indigenous Erasure". In Avineri, Netta; Harasta, Jesse (eds.). Metalinguistic Communities. Cham: Springer International Publishing. pp. 161–179. doi:10.1007/978-3-030-76900-0_8. ISBN 978-3-030-76899-7.
- Nelson, Jessica Fae (2023-10-01). "On Pataxó Hãhãhãe and Maxakalí". International Journal of American Linguistics. 89 (4): 531–563. doi:10.1086/726150. ISSN 0020-7071.
- Ramirez, Henri; Vegini, Valdir; França, Maria Cristina Victorino de (2015-09-26). "Koropó, puri, kamakã e outras línguas do Leste Brasileiro". LIAMES: Línguas Indígenas Americanas (in Portuguese). 15 (2): 223–277. doi:10.20396/liames.v15i2.8642302. ISSN 2177-7160.
- Santos, Reginaldo Ramos dos (2020-12-29). "Kuin Kahab Mikahab: Hãhãhãe Pataxó Hãhãhãe Ũg Iẽ Ikhã Ikô Tâypâk Anekö: Quero comer, quero viver: a luta pelo reavivamento da língua Pataxó Hãhãhãe". Cadernos de Linguística. 1 (3): 01–14. doi:10.25189/2675-4916.2020.v1.n3.id253.
- Wied, Maximilian Alexander Philipp, Prinz von (1989). Viagem ao Brasil nos anos de 1815 a 1817. Belo Horizonte: Editora Itatiaia.
- "Lições de Bahetá: Sobre a Língua Pataxó Hãhãhãi". Comissão Pró-Índio de São Paulo (in Brazilian Portuguese).
- "Pataxó Hã-Hã-Hãe - Indigenous Peoples in Brazil". pib.socioambiental.org.
