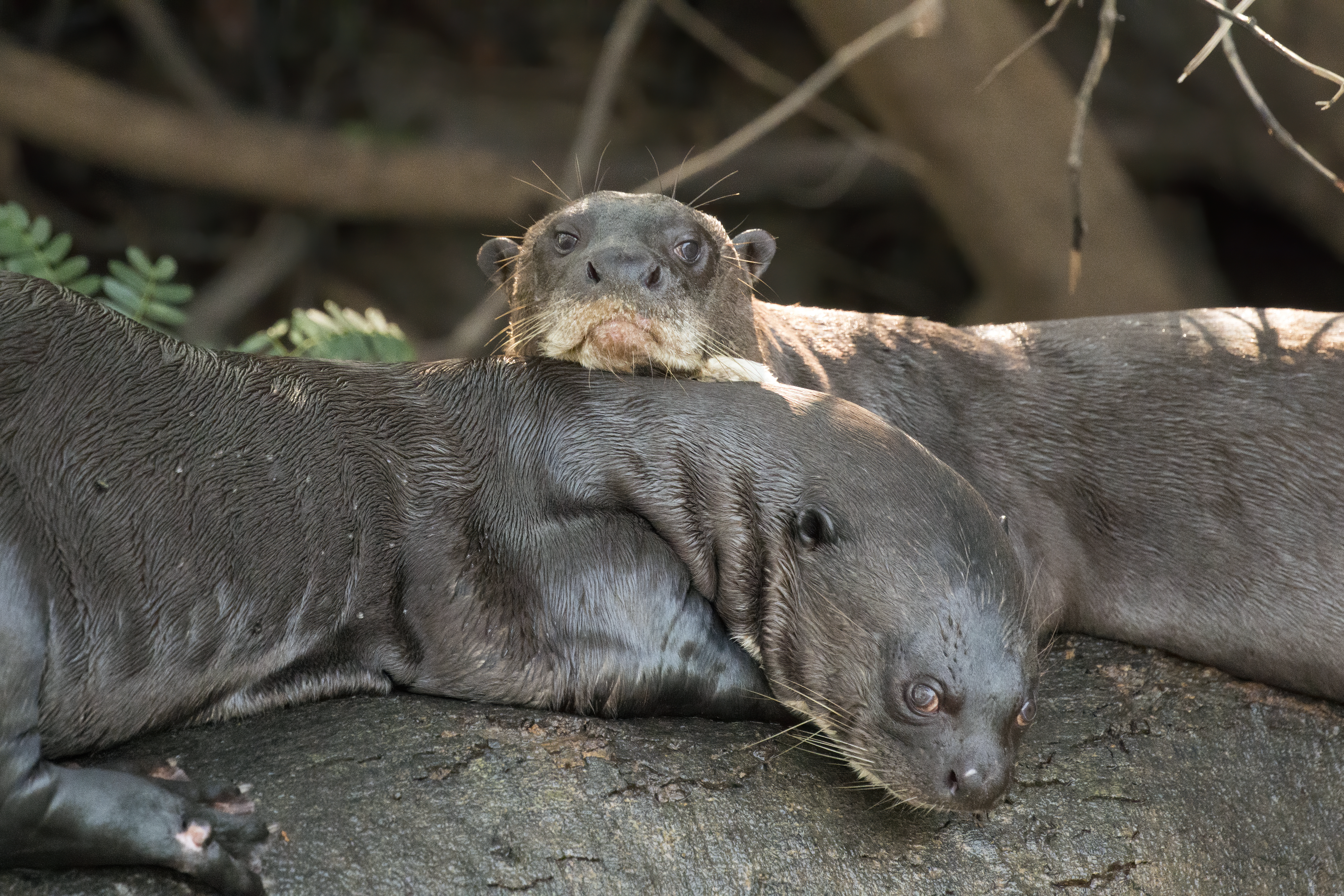
- Cuiabá River, Mato Grosso do Sul, Brazil

Conservation status
- Endangered (IUCN 3.1)
- CITES Appendix I

Scientific classification
- Kingdom: Animalia
- Phylum: Chordata
- Class: Mammalia
- Order: Carnivora
- Family: Mustelidae
- Subfamily: Lutrinae
- Genus: Pteronura; Gray, 1837
- Species: P. brasiliensis

Binomial name
- Pteronura brasiliensis (Gmelin, 1788)
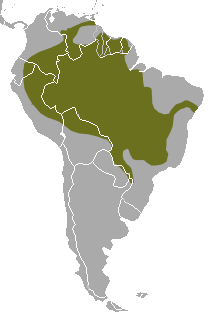
- Giant otter range

= Giant otter =

Giant otter Temporal range: 0.13–0 Ma Late Pleistocene – Holocene

Species of mammal

The giant otter or giant river otter (Pteronura brasiliensis) is a South American carnivorous mammal. It is the longest member of the weasel family, Mustelidae, reaching up to 1.8 m (5 ft 11 in). Atypical of mustelids, the giant otter is a social species, with family groups typically supporting three to eight members. The groups are centered on a dominant breeding pair and are extremely cohesive and cooperative. Although generally peaceful, the species is territorial and aggression has been observed between groups. The giant otter is diurnal, being active exclusively during daylight hours. It is the noisiest otter species and distinct vocalizations have been documented that indicate alarm, aggression and reassurance.

The giant otter ranges across north-central South America; it lives mostly in and along the Amazon River and in the Pantanal. Its distribution has been greatly reduced and is now discontinuous. Decades of poaching for its velvety pelt, peaking in the 1950s and 1960s, considerably diminished population numbers. The species was listed as endangered in 1999 and wild population estimates are typically below 5,000. The Guianas are one of the last real strongholds for the species, which also enjoys modest numbers – and significant protection – in the Peruvian Amazonian basin. It is one of the most endangered mammal species in the Neotropics. Habitat degradation and loss is the greatest current threat. They are also rare in captivity; in 2003, only 60 giant otters were being held.

The giant otter shows a variety of adaptations suitable to an amphibious lifestyle, including exceptionally dense fur, a wing-like tail, and webbed feet. The species prefers freshwater rivers and streams, which are usually seasonally flooded, and may also take to freshwater lakes and springs. It constructs extensive campsites close to feeding areas, clearing large amounts of vegetation. The giant otter subsists almost exclusively on a diet of fish, particularly characins and catfish, but may also eat crabs, turtles, snakes and small caimans. It has no serious natural predators other than humans, although it must compete with other predators, such as the Neotropical otters and various crocodilian species, for food resources.

== Name ==
The giant otter has a handful of other names. In Brazil it is known as ariranha, from the Tupi word arerãîa, or onça-d'água, meaning water jaguar. In Spanish, river wolf (Spanish: lobo de río) and water dog (Spanish: perro de agua) are used occasionally (though the latter also refers to several different animals) and may have been more common in the reports of explorers in the 19th and early 20th centuries. All four names are in use in South America, with a number of regional variations. "Giant otter" translates literally as nutria gigante and lontra-gigante in Spanish and Portuguese, respectively. Among the Achuar people, they are known as wankanim, among the Sanumá as hadami, and among the Makushi as turara. The genus name, Pteronura, is derived from the Ancient Greek words πτερόν (pteron, feather or wing) and οὐρά (oura, tail), a reference to its distinctive, wing-like tail.

== Taxonomy and evolution ==
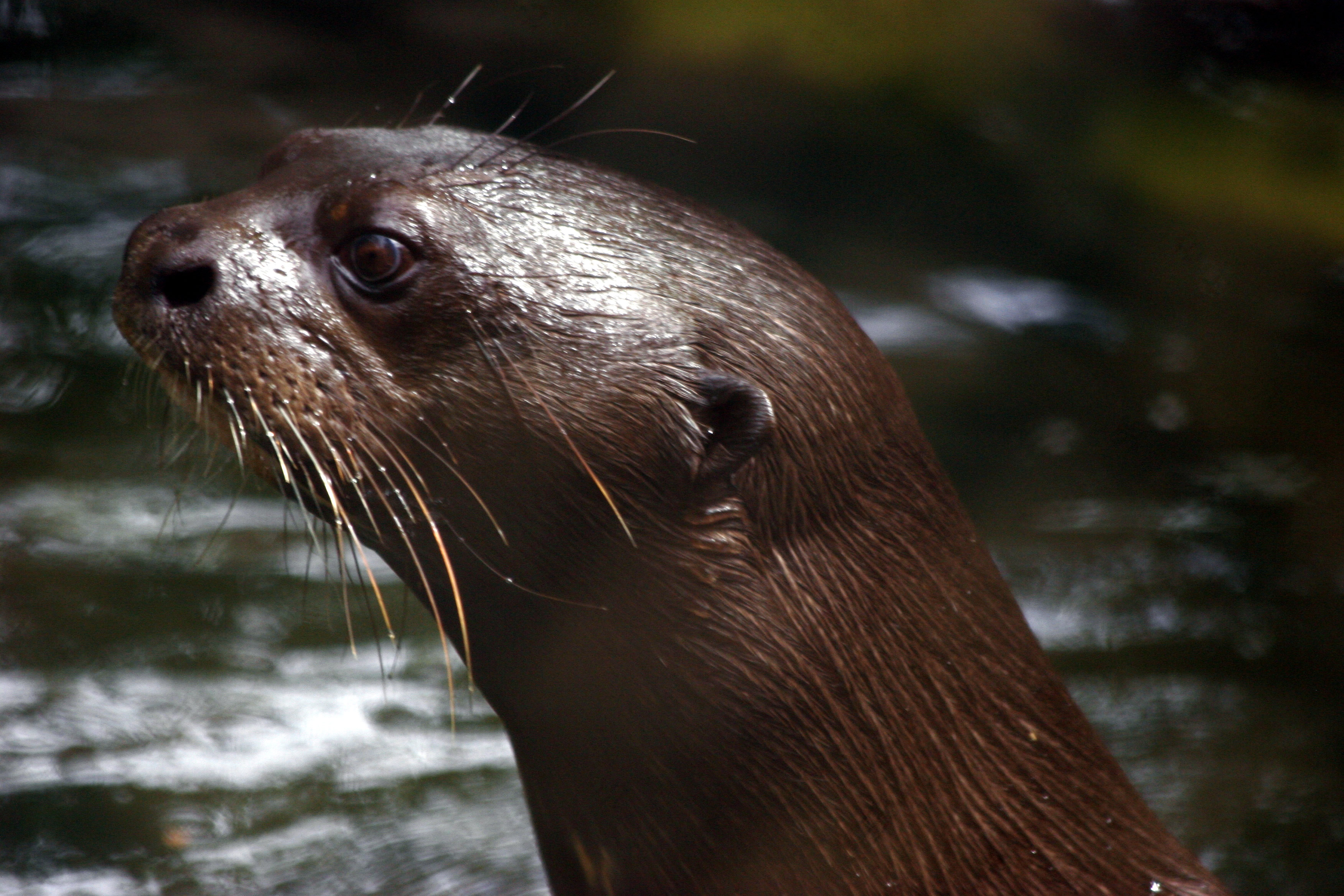
Giant otter head from the Museu Paraense Emílio Goeldi research institute

The otters form the subfamily Lutrinae within the mustelids and the giant otter is the only member of the genus Pteronura. Two subspecies are currently recognized by the canonical Mammal Species of the World, P. b. brasiliensis and P. b. paraguensis. Incorrect descriptions of the species have led to multiple synonyms (the latter subspecies is often P. b. paranensis in the literature). P. b. brasiliensis is distributed across the north of the giant otter range, including the Orinoco, Amazon, and Guianas river systems; to the south, P. b. paraguensis has been suggested in Paraguay, Uruguay, southern Brazil, and northern Argentina, although it may be extinct in the last three of these four. The International Union for Conservation of Nature (IUCN) considers the species' presence in Argentina and Uruguay uncertain. In the former, investigation has shown thinly distributed population remnants. P. b. paraguensis is supposedly smaller and more gregarious, with different dentition and skull morphology. Carter and Rosas, however, rejected the subspecific division in 1997, noting the classification had only been validated once, in 1968, and the P. b. paraguensis type specimen was very similar to P. b. brasiliensis. Biologist Nicole Duplaix calls the division of "doubtful value".

The earliest fossil evidence of the giant river otter dates to the Late Pleistocene of Argentina, and it was slightly larger than known modern specimens. An extinct genus, Satherium, is believed to be ancestral to the present species, having migrated to the New World during the Pliocene or early Pleistocene. The giant otter shares the South American continent with three of the four members of the New World otter genus Lontra: the Neotropical river otter, the southern river otter, and the marine otter. (The North American river otter (Lontra canadensis) is the fourth Lontra member.) The giant otter seems to have evolved independently of Lontra in South America, despite the overlap. The smooth-coated otter (Lutrogale perspicillata) of Asia may be its closest extant relative; similar behaviour, vocalizations, and skull morphology have been noted. Both species also show strong pair bonding and paternal engagement in rearing cubs. Giant otter fossil remains have been recovered from a cave in the Brazilian Mato Grosso.

Phylogenetic analysis by Koepfli and Wayne in 1998 found the giant otter has the highest divergence sequences within the otter subfamily, forming a distinct clade that split away 10 to 14 million years ago. They noted that the species may be the basal divergence among the otters or fall outside of them altogether, having split even before other mustelids, such as the ermine, polecat, and mink. Later gene sequencing research on the mustelids, from 2004, places the divergence of the giant otter somewhat later, between five and 11 million years ago; the corresponding phylogenetic tree locates the Lontra divergence first among otter genera, and Pteronura second, although divergence ranges overlap.

== Physical characteristics ==
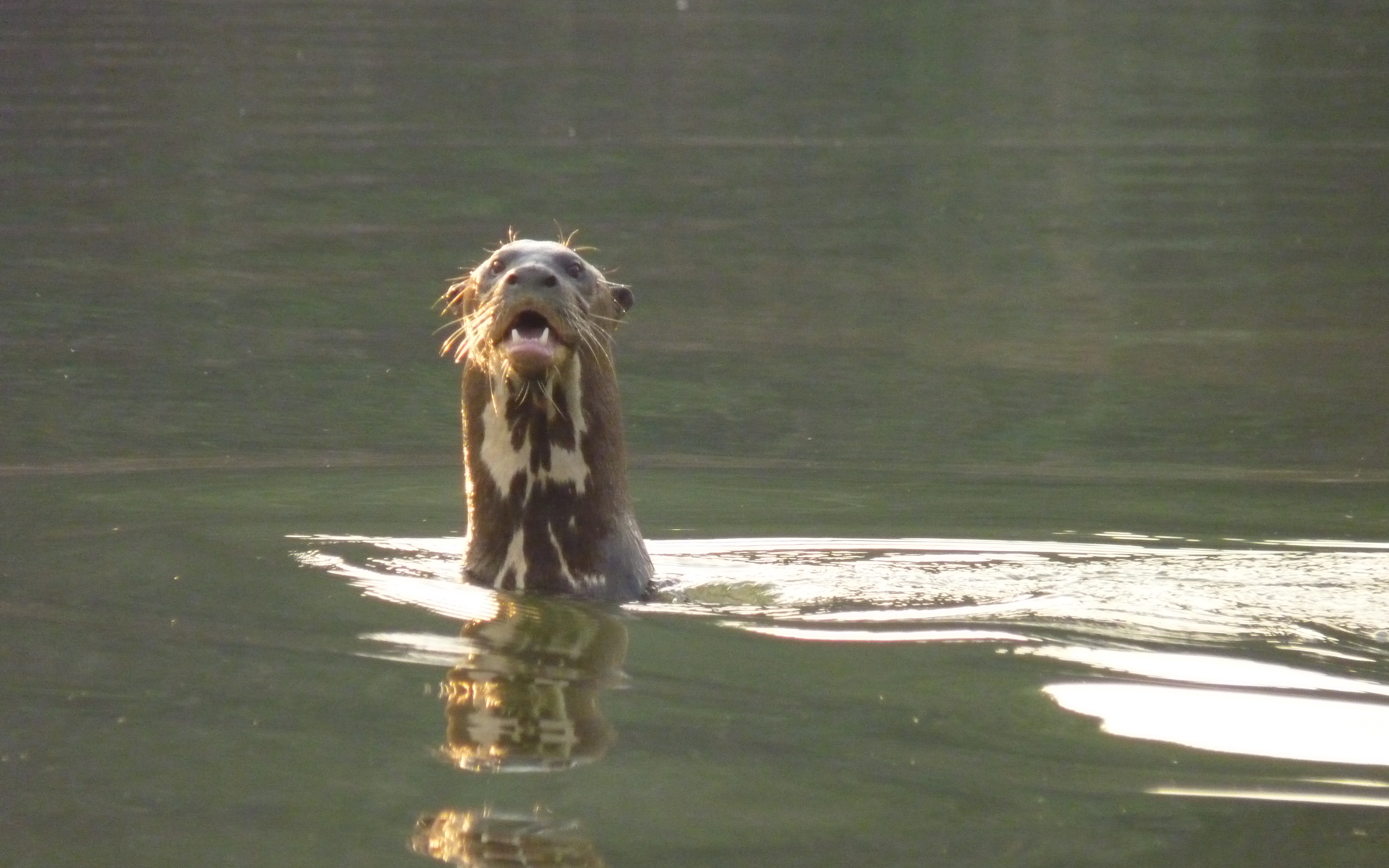
A wild giant otter "periscoping" in Cantão State Park in Brazil, showing its identifying throat marks

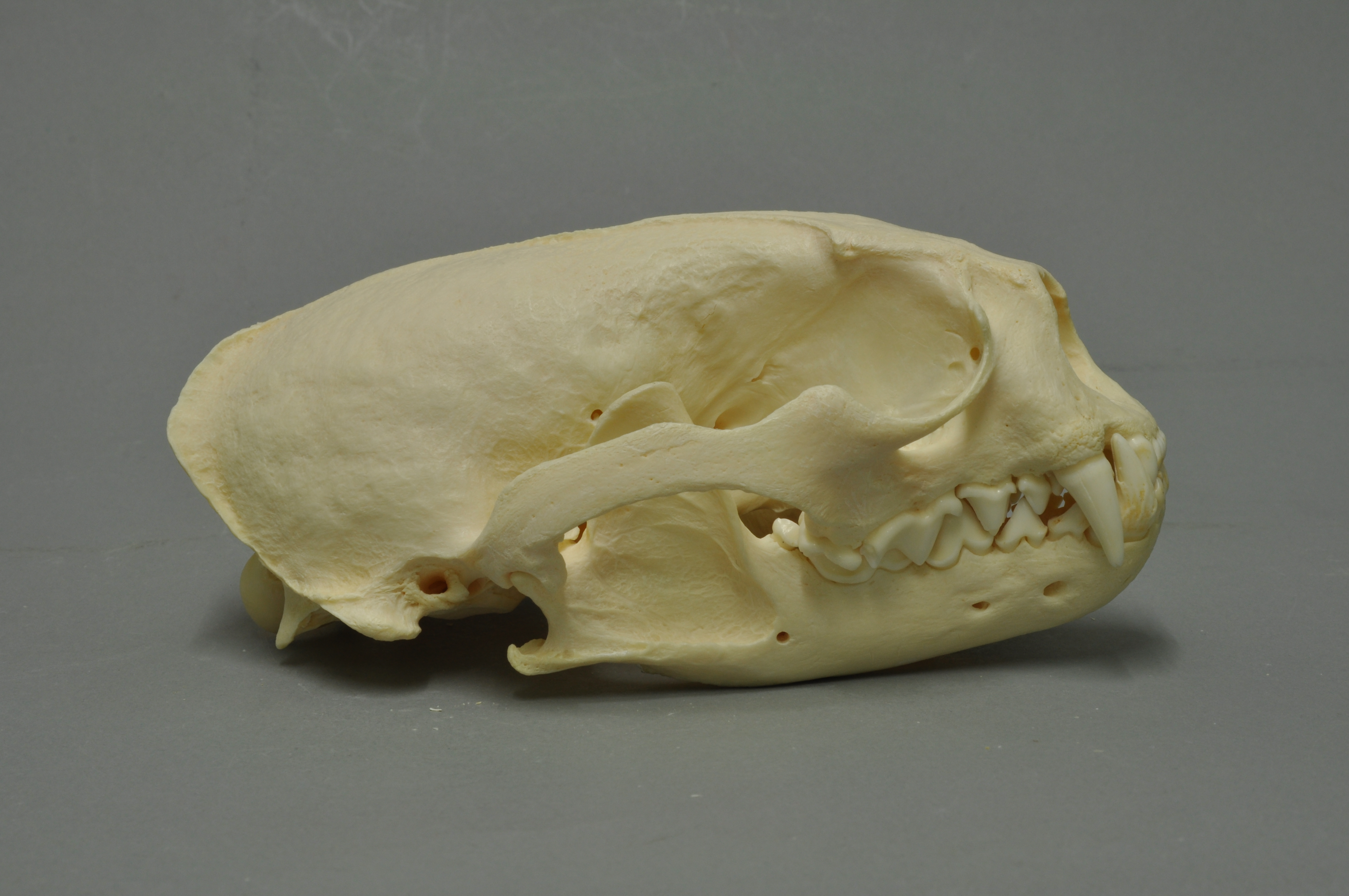
Skull seen from the side. Short-snouted as usual in mustelids, it has a pronounced sagittal crest, allowing for a very powerful bite in this species.

The giant otter is clearly distinguished from other otters by morphological and behavioural characteristics. It has the greatest body length of any species in the mustelid family, although the sea otter may be heavier. Males are between 1.5 and 1.7 m (4 ft 11 in and 5 ft 7 in) in length from head to tail and females between 1 and 1.5 m (3 ft 3 1/2 in and 4 ft 11 in). The animal's well-muscled tail can add a further 70 cm (28 in) to the total body length. Early reports of skins and living animals suggested exceptionally large males of up to 2.4 m (7 ft 10 1/2 in); intensive hunting likely reduced the occurrence of such massive specimens. Weights are between 26 and 32 kg (57 and 71 lb) for males and 22 and 26 kg (49 and 57 lb) for females. The giant otter has the shortest fur of all otter species; it is typically chocolate brown, but may be reddish or fawn, and appears nearly black when wet. The fur is extremely dense, so much so that water cannot penetrate to the skin. Guard hairs trap water and keep the inner fur dry; the guard hairs are approximately 8 millimeters (5/16 of an inch) in length, about twice as long as the fur of the inner coat. Its velvety feel makes the animal highly sought after by fur traders and has contributed to its decline. Individuals can be identified from birth by unique markings of white or cream fur on the throat and under the chin.

Giant otter muzzles are short and sloping and give the head a ball-shaped appearance. The ears are small and rounded. The nose (or rhinarium) is completely covered in fur, with only the two slit-like nostrils visible. The giant otter's highly sensitive whiskers (vibrissae) allow the animal to track changes in water pressure and currents, which aids in detecting prey. The legs are short and stubby and end in large webbed feet tipped with sharp claws. Well suited for an aquatic life, it can close its ears and nose while underwater.

At the time of Carter and Rosas's writing, vision had not been directly studied, but field observations show the animal primarily hunts by sight; above water, it is able to recognize observers at great distances. The fact that it is exclusively active during the day further suggests its eyesight should be strong, to aid in hunting and predator avoidance. In other otter species, vision is generally normal or slightly myopic, both on land and in water. The giant otter's hearing is acute and its sense of smell is excellent.

The species possesses 2n = 38 chromosomes.

== Biology and behaviour ==
The giant otter is large, gregarious, and diurnal. Early travelers' reports describe noisy groups surrounding explorers' boats, but little scientific information was available on the species until Duplaix's groundbreaking work in the late 1970s. Concern over this endangered species has since generated a body of research.

=== Vocalizations ===
The giant otter is an especially noisy animal, with a complex repertoire of vocalizations. All otters produce vocalizations, but by frequency and volume, the giant otter may be the most vocal. Duplaix identified nine distinct sounds, with further subdivisions possible, depending on context. Quick hah barks or explosive snorts suggest immediate interest and possible danger. A wavering scream may be used in bluff charges against intruders, while a low growl is used for aggressive warning. Hums and coos are more reassuring within the group. Whistles may be used as advance warning of nonhostile intent between groups, although evidence is limited. Newborn pups squeak to elicit attention, while older young whine and wail when they begin to participate in group activities. An analysis published in 2014 cataloged 22 distinct types of vocalization in adults and 11 in neonates. Each family of otters was shown to have its own unique audio signature.

=== Social structure ===
The giant otter is a highly social animal and lives in extended family groups. Group sizes are anywhere from two to 20 members but likely average between three and eight, and larger figures may reflect two or three family groups temporarily feeding together.

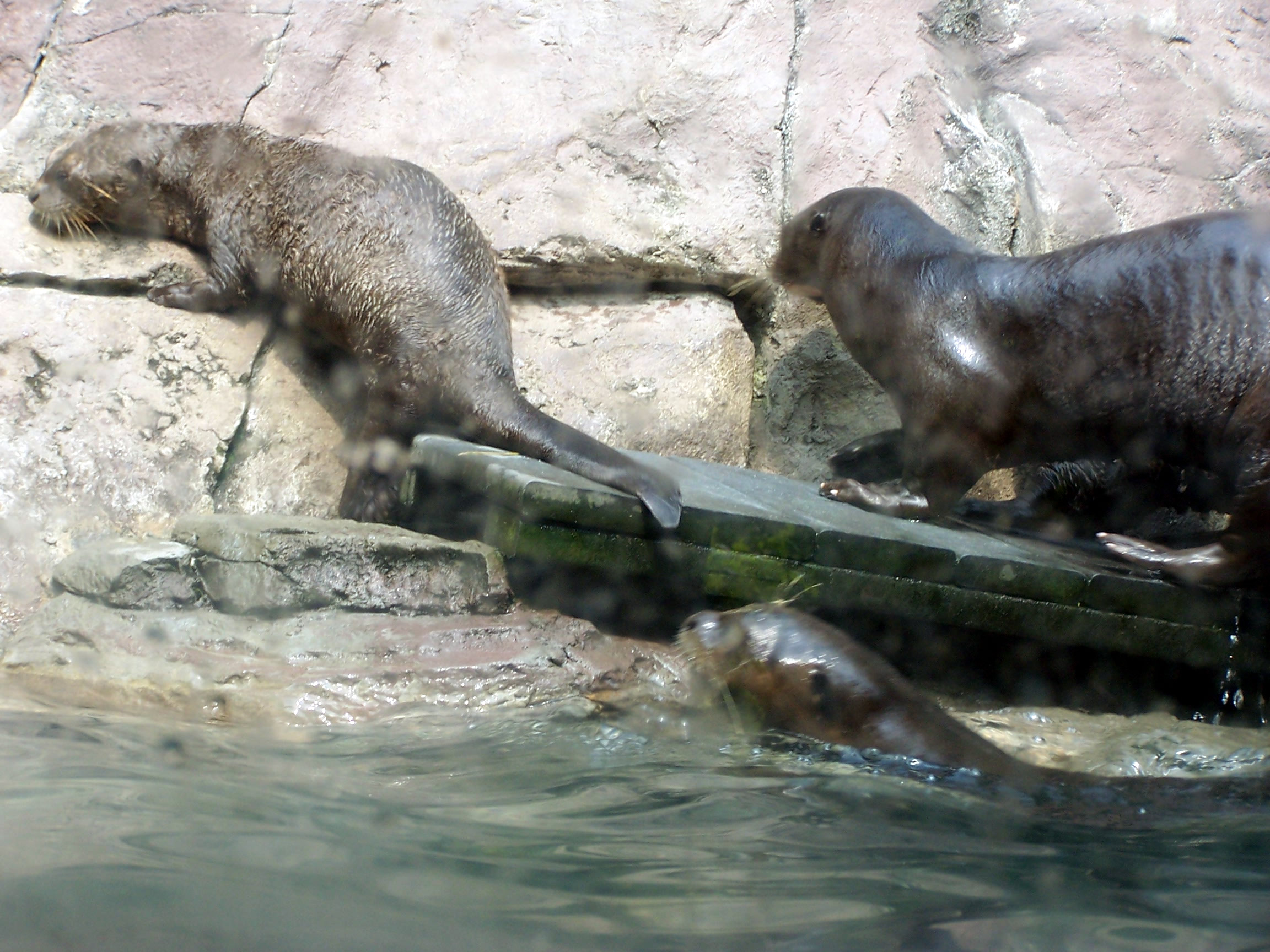
Giant otters leave a pool together at the Philadelphia Zoo. The species is extremely social, a rarity among mustelids, and family groups are cohesive.

Group members share roles, structured around the dominant breeding pair. The species is territorial, with groups marking their ranges with latrines, gland secretions, and vocalizations. At least one case of a change in alpha relationship has been reported, with a new male taking over the role; the mechanics of the transition were not determined. Duplaix suggests a division between "residents", who are established within groups and territories, and nomadic and solitary "transients"; the categories do not seem rigid, and both may be a normal part of the giant otter life cycle. One tentative theory for the development of sociality in mustelids is that locally abundant but unpredictably dispersed prey causes groups to form.

Aggression within the species ("intraspecific" conflict) has been documented. Defence against intruding animals appears to be cooperative: while adult males typically lead in aggressive encounters, cases of alpha females guarding groups have been reported. One fight was directly observed in the Brazilian Pantanal in which three animals violently engaged a single individual near a range boundary. In another instance in Brazil, a carcass was found with clear indications of violent assault by other otters, including bites to the snout and genitals, an attack pattern similar to that exhibited by captive animals. While not rare among large predators in general, intraspecific aggression is uncommon among otter species; Ribas and Mourão suggest a correlation to the animal's sociability, which is also rare among other otters. A capacity for aggressive behavior should not be overstated with the giant otter. Researchers emphasize that even between groups, conflict avoidance is generally adopted. Within groups, the animals are extremely peaceful and cooperative. Group hierarchies are not rigid and the animals easily share roles.

=== Reproduction and life cycle ===
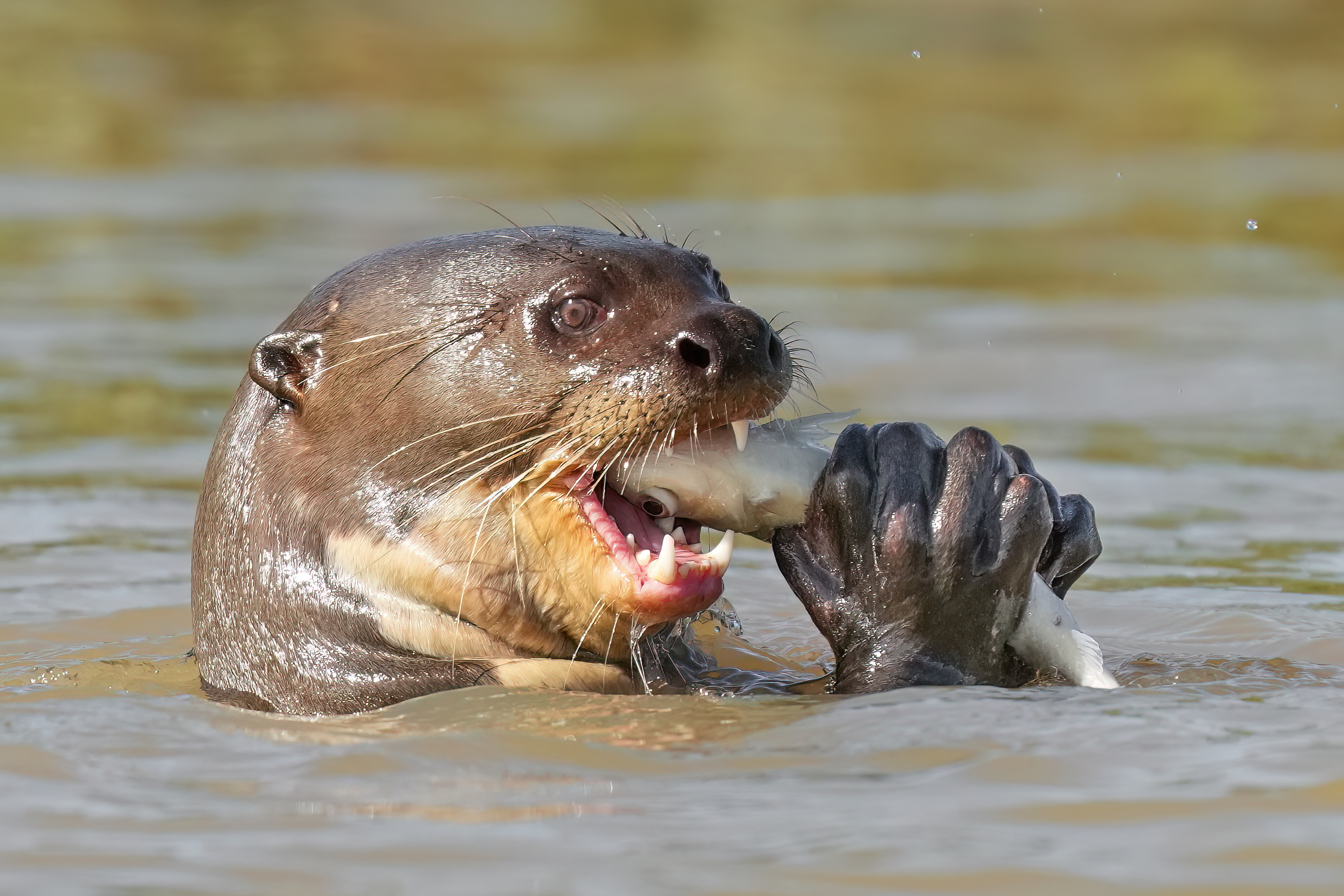
Giant otter eating a fish caught from the river in the Pantanal, Brazil

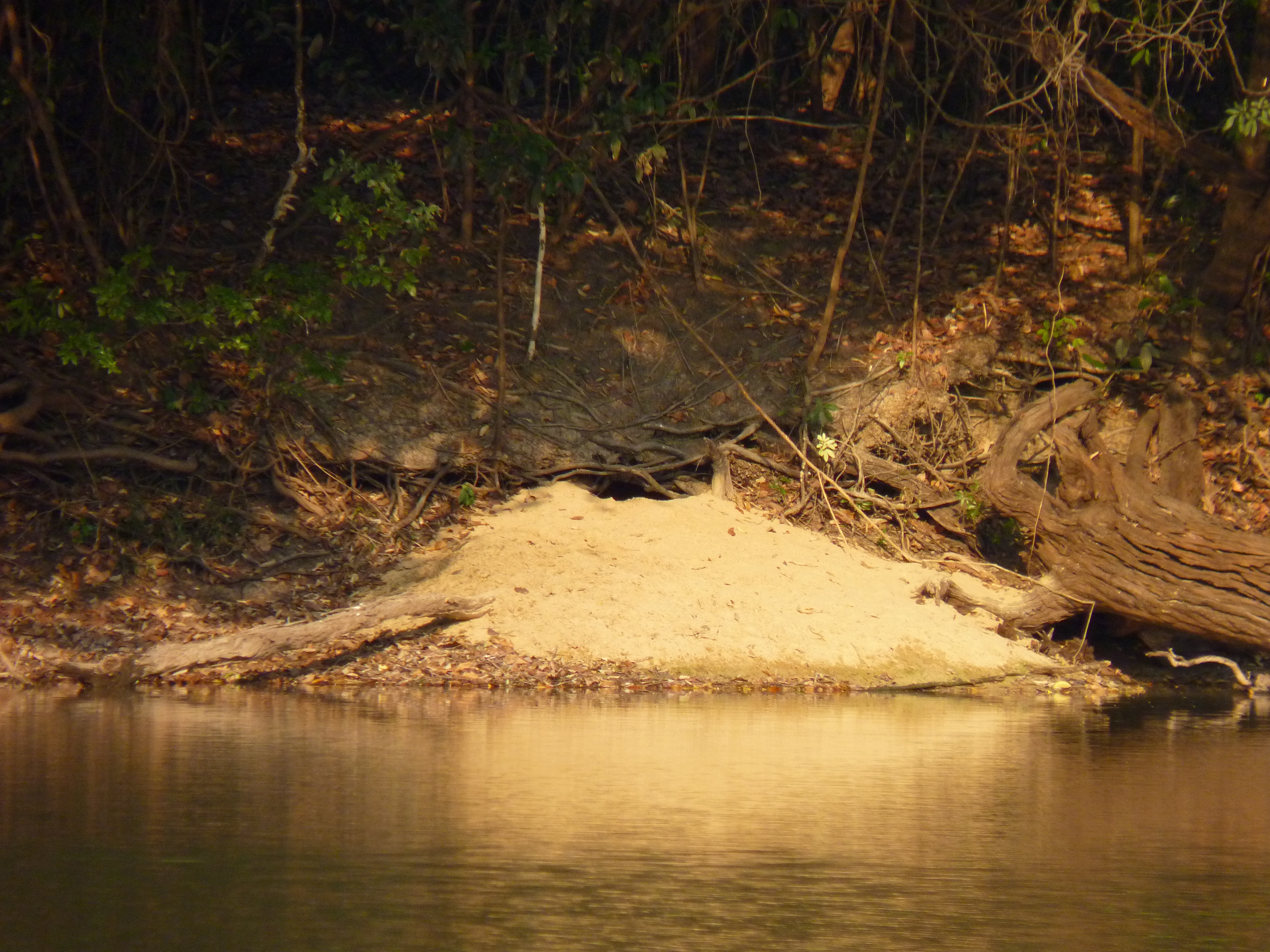
A giant otter den dug on a lakeshore at Cantão State Park – the newly dug white sand is a sign of recent activity at this den.

Giant otters build dens, which are holes dug into riverbanks, usually with multiple entrances and multiple chambers inside. They give birth within these dens during the dry season. In Cantão State Park, otters dig their reproductive dens on the shores of oxbow lakes starting around July, when waters are already quite low. They give birth between August and September, and the young pups emerge for the first time in October and November, which are the months of lowest water when fish concentrations in the dwindling lakes and channels are at their peak. This makes it easier for the adults to catch enough fish for the growing young, and for the pups to learn how to catch fish. The entire group, including nonreproductive adults, which are usually older siblings to that year's pups, collaborates to catch enough fish for the young.

Details of giant otter reproduction and life cycle are scarce, and captive animals have provided much of the information. Females appear to give birth year round, although in the wild, births may peak during the dry season. The estrous cycle is 21 days, with females receptive to sexual advances between three and 10 days. Study of captive specimens has found only males initiate copulation. At Tierpark Hagenbeck in Germany, long-term pair bonding and individualized mate selection were seen, with copulation most frequently taking place in water. Females have a gestation period of 65 to 70 days, giving birth to one to five pups, with an average of two. Research over five years on a breeding pair at the Cali Zoo in Colombia found the average interval between litters was six to seven months, but as short as 77 days when the previous litter did not survive. Other sources have found greater intervals, with as long as 21 to 33 months suggested for otters in the wild.

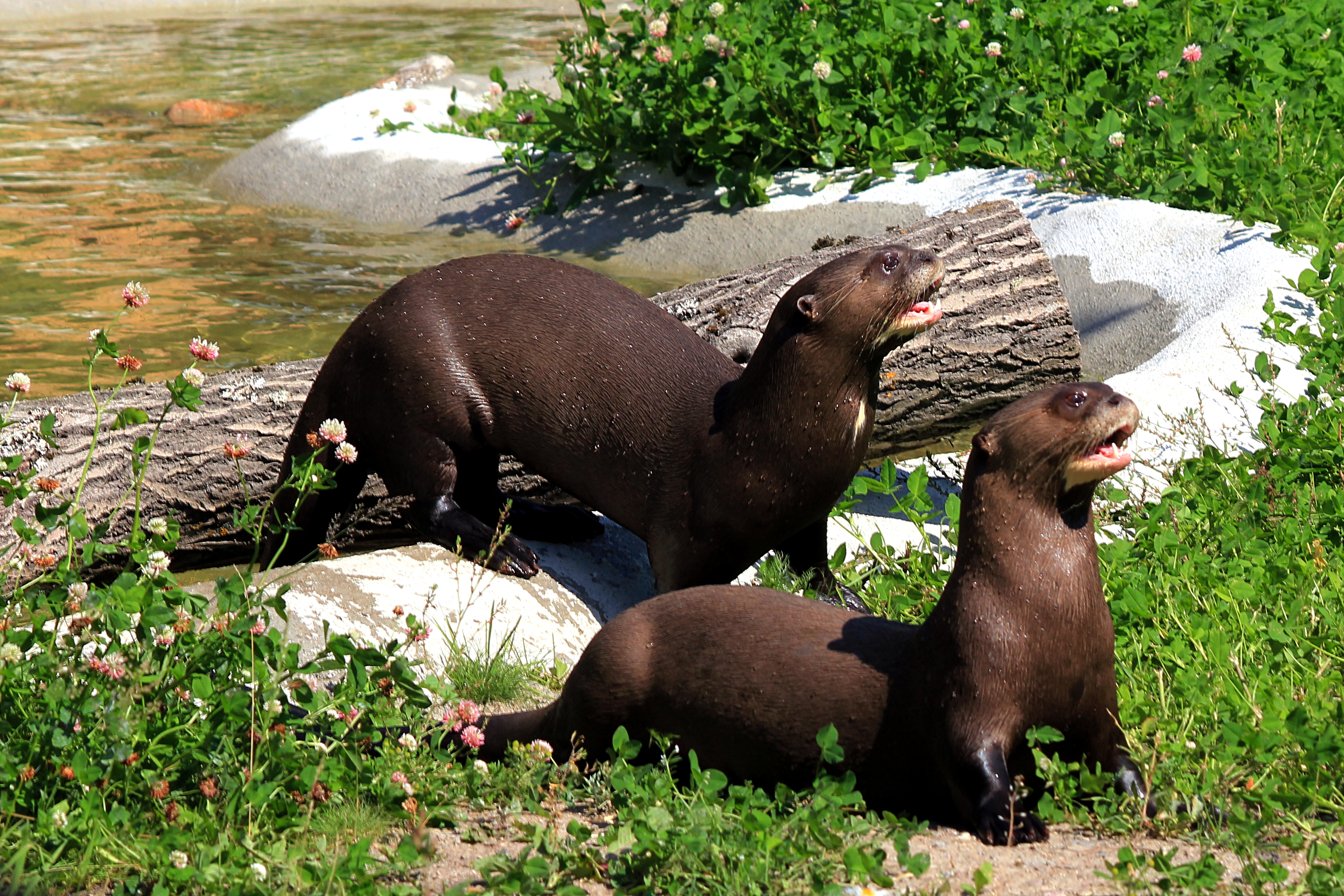
Captive giant otters have contributed greatly to scientific knowledge of the species by providing readily available subjects for research on the species' reproduction and life cycle.

Mothers give birth to furred and blind cubs in an underground den near the river shore and fishing sites. Males actively participate in rearing cubs and family cohesion is strong; older, juvenile siblings also participate in rearing, although in the weeks immediately after birth, they may temporarily leave the group. Pups open their eyes in their fourth week, begin walking in their fifth, and are able to swim confidently between 12 and 14 weeks old. They are weaned by nine months and begin hunting successfully soon after. The animal reaches sexual maturity at about two years of age and both male and female pups leave the group permanently after two to three years. They then search for new territory to begin a family of their own.

Studies of giant otters in captivity have given indications about the environment necessary to both maintain a physically and behaviorally healthy population and allow successful cub-rearing. These include providing at least the minimum recommended land-to-water area ratio, and that all enclosure land surfaces (both artificial and natural) are nearly entirely covered with the recommended substrate conditions (e.g. tree-bark mulch and soft pebble-free sand/soil). Ensuring that the animals have sufficient privacy from human disturbances (visual and acoustic, from zoo staff or visitors) at parturition and during cub-rearing is also essential, but not sufficient. Insufficient land area proportions and unsuitable substrate conditions in zoos have historically been the primary cause of high cub mortality and physical and behavioral health problems among giant otters. For example, stress to the parents during cub-rearing due to inappropriate enclosure conditions has been the primary reason for cub neglect, abuse and infanticide.

In the wild, it has been suggested, although not systematically confirmed, that tourists cause similar stresses: disrupted lactation and denning, reduced hunting, and habitat abandonment are all risks. This sensitivity is matched by a strong protectiveness towards the young. All group members may aggressively charge intruders, including boats with humans in them.

The longest documented giant otter lifespan in the wild is eight years. In captivity, this may increase to 17, with an unconfirmed record of 19. The animal is susceptible to a variety of diseases, including canine parvovirus. Parasites, such as the larvae of flies and a variety of intestinal worms, also afflict the giant otter. Other causes of death include accidents, gastroenteritis, infanticide, and epileptic seizures.

=== Hunting and diet ===
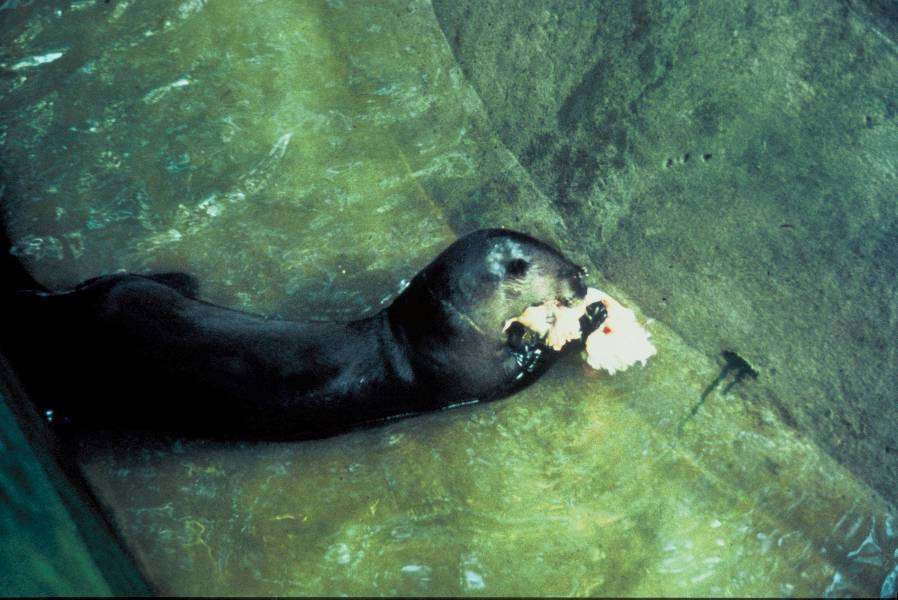
A captive giant otter, when feeding, grasps prey in its forepaws and begins eating immediately, at the head.

The giant otter is an apex predator, and its population status reflects the overall health of riverine ecosystems. It feeds mainly on fish, including cichlids, perch, characins (such as piranha), and catfish. One full-year study of giant otter scats in Amazonian Brazil found fish present in all fecal samples. Fish from the order Perciformes, particularly cichlids and perch, were seen in 97% of scats, and Characiformes, such as characins, in 86%. Fish remains were of medium-sized species that seem to prefer relatively shallow water, to the advantage of the visually oriented giant otter. Prey species found were also sedentary, generally swimming only short distances, which may aid the giant otter in predation. Hunting in shallow water has also been found to be more rewarding, with water depth less than 0.6 metres (2.0 ft) having the highest success rate. The giant otter seems to be opportunistic, taking whatever species are most locally abundant. If fish are unavailable, it will also take crabs, other crustaceans, snakes, and even small caimans and anacondas.

The species can hunt singly, in pairs, and in groups, relying on sharp eyesight to locate prey. In some cases, supposed cooperative hunting may be incidental, a result of group members fishing individually in close proximity; truly coordinated hunting may only occur where the prey cannot be taken by a single giant otter, such as with small green anacondas and juvenile black caiman. The giant otter seems to prefer prey fish that are generally immobile on river bottoms in clear water. Prey chase is rapid and tumultuous, with lunges and twists through the shallows and few missed targets. The otter can attack from both above and below, swiveling at the last instant to clamp the prey in its jaws. Giant otters catch their own food and consume it immediately; they grasp the fish firmly between the forepaws and begin eating noisily at the head. Carter and Rosas have found captive adult animals consume around 10% of their body weight daily—about 3 kilograms (7 lb), in keeping with findings in the wild.

== Ecology ==
=== Habitat ===
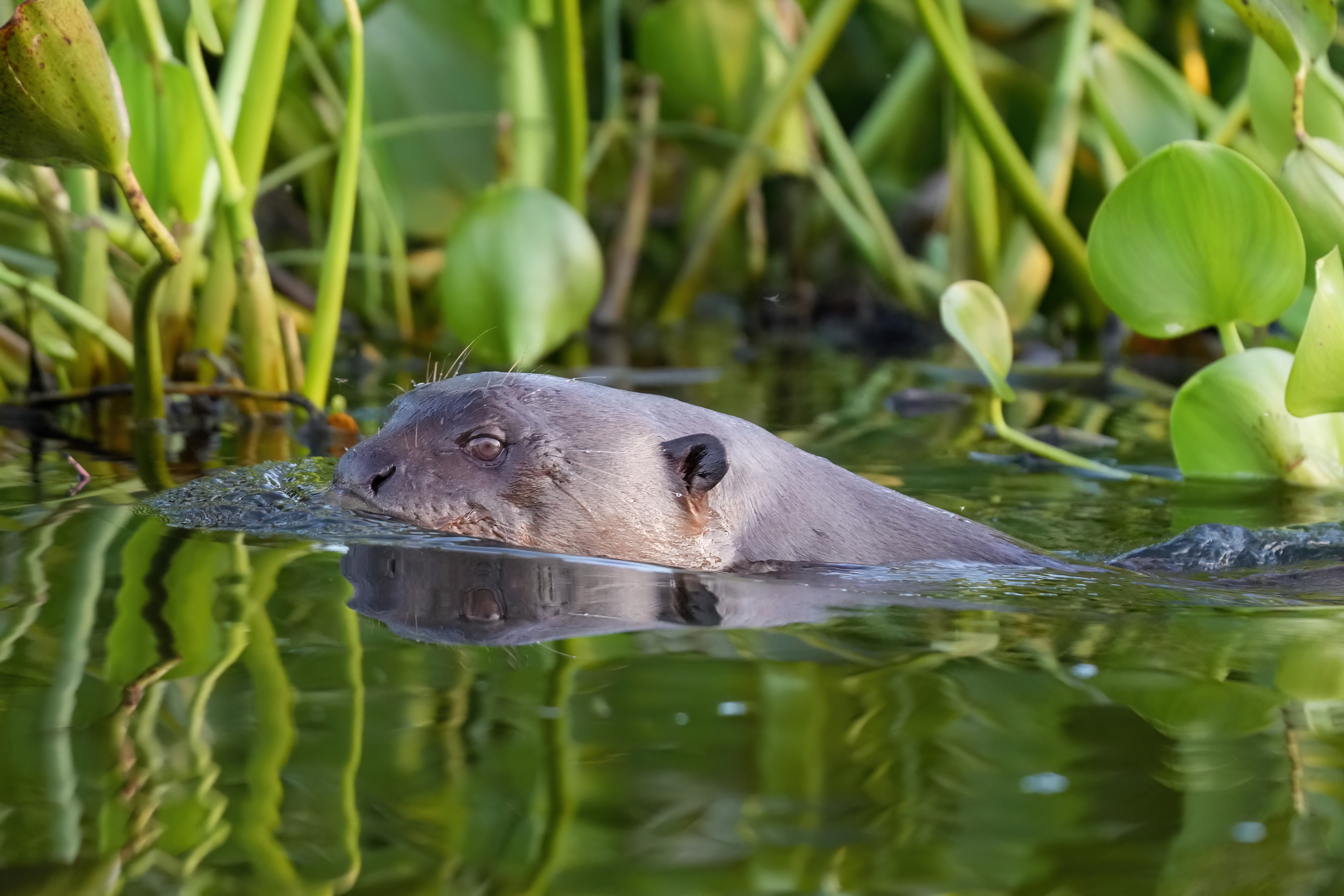
Giant otter swimming in the Pantanal, Brazil

The species is amphibious, although primarily terrestrial. It occurs in freshwater rivers and streams, which generally flood seasonally. Other water habitats include freshwater springs and permanent freshwater lakes. Four specific vegetation types occur on one important creek in Suriname: riverbank high forest, floodable mixed marsh and high swamp forest, floodable low marsh forest, and grass islands and floating meadows within open areas of the creek itself. Duplaix identified two critical factors in habitat selection: food abundance, which appears to positively correlate to shallow water, and low sloping banks with good cover and easy access to preferred water types. The giant otter seems to choose clear, black waters with rocky or sandy bottoms over silty, saline, and white waters.

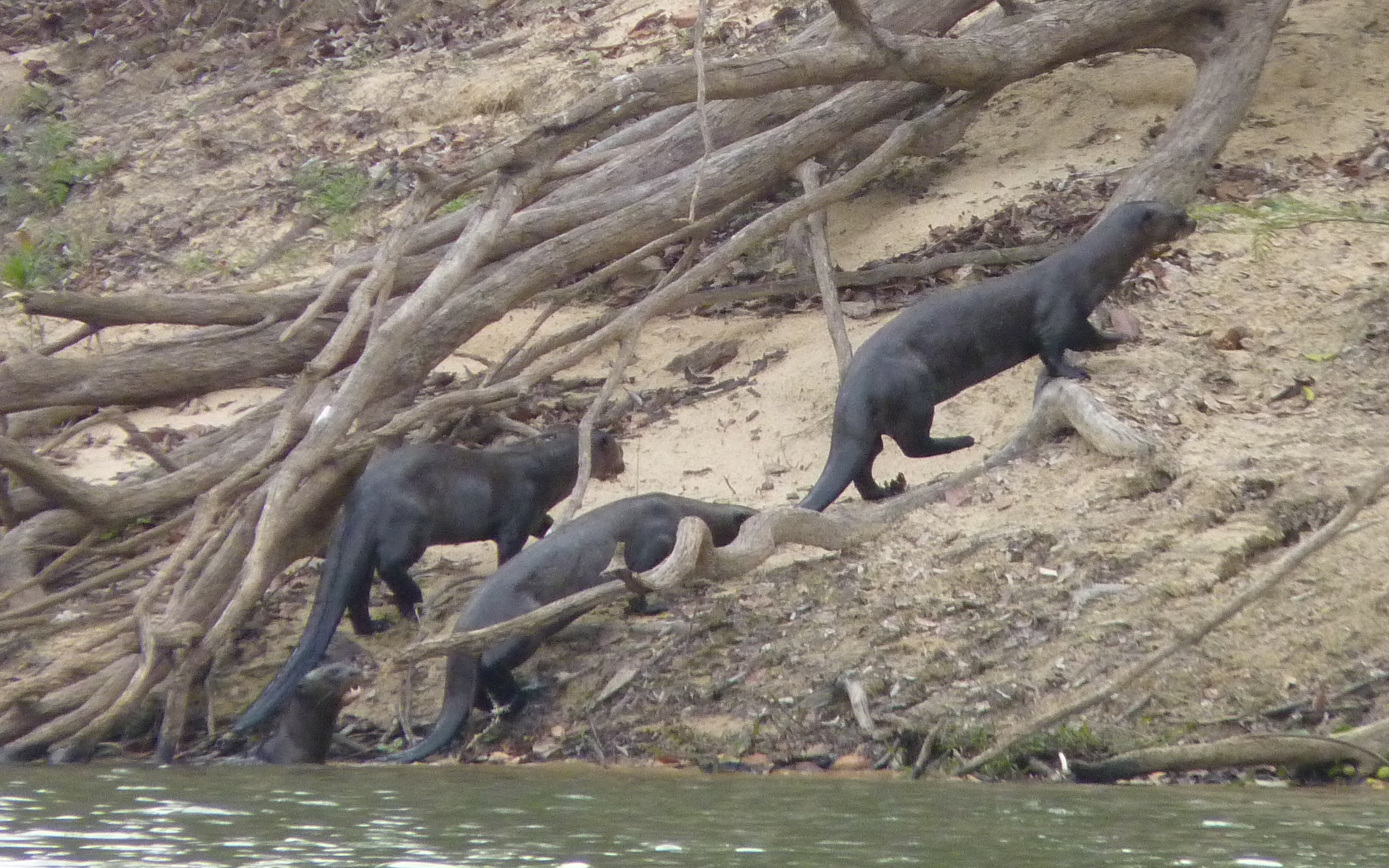
A group of four giant otters emerging from the water to patrol a campsite on the riverbank at Cantão State Park

Giant otters use areas beside rivers for building dens, campsites, and latrines. They clear significant amounts of vegetation while building their campsites. One report suggests maximum areas 28 m (92 ft) long and 15 m (49 ft) wide, well-marked by scent glands, urine, and feces to signal territory. Carter and Rosas found average areas a third this size. Giant otters adopt communal latrines beside campsites, and dig dens with a handful of entrances, typically under root systems or fallen trees. One report found between three and eight campsites, clustered around feeding areas. In seasonally flooded areas, the giant otter may abandon campsites during the wet season, dispersing to flooded forests in search of prey. Giant otters may adopt preferred locations perennially, often on high ground. These can become quite extensive, including "backdoor" exits into forests and swamps, away from the water. Otters do not visit or mark every site daily, but usually patrol all of them, often by a pair of otters in the morning.

Research generally takes place in the dry season and an understanding of the species' overall habitat use remains partial. An analysis of dry season range size for three otter groups in Ecuador found areas between 0.45 and 2.79 square kilometres (0.17 and 1.08 sq mi). Utreras presumed habitat requirements and availability would differ dramatically in the rainy season: estimating range sizes of 1.98 to as much as 19.55 square kilometres (0.76 to 7.55 sq miles) for the groups. Other researchers suggest approximately 7 square kilometres (2.7 sq mi) and note a strong inverse correlation between sociality and home range size; the highly social giant otter has smaller home range sizes than would be expected for a species of its mass. Population densities varied with a high of 1.2/km^{2} (3.1/sq mi) reported in Suriname and with a low of 0.154/km^{2} (0.40/sq mi) found in Guyana.

In 2021, conservationists at Fundación Rewilding spotted a wild giant otter swimming in the Bermejo River in Impenetrable National Park, located in the Chaco province of northeast Argentina.

=== Predation and competition ===
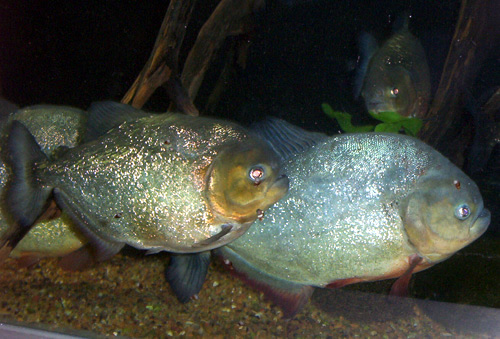
Characins such as piranha species are prey for the giant otter, but these aggressive fish may also pose a danger. Duplaix speculated that piranhas may attack giant otters.

Adult giant otters living in family groups have no known serious natural predators; however, there are some accounts of black caimans in Peru and yacare caimans in the Pantanal preying on giant otters. In addition, solitary animals and young may be vulnerable to attacks by the jaguar, cougar, and green anaconda, but this is based on historical reports, not direct observation. Pups are more vulnerable, and may be taken by black caiman, although adults are constantly mindful of stray young, and will harass and fight off possible predators. When in the water, the giant otter faces danger from animals not strictly preying upon it: the electric eel and stingray are potentially deadly if stumbled upon, and piranha may be capable of at least taking bites out of a giant otter, as evidenced by scarring on individuals.

Even if without direct predation, the giant otter must still compete with other predators for food resources. Duplaix documented interaction with the Neotropical otter. While the two species are sympatric (with overlapping ranges) during certain seasons, there appeared to be no serious conflict. The smaller neotropical otter is far more shy, less noisy, and less social; at about a third the weight of the giant otter, it is more vulnerable to predation, hence, a lack of conspicuousness is to its advantage. The neotropical otter is active during twilight and darkness, reducing the likelihood of conflict with the diurnal giant otter. Its smaller prey, different denning habits, and different preferred water types also reduce interaction.

Other species that prey upon similar food resources include the caimans (black caiman, spectacled caiman and yacare caiman) and large fish that are themselves piscivores. Gymnotids, such as the electric eel, and the large silurid catfish are among aquatic competitors. Two river dolphins, the tucuxi and Amazon river dolphin, might potentially compete with the giant otter, but different spatial use and dietary preferences suggest minimal overlap. Furthermore, Defler observed associations between giant otters and the Amazon river dolphins, and suggested that dolphins may benefit by fish fleeing from the otters. The spectacled caiman is another potential competitor and predator, but Duplaix found no conflict with the species in Suriname.

== Conservation status ==
The IUCN listed the giant otter as "endangered" in 1999; it had been considered "vulnerable" under all previous listings from 1982 when sufficient data had first become available. It is regulated internationally under Appendix I of the Convention on International Trade in Endangered Species of Wild Fauna and Flora (CITES) meaning commercial trade in specimens (including parts and derivatives) is prohibited.

=== Threats ===
The animal faces a variety of critical threats. Poaching has long been a problem. Statistics show between 1959 and 1969 Amazonian Brazil alone accounted for 1,000 to 3,000 pelts annually. The species was so thoroughly decimated, the number dropped to just 12 in 1971. The implementation of CITES in 1973 finally brought about significant hunting reductions, although demand did not disappear entirely: in the 1980s, pelt prices were as high as US$250 on the European market. The threat has been exacerbated by the otters' relative fearlessness and tendency to approach human beings. They are extremely easy to hunt, being active through the day and highly inquisitive. The animal's relatively late sexual maturity and complex social life makes hunting especially disastrous.

More recently, habitat destruction and degradation have become the principal dangers, and a further reduction of 50% is expected in giant otter numbers within the 25 years after 2020 (about the span of three generations of giant otters). Typically, loggers first move into rainforest, clearing the vegetation along riverbanks. Farmers follow, creating depleted soil and disrupted habitats. As human activity expands, giant otter home ranges become increasingly isolated. Subadults leaving in search of new territory find it impossible to set up family groups. Specific threats from human industry include unsustainable mahogany logging in parts of the giant otter range, and concentrations of mercury in its diet of fish, a byproduct of gold mining.

Other threats to the giant otter include conflict with fishermen, who often view the species as a nuisance (see below). Ecotourism also presents challenges: while it raises money and awareness for the animals, by its nature it also increases human effect on the species, both through associated development and direct disturbances in the field. A number of restrictions on land use and human intrusion are required to properly maintain wild populations. Schenck et al., who undertook extensive fieldwork in Peru in the 1990s, suggest specific "no-go" zones where the species is most frequently observed, offset by observation towers and platforms to allow viewing. Limits on the number of tourists at any one time, fishing prohibitions, and a minimum safe distance of 50 metres (164 ft) are proposed to offer further protection.

=== Distribution and population ===
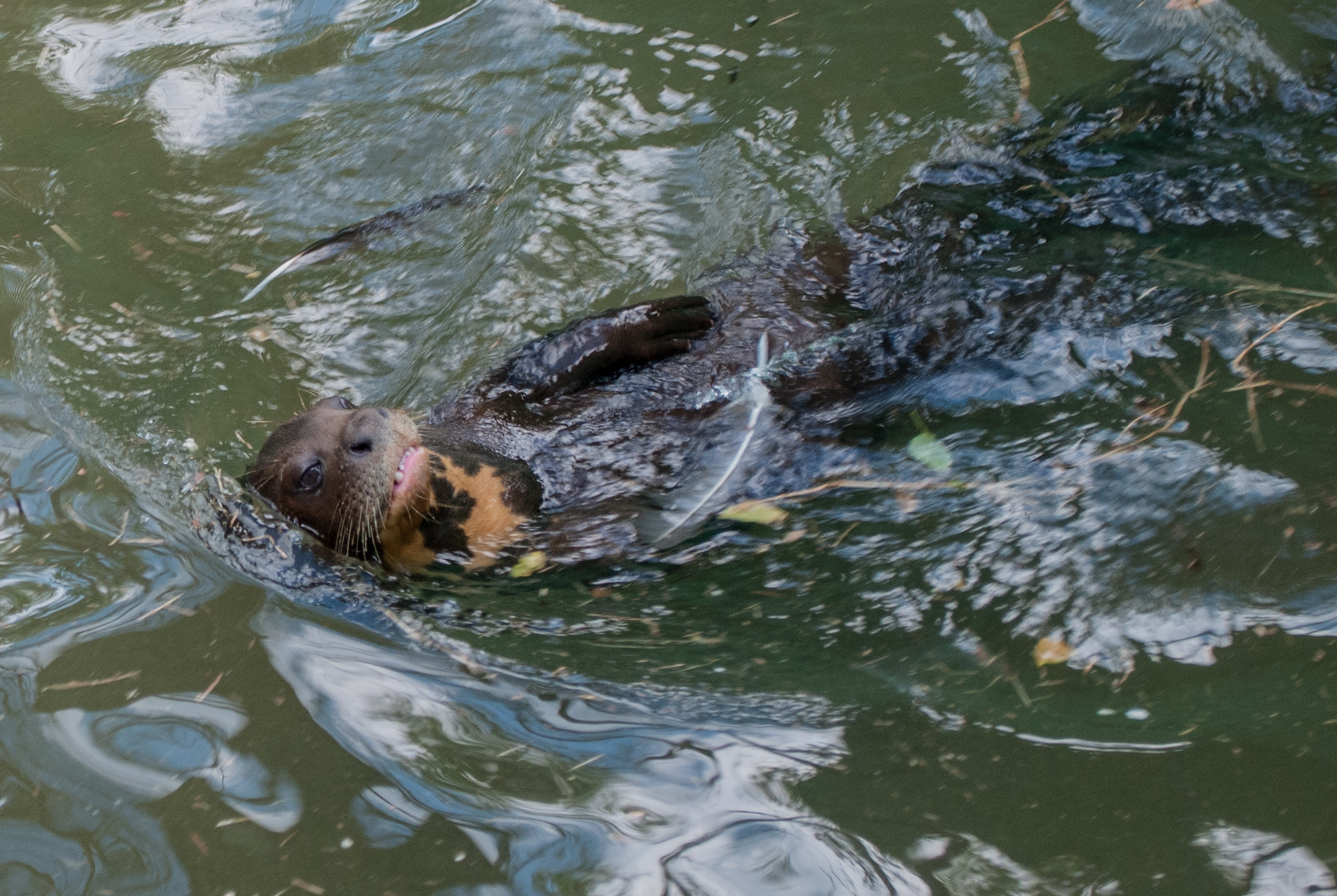
Giant otter from Venezuela

The giant otter has lost as much as 80% of its South American range. While still present in a number of north-central countries, giant otter populations are under considerable stress. The IUCN lists Bolivia, Brazil, Colombia, Ecuador, French Guiana, Guyana, Paraguay, Peru, Suriname, and Venezuela as current range countries. Given local extinctions, the species' range has become discontinuous. Total population numbers are difficult to estimate. Populations in Bolivia were once widespread but the country became a "black spot" on distribution maps after poaching between the 1940s and 1970s; a relatively healthy, but still small, population of 350 was estimated in the country in 2002. The species has likely been extirpated from southern Brazil, but in the west of the country, decreased hunting pressure in the critical Pantanal has led to very successful recolonization; an estimate suggests 1,000 or more animals in the region.

The Guianas are the last real stronghold of the giant otter. Suriname retains extensive forest cover and many protected areas; it is pictured above. Guyana is immediately to the west and French Guiana is immediately to the east.

As of 2020, the IUCN estimates that there may be 4,569 otters living in Brazil. A significant population lives in the wetlands of the central Araguaia River, and in particular within Cantão State Park, which, with its 843 oxbow lakes and extensive flooded forests and marshlands, is one of the best habitat patches for this species in Brazil.

Suriname still has significant forest cover and an extensive system of protected areas, much of which protects the giant otter. Duplaix returned to the country in 2000 and found the giant otter still present on the Kaburi Creek, a "jewel" of biodiversity, although increased human presence and land use suggests, sooner or later, the species may not be able to find suitable habitat for campsites. In a report for World Wildlife Fund in 2002, Duplaix was emphatic about the importance of Suriname and the other Guianas:

The three Guianas remain the last stronghold of giant otters in South America, with pristine giant otter habitat on some rivers and good giant otter densities overall—still, but for how long? The survival of the giant otter populations in the Guianas is essential to the survival of this endangered species in South America.

Other countries have taken a lead in designating protected areas in South America. In 2004, Peru created one of the largest conservation areas in the world, Alto Purús National Park, with an area similar in size to Belgium. The park harbors many endangered plants and animals, including the giant otter, and holds the world record for mammal diversity. Bolivia designated wetlands larger than the size of Switzerland as a freshwater protected area in 2001; these are also home to the giant otter.

== Interactions with indigenous peoples ==
Throughout its range, the giant otter interacts with indigenous groups, who often practice traditional hunting and fishing. A study of five indigenous communities in Colombia suggests native attitudes toward the animal are a threat: the otters are often viewed as a nuisance that interferes with fishing, and are sometimes killed. Even when told of the importance of the species to ecosystems and the danger of extinction, interviewees showed little interest in continuing to coexist with the species. School children, however, had a more positive impression of the animal.

In Suriname, the giant otter is not a traditional prey species for human hunters, which affords some protection. (One researcher has suggested the giant otter is hunted only in desperation due to its horrible taste.) The animal sometimes drowns in nets set across rivers and machete attacks by fishermen have been noted, according to Duplaix, but "tolerance is the rule" in Suriname. One difference in behavior was seen in the country in 2002: the normally inquisitive giant otters showed "active avoidance behavior with visible panic" when boats appeared. Logging, hunting, and pup seizure may have led groups to be far more wary of human activity.

Local people sometimes take pups for the exotic pet trade or as pets for themselves, but the animal rapidly grows to become unmanageable. Duplaix relates the story of an Arawak Indian who took two pups from their parents. While revealing of the affection held for the animals, the seizure was a profound blow to the breeding pair, which went on to lose their territory to competitors.

The species has also appeared in the folklore of the region. It plays an important role in the mythology of the Achuar people, where giant otters are seen as a form of the tsunki, or water spirits: they are a sort of "water people" who feed on fish. They appear in a fish poisoning legend where they assist a man who has wasted his sexual energy, creating the anacondas of the world from his distressed and extended genitals.

The Bororó people have a legend on the origin of tobacco smoking: those who used the leaf improperly by swallowing it were punished by being transformed into giant otters; the Bororo also associate the giant otter with fish and with fire. A Ticuna legend has it that the giant otter exchanged places with the jaguar: the story says jaguar formerly lived in the water and the giant otter came to the land only to eat. The indigenous Kichwa peoples from Amazonian Peru believed in a world of water where Yaku runa reigned as mother of the water and was charged with caring for fish and animals. Giant otters served as Yaku runa's canoes. A Maxacali creation story suggests that the practice of otter fishing may have been prevalent in the past.
