= Kapoxó language =

Extinct language of Brazil

Kapoxó
- Capoxo
- Native to: Brazil
- Ethnicity: Kapoxó
- Era: attested 1818
- Language family: Macro-Jê: Maxakalían; Kapoxó

Language codes
- ISO 639-3: None (mis)
- Glottolog: capo1236
- Linguasphere: 89-HAA-aa
- 89-HAA-ac

Kapoxó (Capoxo, Kaposho) is an extinct Maxakalian language of Brazil. Kumanaxó and Panhame are closely related varieties.

== Documentation ==
Kapoxó is documented in a word list collected in 1818, which was published in Martius, 1863: 170-172.

== Geographical distribution ==
Kapoxó was historically spoken on the Araçuaí River in Minas Gerais, Brazil.

== Classification ==
Aside from being a member of the Nuclear Maxakalí subgroup, characterized by certain shared innovations, it is very similar to such varieties as Makoní, Kapoxó, Panhame, and is also related to Ritual Maxakalí, which is more archaic than modern Maxakalí.

== Vocabulary ==
Selected vocabulary from Kapoxó, Kumanaxó, and Panhame
Gloss	Kumanaxó
to hide	schatome
soul	njajmi
water	cona-an-cunaan
beard	njidaú
mixed	njonain
star	aschim
head	patanjon
teeth	schuoj
hand	agnibktän
lightning	ithóg tänjanam
fire	kescham
sun	apucoj
earth	aam
tree	abaay
