= Water dog (disambiguation) =

A water dog is a type of gundog bred to flush and retrieve game from water.

Water dog, waterdog or water-dog may also refer to:

== Animals ==
=== Dogs ===
- Barbet (a.k.a. French water dog)
- Cantabrian Water Dog
- Lagotto Romagnolo (a.k.a. Italian water dog)
- Moscow Water Dog, extinct breed
- Portuguese Water Dog
- Spanish Water Dog
- St. John's water dog, extinct
- Tweed Water Spaniel, extinct breed

=== Other animals ===
- Waterdog, the gilled, aquatic larval form of the tiger salamander, often sold as pets or fishing bait
- Waterdog, a common name for the genus Necturus, which can also be called mudpuppy
- Water-dog, a former colloquial term for the giant otter

== Other ==
- The Water Dog, a 1914 American film starring Fatty Arbuckle
- Water Dog Lake, Belmont, California
- Water Dog (Chinese Zodiac), the 59th combination of the sexagenary cycle
