= Otter fishing =

Using trained otters to fish

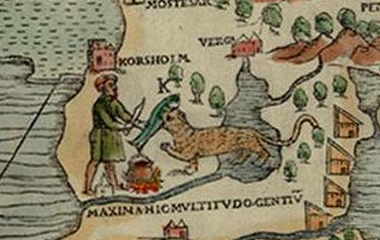
Cropped extract of Carta Marina by Olaus Magnus dated 1539 showing an otter retrieving a fish for its master

Otter fishing is a fishing technique which uses trained otters to fish in rivers. This method has been practised since the 6th century in various parts of the world, and is still practiced in southern Bangladesh.

== History ==
Huntsman: Come, Gentlemen! come, all! let's go to the place where we put down the Otter. Look you! hereabout it was that she kennelled; look you! here it was indeed; for here's her young ones, no less than five: come, let us kill them all.
Piscator: No: I pray, Sir, save me one, and I'll try if I can make her tame, as I know an ingenious gentleman in Leicestershire, Mr. Nich. Segrave, has done; who hath not only made her tame, but to catch fish, and do many other things of much pleasure.
Huntsman: Take one with all my heart; but let us kill the rest. And now let's go to an honest ale-house, where we may have a cup of good barley wine, and sing "Old Rose", and all of us rejoice together.

— Izaak Walton (1653) The Compleat Angler. Chapter II – The second day On the Otter and the Chub – Piscator, Venator, Huntsman, and Hostess.

Otter fishing has been practiced historically in a number of regions including Central Europe, Northern Africa, the British Isles, Scandinavia, South Asia, Southeast Asia, China and South America.

The earliest records of otter fishing are from the Yangtze region of China during the Tang dynasty (618–907) and was observed in the 13th century by Marco Polo on the Yangtze River. Otter fishing in China was practiced for subsistence and also collectively for profit. The Chinese reputedly learned the techniques from the fishermen of Southeast Asia. In India, otter fishing was practiced in the Indus and Ganges river basins, in Bengal and in South India along the Coromandel Coast.

Otter fishing was known in Europe from as early as the 16th century. The Scandinavians trained otters for catching trout. Olaus Magnus, the Archbishop of Uppsala, published a tome in 1555, De Gentibus Septentrionalibus (On Northern Peoples), which includes a sketch of a fishing otter. One of the motifs of Magnus's 1539 map of Scandinavia, Carta marina, is an otter fetching a fish for its master, who is ready with a knife and a cooking vessel on the fire.

Fishing with otters was known in England, Scotland, Germany and Poland. The first mention of otter fishing in the British Isles dates to 1480, while the method for training otters is described in the 1653 book on angling by Izaak Walton, The Compleat Angler. Individual sportsmen in the Americas and Europe have also used otters for sport fishing. British sportsmen who had served in South India during the early years of the British Raj had been known to import this practice to their homes in Europe.

Otter fishing is also reported from Central and South America. A Maxacali creation story from Brazil suggests that the practice of otter fishing may have been prevalent in the past. Fishermen from Guyana used a different tactic – they would observe where an otter deposited its catch and later purloin the fish.

== Method ==
In the Old World, two otter species have been primarily used in otter fishing – the Eurasian otter (Lutra lutra), chiefly in Europe and North Africa, and the smooth-coated otter (Lutrogale perspicillata), mostly in South Asia and China. And in the New World, the giant otter (Pteronura brasiliensis) has been used, usually in South America.

Olaus Magnus wrote that the otter often fetches the catch for its master but "once in awhile forgets and eats the fish". Izaak Walton's 1653 book describes otter pups, three to four months old, being domesticated and trained. The otters were muzzled to prevent them eating fish and secured by lines to their master. The otters then chased fish in a pond into a net. Another technique was to submerge nets and get the otters to shepherd the fish into them, after which the nets, along with otters and catch, were retrieved.

In ancient China, the otter wore a leather harness on its body to which an iron chain was attached. The other end of the chain was either secured to the fisherman's boat or to a bamboo pole. The fisherman would cast his circular net, weighted at the edges, and pull it in. As the net was being pulled in, the otter would be introduced into the net through a small opening. The otter's role was to search for and disturb fish hiding in nooks and crannies and force them into the net so that they were trapped. The otter was subsequently rewarded in the case of a good catch. The practice of using otters to drive fish into nets was prevalent in Asia and is still practiced in southern Bangladesh.

== Bangladesh ==
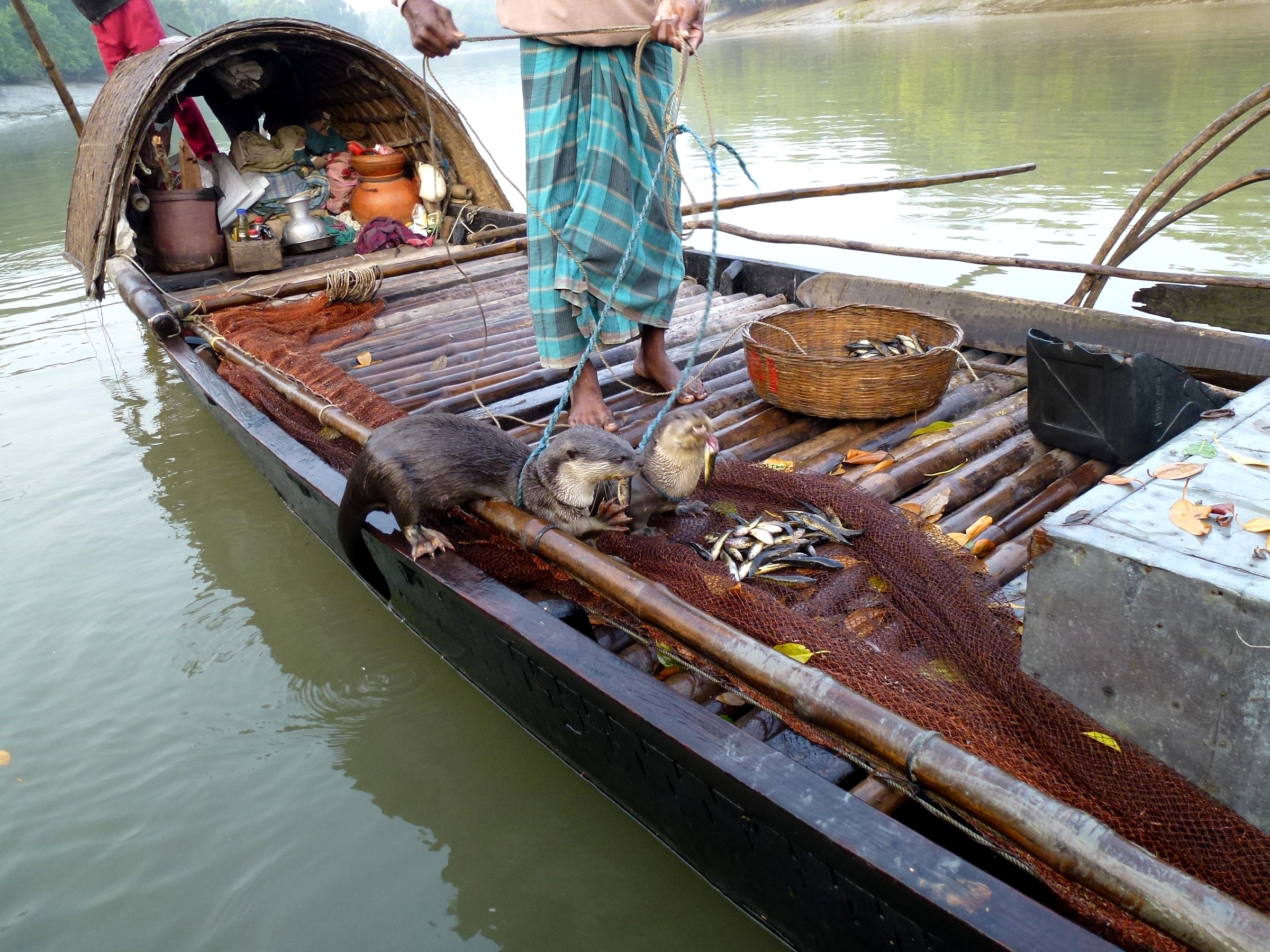
Otter fishermen in the Sundarbans National Park, Bangladesh

Otter fishing is still practiced in Narail and Khulna districts, near the Sunderbans in southern Bangladesh. Here fishing with otters is a traditional practice in families, passed down through the generations by fishermen who breed the otters and train them to chase the fish into their nets. In the past, both Lutra lutra and Lutrogale perspicillata were used for otter fishing, but today, only L. perspicillata is used. Otter fishing is usually done at night between 9 PM and 5 AM. The average catch by a single boat in a night ranges from 4 to 12 kilograms (8.8 to 26.5 lb) of crabs, fish and shrimp. Feeroz et al. (2011) recorded a population of 176 domesticated otters amongst 46 groups of fishermen in these districts, of which 138 were working animals. Lack of fish, changes sought in livelihoods by the young and more economical methods of fishing have reduced the number of otter fishermen drastically.

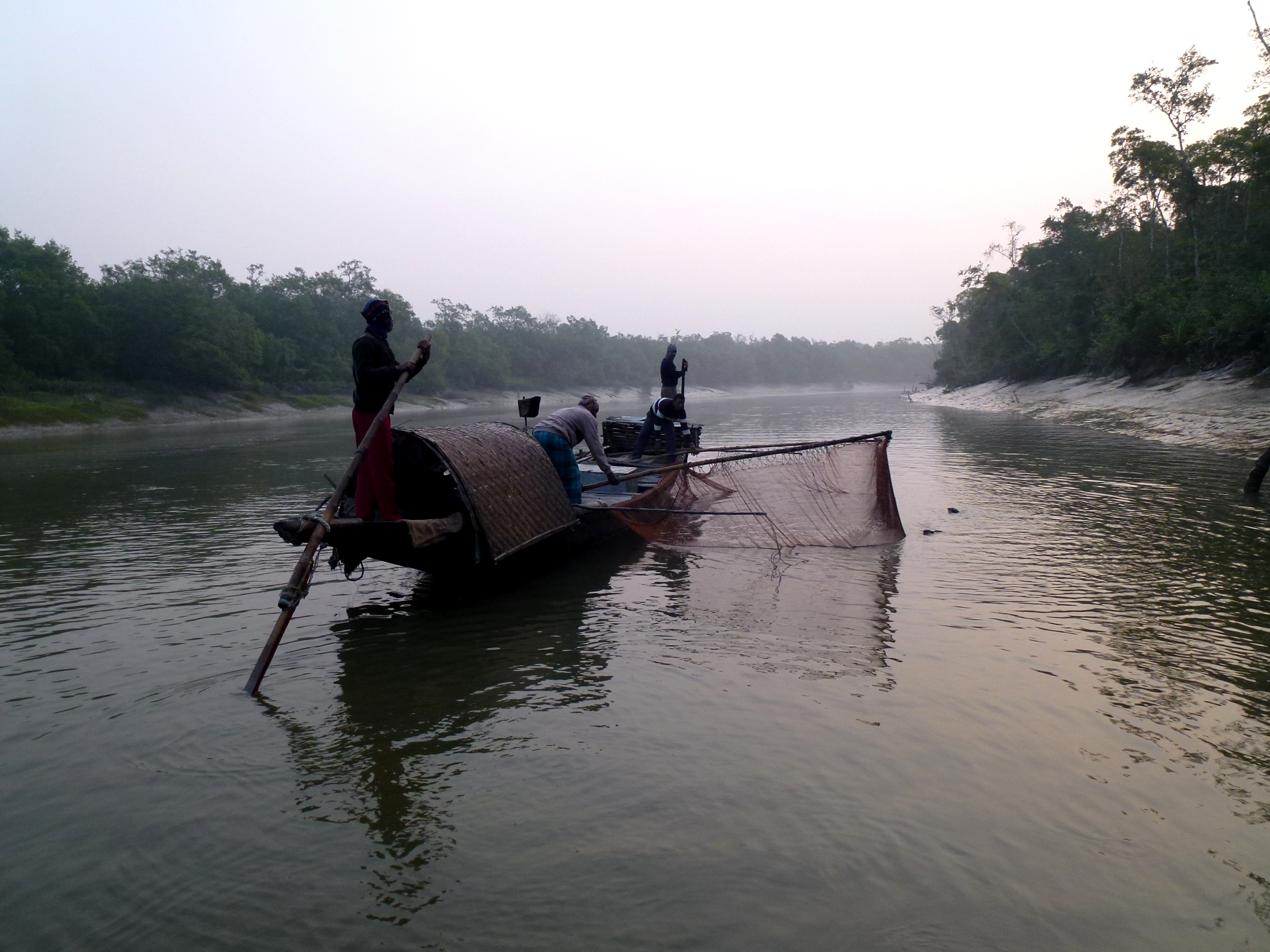
Otter fishermen with nets, in Bangladesh

== See also ==
- Cormorant fishing
