= Maxakali =

Ethnic group of Brazil

Tikmũ’ũn
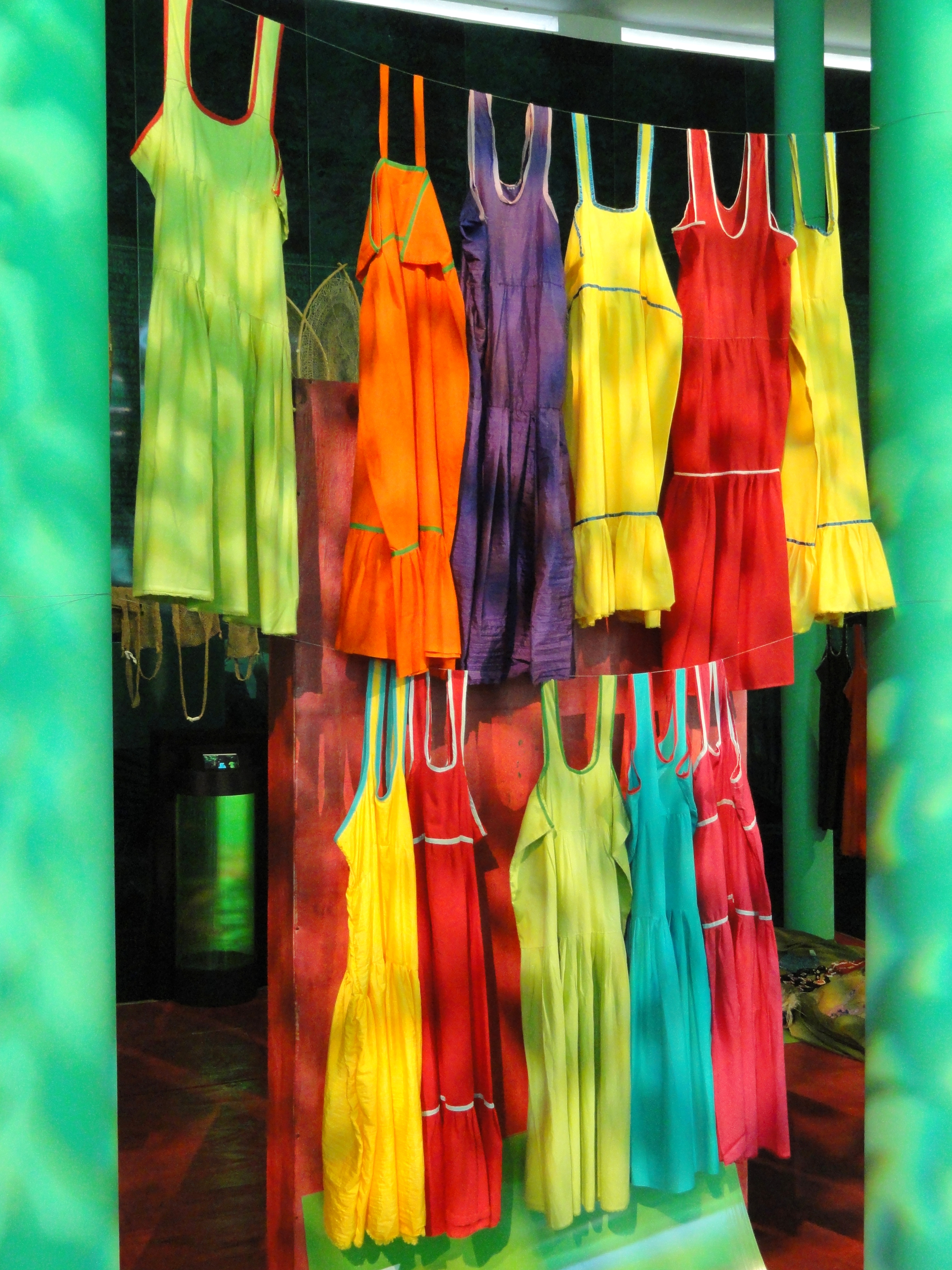
- Historic Maxakali dresses

Total population
- 2,407 (2020)

Regions with significant populations
- Brazil (Minas Gerais)

Languages
- Maxakalí

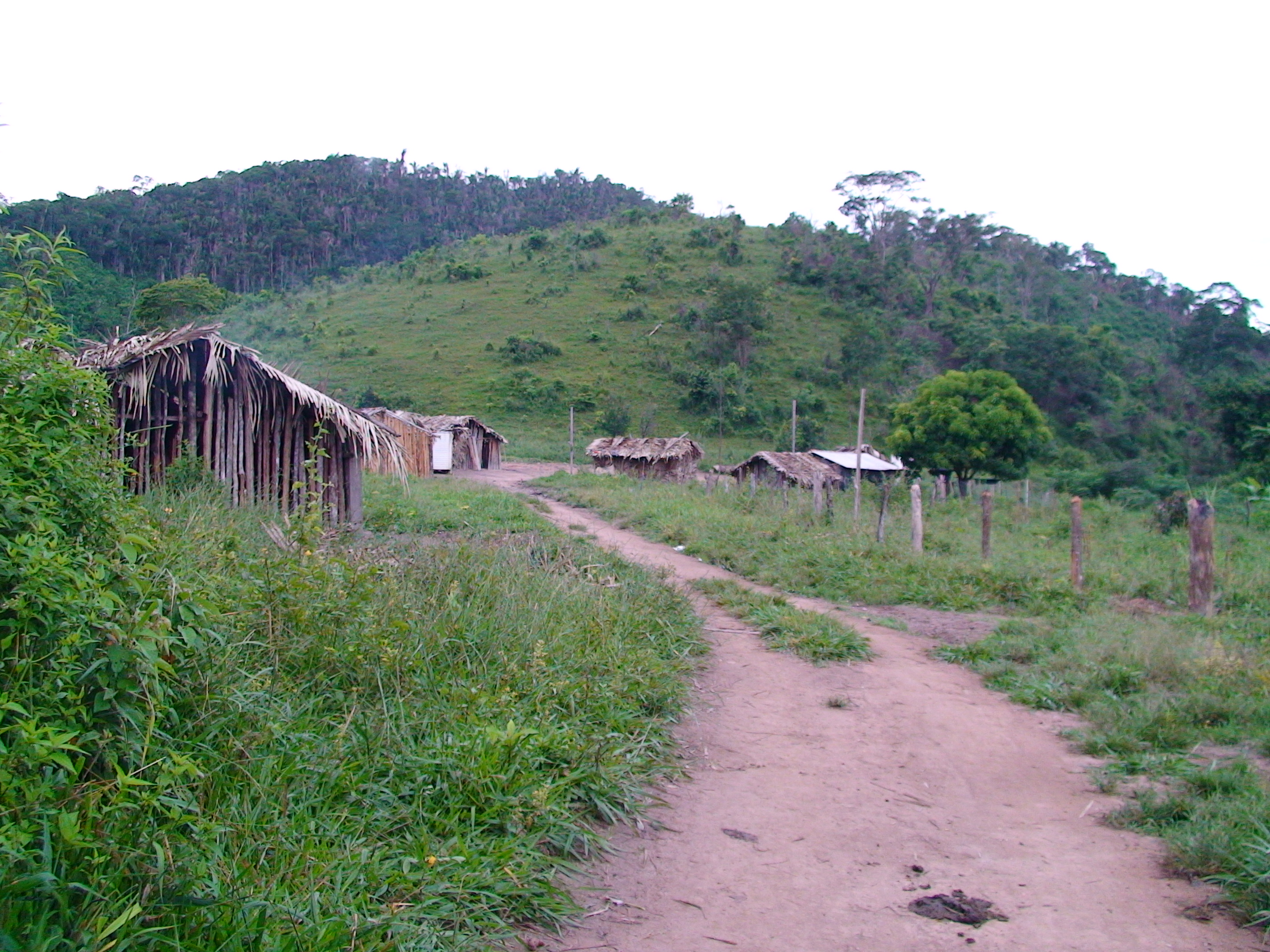
A village of the Maxacali

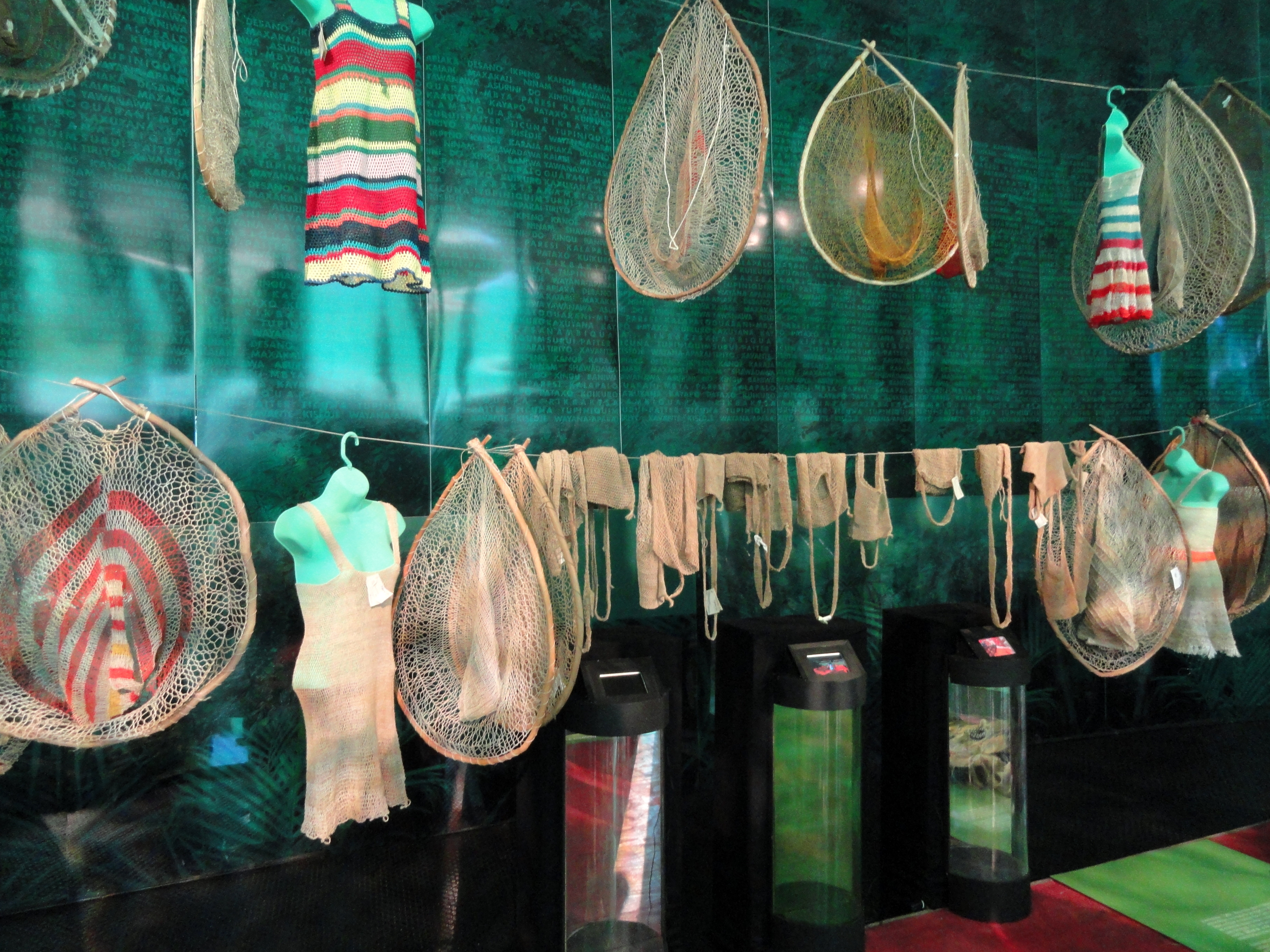
Fishing nets of the Maxacali

The Maxakali are an ethnic group of indigenous people in Brazil.

== Geography and ethnology ==
The Maxakali live in the districts of Santa Helena de Minas, Bertópolis, Ladainha and Teófilo Otoni in the federal state Minas Gerais. The 400 members of the group live in isolation and poverty. They speak the Maxakalí language, which is one of the Maxakalían languages. This language is notable for having neither nasal nor fricative consonants contrastively. There are mixed marriages these days.

== Mythology ==
In the Maxakali creation story the creator Topa gave them a tame otter for otter fishing. This would help them to get always something to eat, as long as they do not forget, to give him the three largest fishes that he caught. When the husband of the grand daughter of the otter keeper neglected this rule, the community was punished by a heavy flooding.
