= Pataxó language =

Macro-Jê language of Brazil

Pataxó
- Patxohã, Southern Pataxó
- Native to: Brazil
- Region: Bahia, Minas Gerais
- Ethnicity: Pataxó people
- Era: attested 1826
- Revival: 1998
- Language family: Macro-Jê: Maxakalían; Maxakalí group; Pataxó

Official status
- Official language in: Brazil (Porto Seguro, Santa Cruz Cabrália)

Language codes
- ISO 639-3: None (mis)
- Glottolog: sout3439

Pataxó (Patashó, Patachó, sometimes called Southern Pataxó to distinguish from Pataxó-Hãhãhãe) is an extinct Maxakalían language of Brazil formerly spoken by the Pataxó people of the Bahia region, and of Minas Gerais, Pôsto Paraguassu in Itabuna municipality. The 12,865 individuals in the Pataxó tribe now speak Portuguese instead, though they retain a few Pataxó words, as well as some words from neighbouring peoples. It has been revived in a form called Patxohã. Due to poor documentation, many elements of Pataxó grammar, including the entire syntax, needed to be entirely reconstructed. Patxohã was declared an official language in the city of Porto Seguro, Bahia, in 2023. This was followed by Santa Cruz Cabrália two years later.

== Vocabulary ==
gloss	Pataxó	Notes
(the) arm	agnipcaton	
old	hitap	
eye	anguá	
axe	cachü	palatal ch; ü like ö
tapir	amachy	German ch
fishing hook	kutiam	
tree	mniomipticajo	
belly	etä	unclear
leg	patá	
bite	kaangtschaha	
mountain	egnetopne	unclear; final e short
bed	miptschap	
blow	ekepohó	initial e short
blood	enghäm	unclear
break	tschahá	
bow	poitang	
brother	eketannoy	an as in French
chest	ekäp	
calabash	totsá	
canoe	mibcoy	
hummingbird	petékéton	
thumb	niip-ketó	
village	canan-patashi	
thorn	mihiam	
eat	oknikenang	
one, alone	apetiäenam	
earth, land	aham	
egg	petetiäng	
(it is) good	nomaisom	
it is not good	mayogená	ge as in German
feather	potoitan	
fish	maham	
flesh	uniin	
finger	gnipketó	
shotgun	kehekui	palatal e
enemy, to fight	nionaikikepá	
river	kekatá	
lazy	noktiokpetam	
frog	mauá	
sloth	gneüy	unclear
fat	tomaisom	
friend, comrade	itioy	
god	niamissum	
large	nioketoiná	
patience	niaistó	
to shine	niongnitschingá	
dog	kokä	
chicken	tschuctacaco	
hair	epotoy	
neck	may	
horn	niotschokaptschoi	
yes	han	as in French
child	tschauaum	
cold	nuptschaaptangmang	
small	kenetketó	
head	atpatoy	
come!	nanä	
short	nionham-ketom	
sick	aktschopetam	
long	miptoy	
thigh	tschakepketon	on as in French
liver	akiopkanay	
to run	topakautschi	
man	nionnactim	
mother	atön	ö between ö and e
corn	pastschon	
manioc	cohom̄	
knife	amanay	
girl	nactamanian	
to paint	noytanatschä	
night	temenieypelan	
black person	tomeningná	
no	tapetapocpay	
nose	insicap	
nail (finger- and toe-)	nion-menan	an as in French
ox	juctan	
arrow	pohoy	
horse	amaschep	
paca	tschapá	
red	eoató	eo pronounced separately
sun	mayon	
stone	micay	
son	nioaactschum	
to die	nokschoon	
pig	schaem	e like palatal ü
to sing	sumniatá	
to sleep	somnaymohon	
to stink	niunghaschinguá	
sister	ehä	

== Bibliography ==
- Bomfim, Anari Braz (2012). Patxohã, "língua de guerreiro": um estudo sobre o processo de retomada da língua Pataxó (PDF) (Dissertation) (in Brazilian Portuguese). Universidade Federal da Bahia.
- Bomfim, Anari Braz (2017-05-31). "Patxohã: a retomada da língua do povo Pataxó". Revista Linguíʃtica (in Brazilian Portuguese). 13 (1): 303–327. ISSN 2238-975X.
- Bomfim, Anari Braz; Lima, Suzi (2020-10-01). "Count and mass nouns in Patxohã". Linguistic Variation. 20 (2): 324–335. doi:10.1075/lv.00024.bom. ISSN 2211-6834.
- Nelson, Jessica Fae (2023-10-01). "On Pataxó Hãhãhãe and Maxakalí". International Journal of American Linguistics. 89 (4): 531–563. doi:10.1086/726150. ISSN 0020-7071.
- Nikulin, Andrey (2020). Proto-Macro-Jê: um estudo reconstrutivo (PDF). etnolinguistica.org (Thesis).
- Wied-Neuwied, Maximilian Alexander Philipp, Prinz von (1820). Reise nach Brasilien in den Jahren 1815 bis 1817. Getty Research Institute. Frankfurt a.M.: Gedruckt und verlegt by Heinrich Ludwig Brönner.
- Wied-Neuwied, Maximilian Alexander Philipp, Prinz von (1821). Voyage au Brésil, dans les années 1815, 1816 et 1817 (in French). Vol. 3.
- Fonseca, Josemir Tadeu (2023-04-20). "Câmara aprova projeto do executivo municipal que reconhece a Patxôhã como língua cooficial de Porto Seguro - Jojô Notícias" (in Brazilian Portuguese).
- "Pataxó - Indigenous Peoples in Brazil". pib.socioambiental.org.
- "Questão de identidade: Língua Patxôhã se torna oficial em Cabrália". A TARDE (in Brazilian Portuguese). 2025-11-13.
