= Maxakalían languages =

Language family of eastern Brazil

Maxakalían
- Mashakalian
- Geographic distribution: Brazil
- Linguistic classification: Macro-Jê: Trans-São Francisco; Maxakalían
- Subdivisions: Nuclear Maxakalí; Maxakali Kapoxó † Monoxó † Makoni † Pataxó † Hahaháy † Koropo †: Malali †

Language codes
- Glottolog: maxa1246
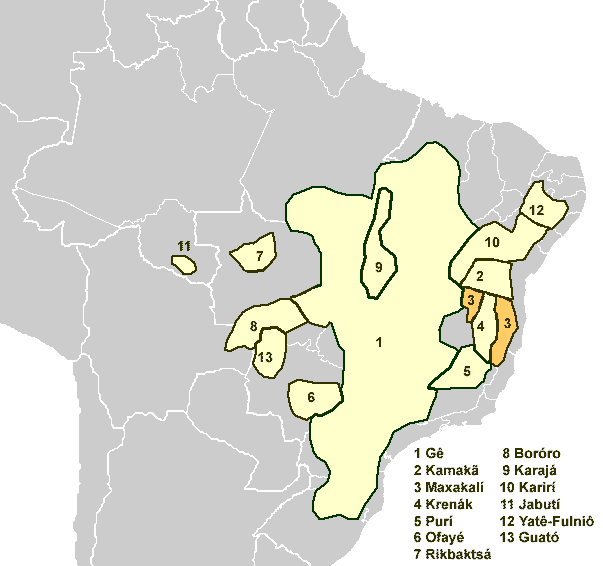
- Distribution of Maxakalian languages among the Macro-Jê family

- Map of the Maxakalian languages (excluding Koropo)

The Maxakalían languages (also Mashakalían) are a group of related indigenous languages of Brazil, named after Maxakalí, the one surviving language in the group. Linguists differ in the other, extinct, languages they identify as part of the group, many of which are poorly attested. The Maxakalían group is today usually considered part of the Macro-Jê language family.

Maxakalían languages were first classified into the Jê languages. It was only in 1931 that Čestmír Loukotka separated them from the Jê family. Alfred Métraux and Curt Nimuendajú considered the Maxakalían family isolated from others. John Alden Mason suggests a connection with the Macro-Jê stock, confirmed by Aryon Rodrigues.

== Languages ==
Mason (1950) noted resemblances with a few other extinct languages of the area: Pataxó, Malalí and Coropó. Previously, there was some debate as to whether or not they constituted members of the Maxakalían family. However, Coropó was formerly sometimes thought to be a Purian language.

- Malalí †
- Nuclear Maxakalían
  - Pataxó languages
    - Pataxó (Patashó, Southern Pataxó) † (retain some words, revival movement)
    - Pataxó-Hãhãhãe † (Northern Pataxó)
  - Maxakalí (Mashacalí) (1,270 speakers)
  - "Makoní complex"
    - Maxakalí of songs and rituals
    - Makoní †
    - Kapoxó–Kumanaxó–Panhame †
    - Monoxó †
  - Koropó † (attested by two word lists)

Maxakalí is a sister of Krenák and possibly also Kamakã. Together, they form a Trans-São Francisco branch within the Macro-Jê language phylum in Nikulin's (2020) classification.

Currently, Maxakali (excluding Old Machacari) is the only living language, while all other languages are extinct. The extinct Maxakalian varieties are mainly attested from 19th-century word lists:

- Mashacari (Augustin Saint-Hilaire, 1830: 274; Wied, 1820: 509–510) [collected in 1816–1817]
- Kapoxó (Martius, 1863: 170–172) [collected in 1818]
- Monoxó (Munuchú) (Saint-Hilaire, 1830: 181) [collected in 1817]
- Makoni (Saint-Hilaire, 1830: 212; Martius, 1863: 173–176; Wied, 1820: 512–513) [collected in 1816–1818]
- Malali (Saint-Hilaire, 1830: 181; Martius, 1863: 207–208; Wied, 1820: 511–512) [collected in 1816–1818]

Pataxó as documented by Prince Maximilian of Wied-Neuwied (1820: 510–511) in 1816 is distinct from Pataxó-Hãhãhãe. Pataxó-Hãhãhãe was spoken into the 20th century and has been documented by Pickering in Meader (1978: 45–50), Scheibe in Loukotka (1963: 32–33), and Silva & Rodrigues (1982).

== Bibliography ==
- Campbell, Lyle. (1997). American Indian languages: The Historical Linguistics of Native America. New York: Oxford University Press. ISBN 0-19-509427-1.
- Kaufman, Terrence. (1990). Language history in South America: What We Know and How to Know More. In D. L. Payne (Ed.), Amazonian Linguistics: Studies in Lowland South American Languages (pp. 13–67). Austin: University of Texas Press. ISBN 0-292-70414-3.
- Kaufman, Terrence. (1994). The Native Languages of South America. In C. Mosley & R. E. Asher (Eds.), Atlas of the World's Languages (pp. 46–76). London: Routledge.
