= Mucuri River =

River in Brazil

Coordinates: 18°05′37″S 39°32′49″W

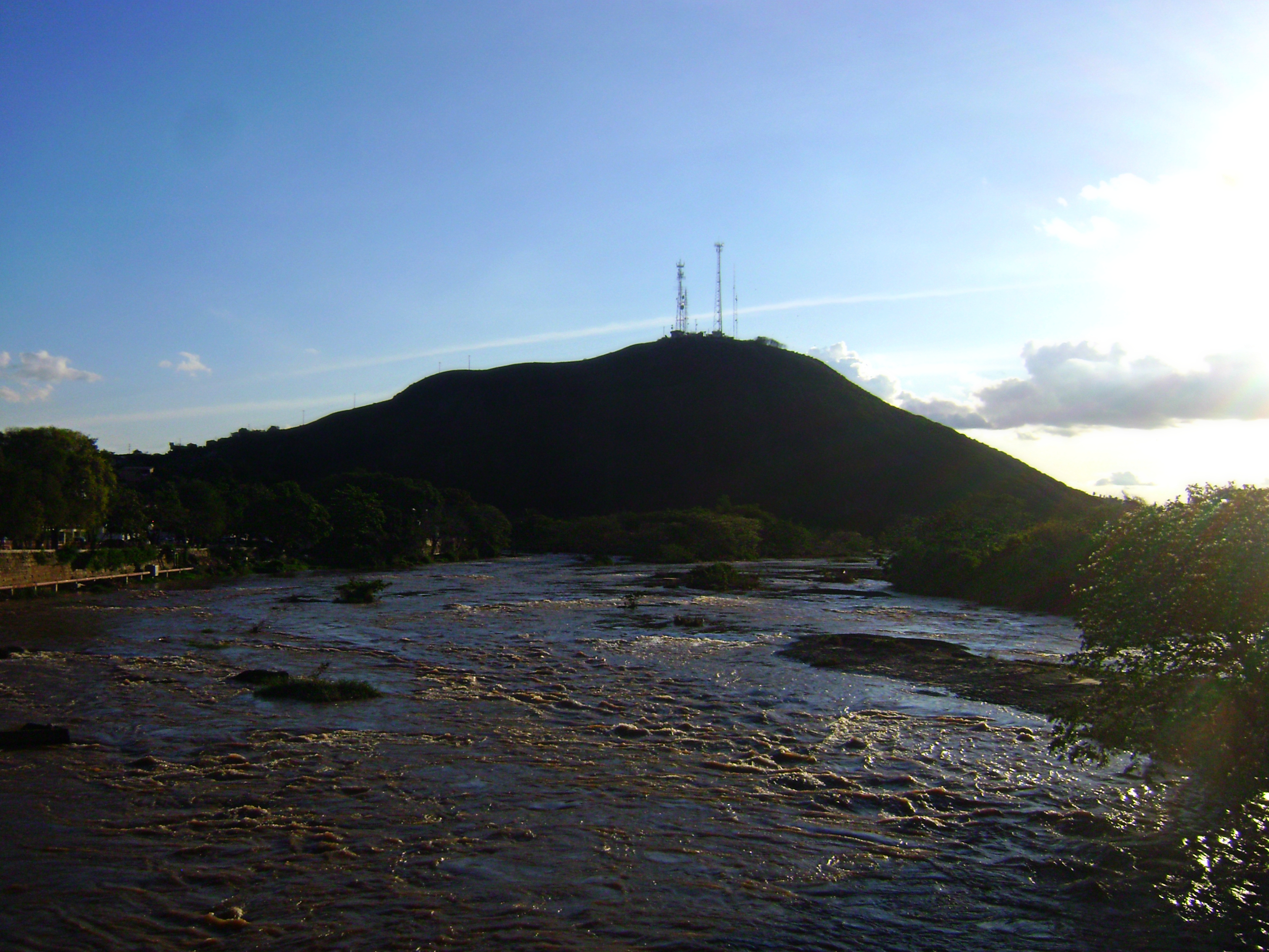

- Location within Brazil

Location
- Country: Brazil

Physical characteristics
- Source
  - location: Minas Gerais state
- Mouth
  - location: Bahia state

The Mucuri River is a river of Bahia and Minas Gerais states in eastern Brazil.

== See also ==
- List of rivers of Bahia
- List of rivers of Minas Gerais
