= Makoní language =

Extinct language of Brazil

Makoní
- Macuní
- Native to: Brazil
- Region: Bahia
- Era: attested 1818
- Language family: Macro-Jê: Maxakalían; Maxakalí group; Makoní

Language codes
- ISO 639-3: None (mis)
- Glottolog: macu1258
- Linguasphere: 89-HAA-ad

Makoní (Maconi, Macuní) is an extinct Maxakalian language of Brazil. It is documented in word lists collected in 1816-1818.

== Distribution ==
Makoní was historically spoken in the Caravelas River area of Bahia, Brazil.

== Vocabulary ==
Makoni	Gloss
potoi	head
tʃoi	teeth
ʃie-tah	breast
kiʃa	heart
küm, kö	blood
tiun-gin	meat
[to-]tʃaⁱ	skin
tatang	father
