= Machacalis =

Coordinates: 17°04′37″S 40°42′57″W

- Municipality
- Location of Machacalis in the state of Minas Gerais, Brazil
- Country: Brazil
- State: Minas Gerais
- Created: 1954
- Elevation: 285 m (935 ft)

Population (2020)
  - Total: 7,111
- Time zone: UTC−3 (BRT)

Machacalis is a Brazilian municipality located in the northeast of the state of Minas Gerais. Its population as of 2020 was 7,111 living in a total area of 329 km^{2} (127 sq mi). The city belongs to the statistical mesoregion of Vale do Mucuri and to the statistical microregion of Nanuque. It became a municipality in 1954.

Machacalis is located at an elevation of 285 metres, 18 kilometres west of the state boundary with Bahia. The nearest major population centre is Teófilo Otoni. The population lived mainly in the rural areas.

The distance to Teófilo Otoni is 210 km; and the distance to the state capital, Belo Horizonte, is 636 km. Neighboring municipalities are: Águas Formosas, Fronteira dos Vales, Santa Helena de Minas, Bertópolis, Umburatiba and Crisólita.

The main economic activities are services, and subsistence agriculture. The GDP in 2005 was R$23 million, with 15 million from services, 1 million from industry, and 5 million from agriculture. There were 308 rural producers on 27,000 hectares of land. Only 11 farms had tractors (2006). 4,000 persons were dependent on agriculture. The main crops were coconuts, sugarcane, beans, and corn. There were 33,000 head of cattle (2006). There was 1 bank (2007) and 270 automobiles (235 motorcycles), giving a ratio of 25 inhabitants per automobile.

The social indicators rank it in the bottom tier of municipalities in the state.

- Municipal Human Development Index: 0.637 (2000)
- State ranking: 772 out of 853 municipalities as of 2000
- National ranking: 3,980 out of 5,138 municipalities as of 2000
- Literacy rate: 72%
- Life expectancy: 63 (average of males and females)

The highest ranking municipality in Minas Gerais in 2000 was Poços de Caldas with 0.841, while the lowest was Setubinha with 0.568. Nationally the highest was São Caetano do Sul in São Paulo with 0.919, while the lowest was Setubinha. In more recent statistics (considering 5,507 municipalities) Manari in the state of Pernambuco has the lowest rating in the country--0,467--putting it in last place.

There were 3 health clinics and 1 hospital with 58 beds (2006). Patients with more serious health conditions are transported to Teófilo Otoni. Educational needs were met by 5 primary schools, 1 middle school, and 2 pre-primary schools.

== See also ==
- List of municipalities in Minas Gerais
