= Umburatiba =

Municipality of Minas Gerais, Brazil

Coordinates: 17°15′21″S 40°34′22″W

- Municipality
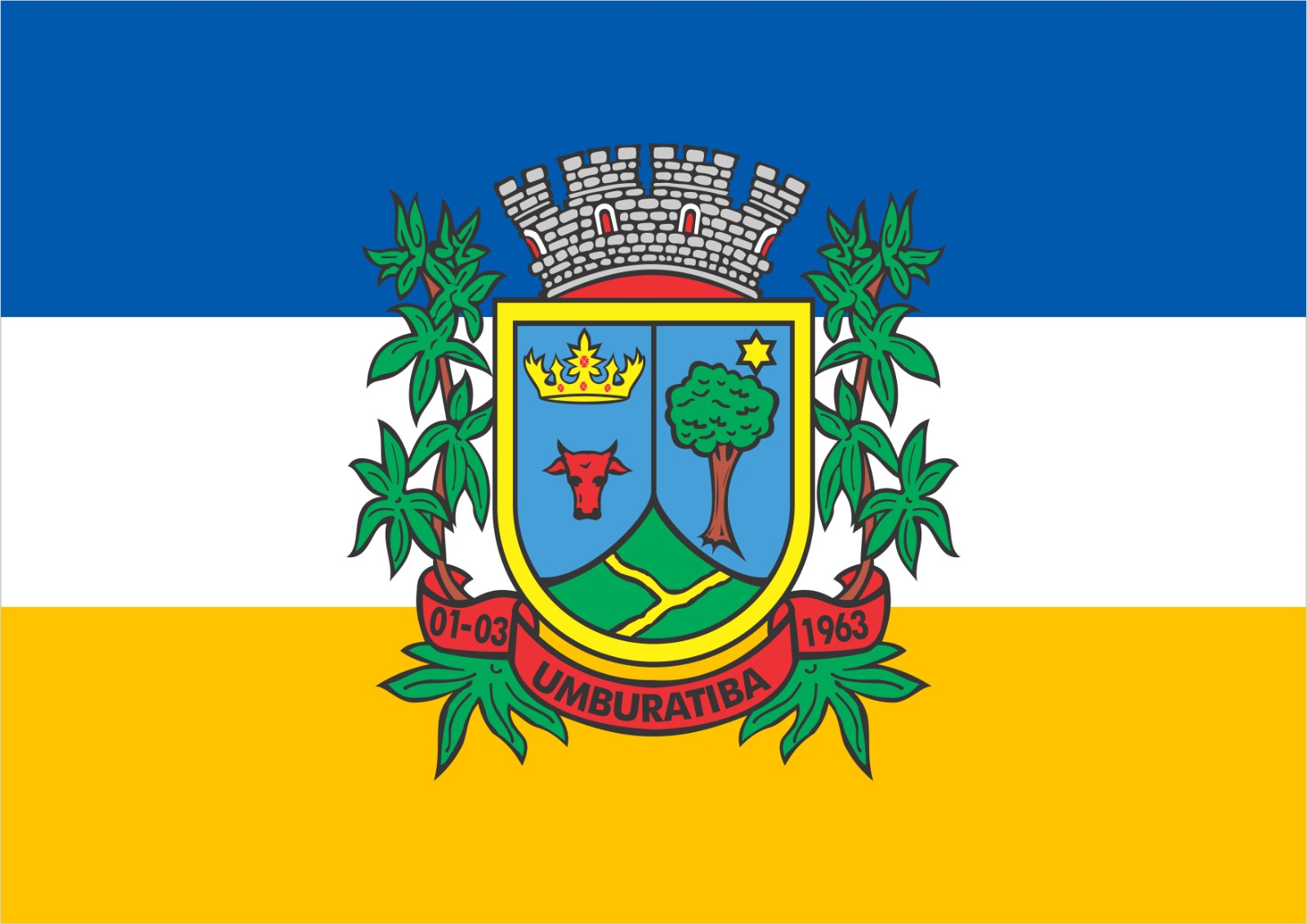
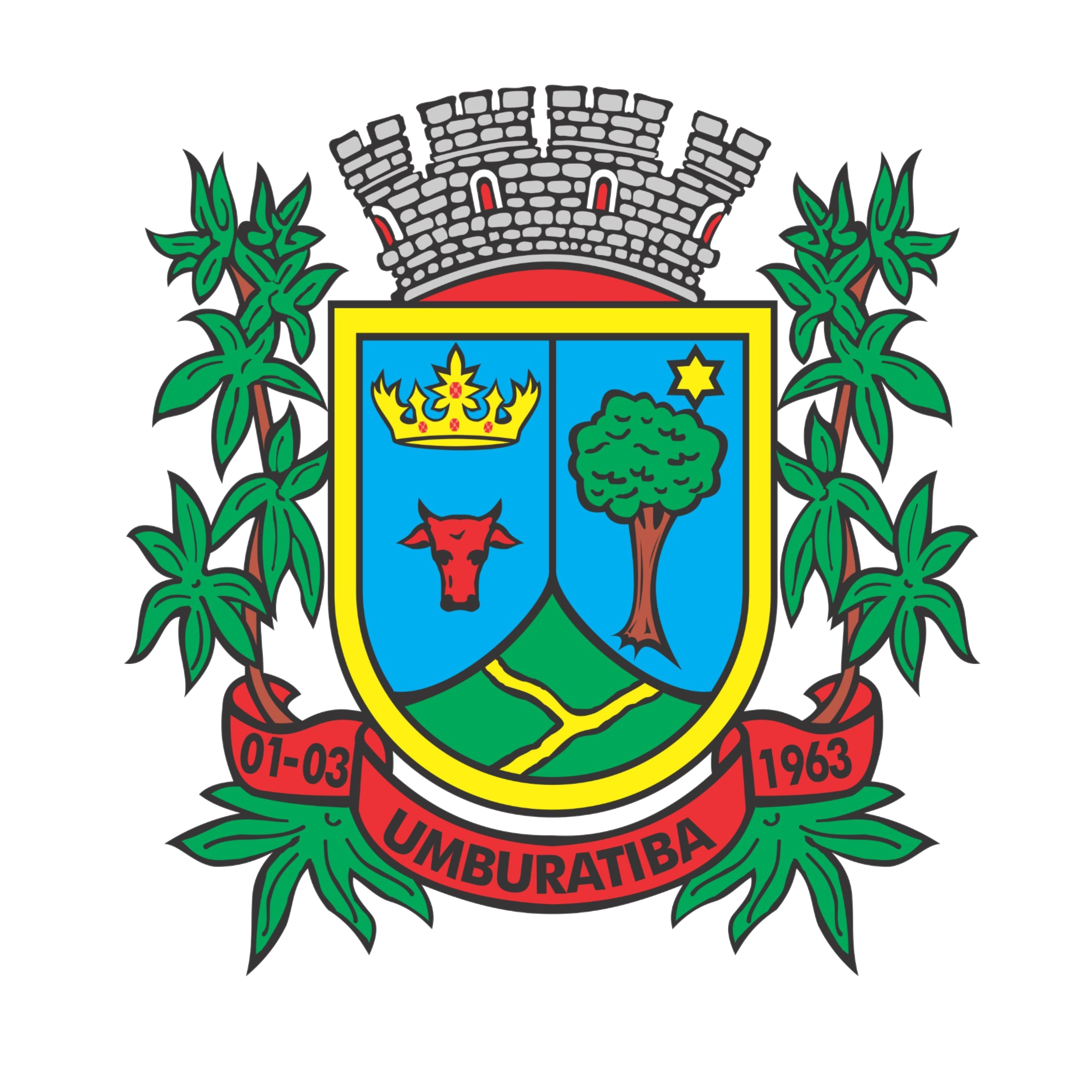
- Flag Coat of arms
- Interactive map of Umburatiba
- Country: Brazil
- State: Minas Gerais
- Region: Southeast
- Time zone: UTC−3 (BRT)

Location of Umburatiba in the state of Minas Gerais, Brazil

Umburatiba is a Brazilian municipality located in the north-east of the state of Minas Gerais. Its population as of 2020 was 2,596 living in a total area of 405 km^{2}. The city belongs to the statistical mesoregion of Vale do Mucuri and to the statistical microregion of Nanuque. It became a municipality in 1962.

== Geography ==
Umburatiba is located at an elevation of 238 meters on the state boundary with Bahia. The nearest major population center is Nanuque.

The distance to Nanuque is 100 km; and the distance to the state capital, Belo Horizonte, is 673 km. Neighboring municipalities are: Machacalis, Bertópolis, Carlos Chagas, Itanhém (Bahia), and Medeiros Neto (Bahia).

== Economy ==
The main economic activities are services, small industries, and subsistence agriculture. The GDP in 2005 was R$12 million, with 7 million from services, 1 million from industry, and 4 million from agriculture. There were 97 rural producers on 65,000 hectares of land. Only 9 farms had tractors (2006). 300 persons were dependent on agriculture. The main crops were coconuts, sugarcane, beans, and corn. There were 29,000 head of cattle (2006). There were no banks (2007) and 60 automobiles (74 motorcycles), giving a ratio of 45 inhabitants per automobile.

== Social indicators ==
The social indicators rank it in the bottom tier of municipalities in the state.

- Municipal Human Development Index: 0.618 (2000)
- State ranking: 810 out of 853 municipalities as of 2000
- National ranking: 4,351 out of 5,138 municipalities as of 2000
- Literacy rate: 71%
- Life expectancy: 60 (average of males and females)
- Degree of urbanization: 55.81 (2000)
- Percentage of urban dwellings connected to sewage system: 70.90
- Infant mortality rate: 18.52

The highest ranking municipality in Minas Gerais in 2000 was Poços de Caldas with 0.841, while the lowest was Setubinha with 0.568. Nationally the highest was São Caetano do Sul in São Paulo with 0.919, while the lowest was Setubinha. In more recent statistics (considering 5,507 municipalities) Manari in the state of Pernambuco has the lowest rating in the country--0,467--putting it in last place.

== Health and education ==
There were 4 health clinics (2 specialized) (2006). Patients with more serious health conditions are transported to Nanuque. Educational needs were met by 3 primary schools, 1 middle school, and 2 pre-primary schools.

== See also ==
- List of municipalities in Minas Gerais
