= Fronteira dos Vales =

Brazilian municipality in Minas Gerais

Coordinates: 16°53′27″S 40°55′30″W

Fronteira dos Vales, Minas Gerais, Brazil
- Municipality
- Município de Fronteira dos Vales; Municipality of Fronteira dos Vales
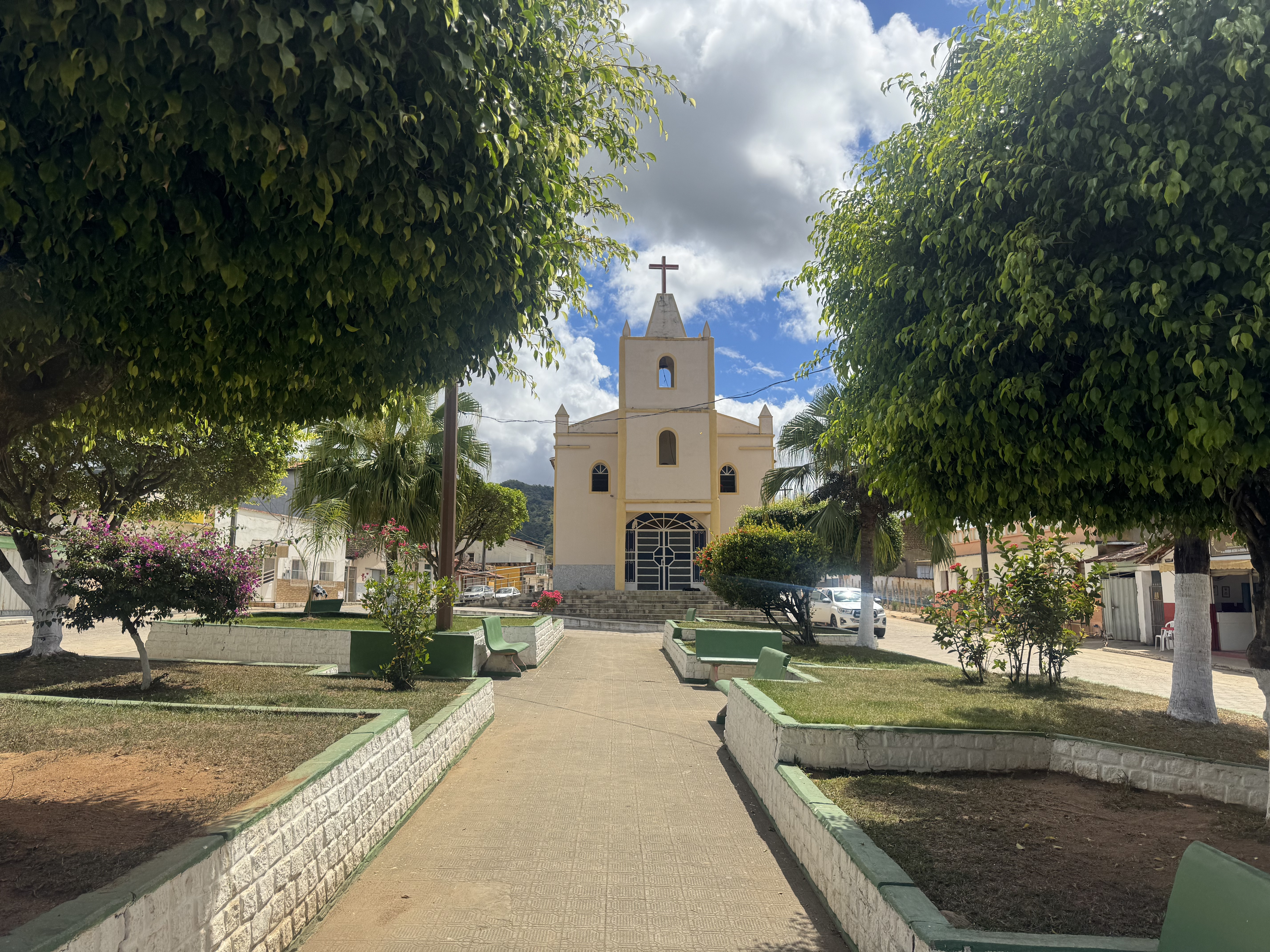

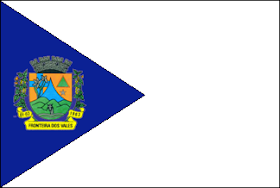
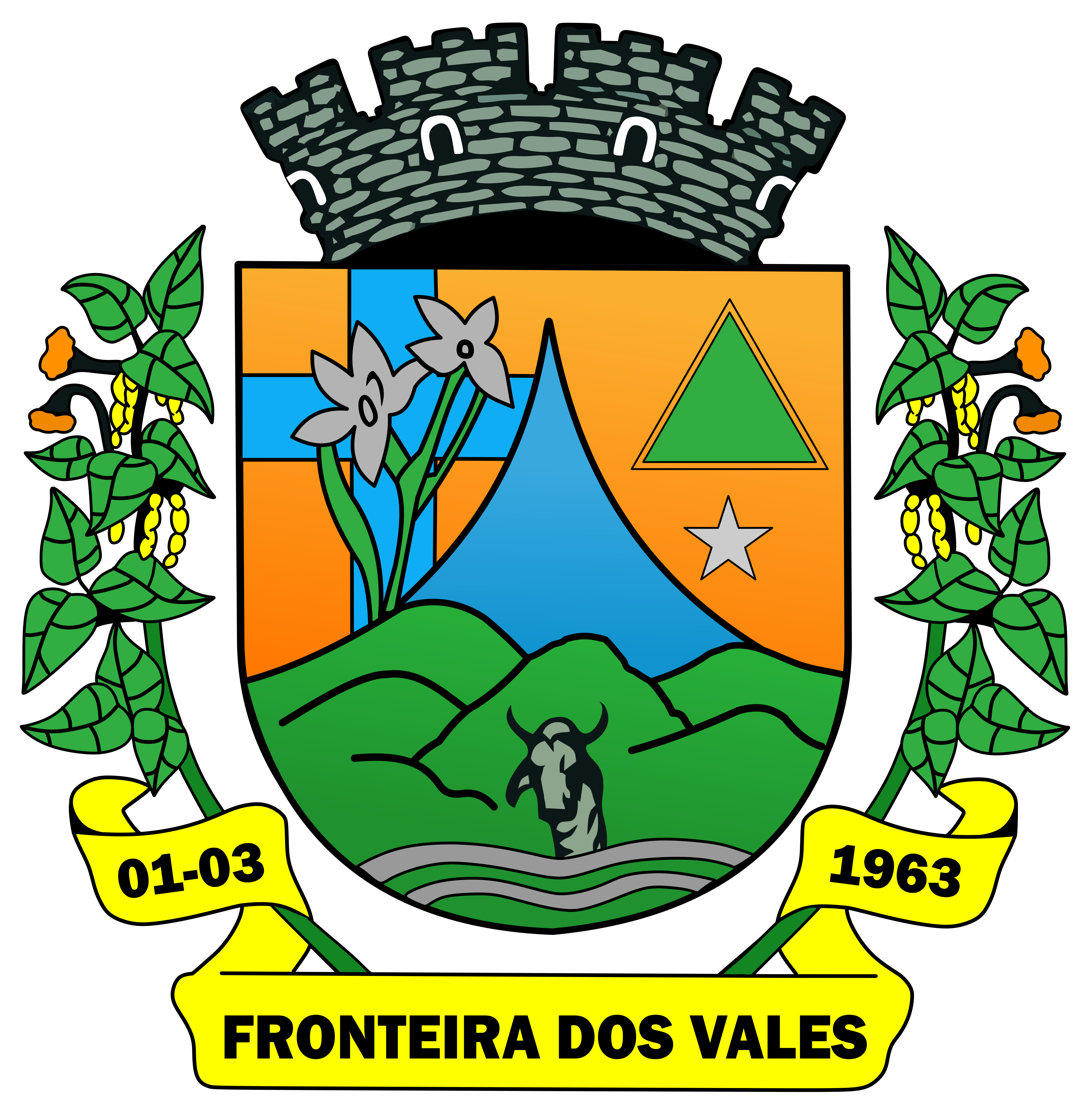
- Flag Coat of arms

- Country: Brazil
- Region: Southeast
- State: Minas Gerais

Area
  - Total: 320,757 km^{2} (123,845 sq mi)

Population
  - Total: 4,345
- Time zone: UTC−3 (BRT)
- Postal Code: 39870-000
- Area code: +55 33

Fronteira dos Vales is a Brazilian municipality located in the north-east of the state of Minas Gerais. Its population as of 2020 was 4,561 living in a total area of 318 km^{2} (123 sq mi). The city belongs to the statistical mesoregion of Vale do Mucuri and to the statistical microregion of Nanuque. It became a municipality in 1963.

== Geography ==
Fronteira dos Vales is located at an elevation of 307 metres (1,007 ft) between the Rio Mucuri and the Rio Pampã. The nearest major population centre is Teófilo Otoni. The name came about because of the position between the two river valleys.

The distance to Teófilo Otoni is 182 kilometres (113 mi); and the distance to the state capital, Belo Horizonte, is 725 kilometres (450 mi). Neighboring municipalities are: Santa Helena de Minas, Águas Formosas, Machacalis and Joaíma.

== Economy ==
The main economic activities are services, and subsistence agriculture. The GDP in 2005 was R$12 million, with 9 million from services, 1 million from industry, and 2 million from agriculture. There were 455 rural producers on 21,000 hectares (52,000 acres) of land. As of 2006, only five farms had tractors. A thousand persons were dependent on agriculture. The main crops were coconuts, sugarcane, beans, and corn. There were 16,000 head of cattle (2006). There were no banks (2007) and 65 automobiles (98 motorcycles), giving a ratio of 75 inhabitants per automobile.

== Social indicators ==
The social indicators rank it in the bottom tier of municipalities in the state.

- Municipal Human Development Index: 0.599 (2000)
- State ranking: 835 out of 853 municipalities as of 2000
- National ranking: 4,675 out of 5,138 municipalities as of 2000
- Literacy rate: 59%
- Life expectancy: 67 (average of males and females)

The highest ranking municipality in Minas Gerais in 2000 was Poços de Caldas with 0.841, while the lowest was Setubinha with 0.568. Nationally the highest was São Caetano do Sul in São Paulo with 0.919, while the lowest was Setubinha. In more recent statistics (considering 5,507 municipalities) Manari in the state of Pernambuco has the lowest rating in the country—0,467—putting it in last place.

== Health and education ==
There were six health clinics and no hospitals in 2006. Patients with more serious health conditions are transported to Teófilo Otoni. Educational needs were met by six primary schools, a middle school, and a pre-primary school.

== See also ==
- List of municipalities in Minas Gerais
