= Serra dos Aimorés, Minas Gerais =

Brazilian municipality in the north-east of the state of Minas Gerais

Coordinates: 17°46′58″S 40°14′52″W

Serra dos Aimorés
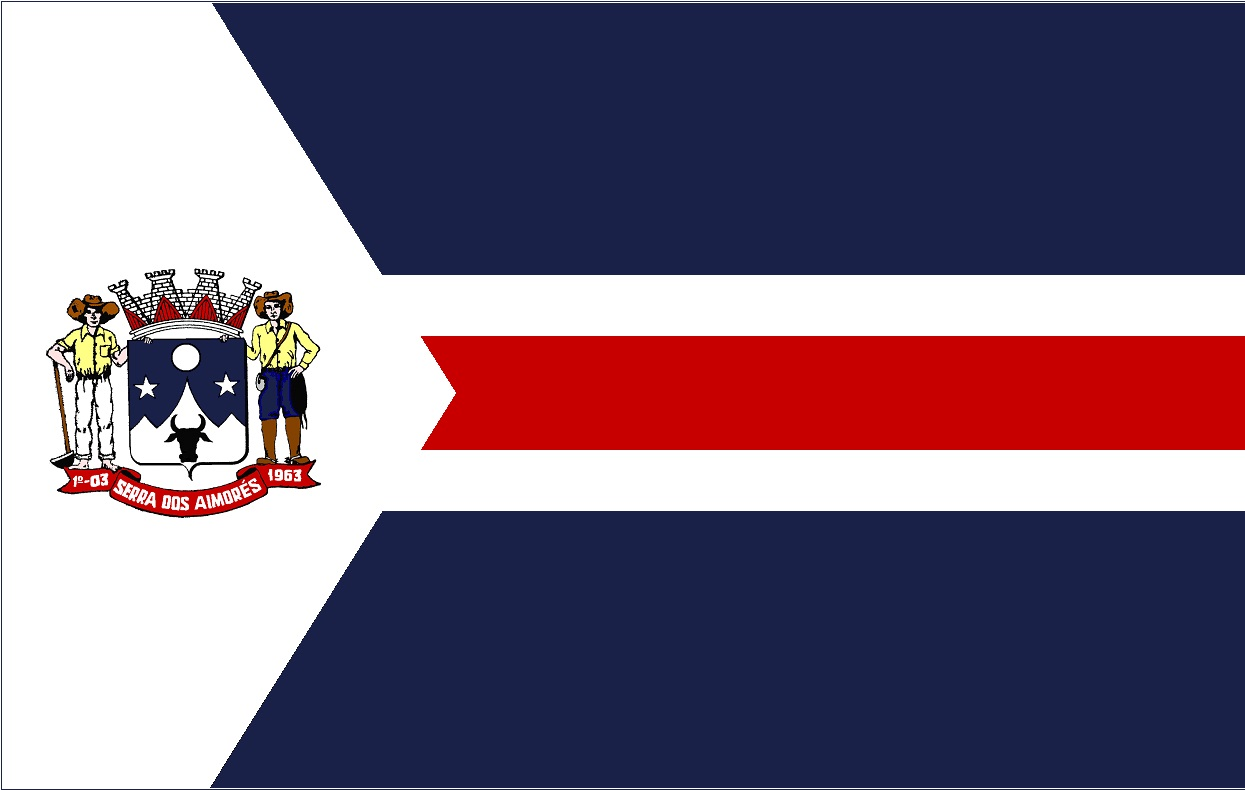
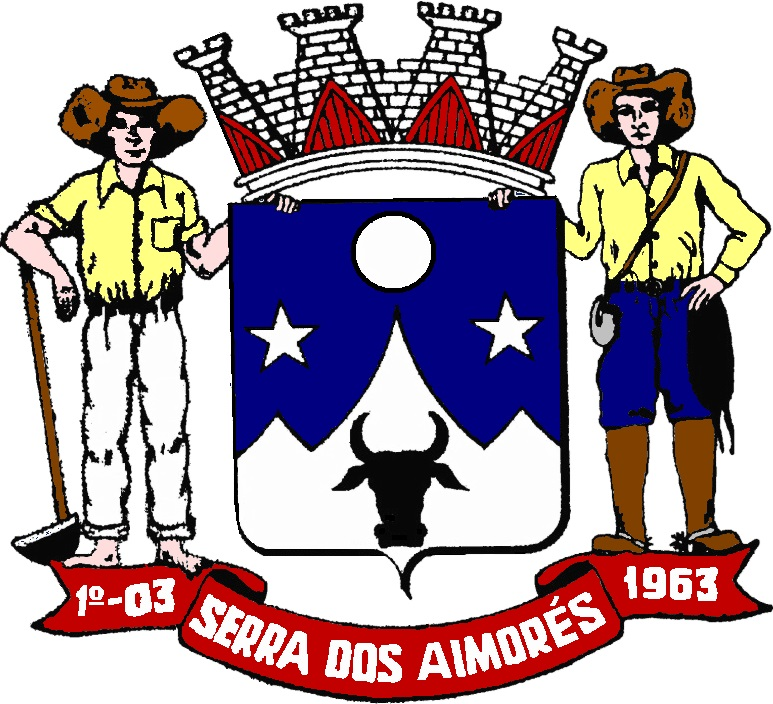
- Flag Coat of arms

- Country: Brazil
- Region: Southeast
- State: Minas Gerais
- Intermediate Geographic Region: Teófilo Otoni
- Immediate Geographic Region: Teófilo Otoni

Area
  - Total: 213.574 km^{2} (82.461 sq mi)

Population (2022)
  - Total: 6,944
  - Density: 32.51/km^{2} (84.2/sq mi)
- Time zone: UTC−3 (BRT)
- Website: pmsa.mg.gov.br

Serra dos Aimorés is a Brazilian municipality located in the north-east of the state of Minas Gerais, at its namesake, the Serra dos Aimorés. Its population as of 2020 was 8,713 living in a total area of 215 km^{2}. The city belongs to the statistical mesoregion of Vale do Mucuri and to the statistical microregion of Nanuque. It became a municipality in 1962. Before this time, it was a disputed region between the states of Minas Gerais and Espírito Santo.

== Geography ==
Serra dos Aimorés is located at an elevation of 209 meters on the state boundary with Bahia. The nearest major population center is Nanuque. Most of the population lives in the urban area.

The distance to Nanuque is 25 km; and the distance to the state capital, Belo Horizonte, is 616 km. Neighboring municipalities are: Nanuque, Ibirapuã (Bahia), and Ibiranhém, (Bahia).

== Economy ==
The main economic activities are services, small industries, and subsistence agriculture. The GDP in 2005 was R$44 million (US$18.07 million), with 20 million from services, 13 million from industry, and 6 million from agriculture. There were 146 rural producers on 12,000 hectares of land. Only 11 farms had tractors (2006). 800 persons were dependent on agriculture. The main crops were coconuts, sugarcane, beans, and corn. There were 26,000 head of cattle (2006). There was 1 bank (2007) and 382 automobiles (203 motorcycles), giving a ratio of 20 inhabitants per automobile.

== Social indicators ==
The social indicators rank it in the bottom tier of municipalities in the state.

- Municipal Human Development Index: 0.655 (2000)
- State ranking: 731 out of 853 municipalities as of 2000
- National ranking: 3,699 out of 5,138 municipalities as of 2000
- Literacy rate: 74%
- Life expectancy: 62 (average of males and females)

In terms of HDI, the highest ranking municipality in Minas Gerais in 2000 was Poços de Caldas with 0.841, while the lowest was Setubinha with 0.568. Nationally the highest was São Caetano do Sul in São Paulo with 0.919, while the lowest was Setubinha. In more recent statistics (considering 5,507 municipalities) Manari in the state of Pernambuco has the lowest rating in the country—0,467—putting it in last place.

== Health and education ==
There were 6 health clinics (2 specialized) (2006). Patients with more serious health conditions are transported to Nanuque. Educational needs were met by 10 primary schools, 1 middle school, and 5 pre-primary schools.

== See also ==
- List of municipalities in Minas Gerais
