= Águas Formosas =

Brazilian municipality located in the north-east of the state of Minas Gerais

Coordinates: 17°04′55″S 40°56′09″W

- Municipality
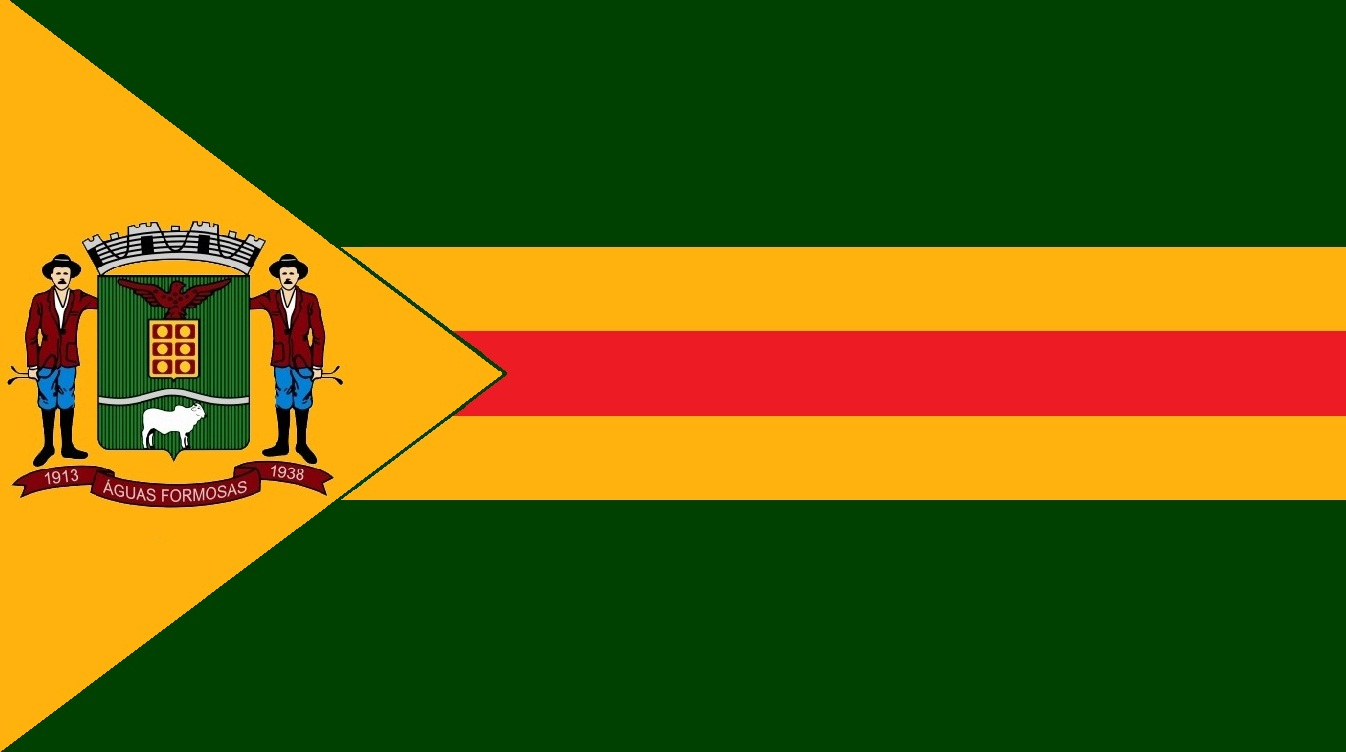
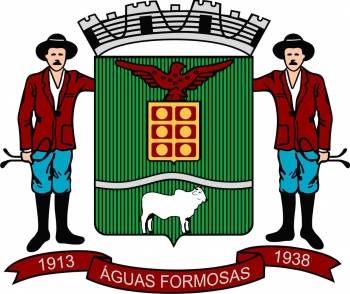
- Flag Coat of arms
- Interactive map of Águas Formosas
- Country: Brazil
- State: Minas Gerais
- Region: Southeast
- Time zone: UTC−3 (BRT)

Location of Águas Formosas in the state of Minas Gerais, Brazil

Águas Formosas is a Brazilian municipality located in the north-east of the state of Minas Gerais. Its population as of 2020 was 19,247 living in a total area of 817 km^{2}. The city belongs to the statistical mesoregion of Vale do Mucuri and to the statistical microregion of Nanuque. It became a municipality in 1938.

== Geography ==
Águas Formosas is located at an elevation of 273 meters in the Rio Pampã valley. It is east of the important federal highway BR-116 to which it is connected by state highways MG-105 and 409. The nearest major population center is Teófilo Otoni.

The distance to Teófilo Otoni is 158 km; and the distance to state capital Belo Horizonte is 613 km. Neighboring municipalities are: Fronteira dos Vales (N); Machacalis (E); Crisólita (S); and Novo Oriente de Minas (W).

== Economy ==
The main economic activities are services, and agriculture. The GDP in 2005 was R$60 million, with 41 million from services, 6 million from industry, and 9 million from agriculture. There were 866 rural producers on 57,000 hectares of land. Only 17 farms had tractors (2006). 2,500 persons were dependent on agriculture. The main crops were sugarcane, beans, and corn. There were 55,000 head of cattle (2006). There were 2 banks (2007) and 681 automobiles (508 motorcycles), giving a ratio of 28 inhabitants per automobile.

== Municipal social indicators ==
The social indicators rank it in the bottom tier of municipalities in the state.

- Municipal Human Development Index: 0.639 (2000)
- State ranking: 770 out of 853 municipalities as of 2000
- National ranking: 3,948 out of 5,138 municipalities as of 2000
- Literacy rate: 68%
- Life expectancy: 63 (average of males and females)

The highest ranking municipality in Minas Gerais in 2000 was Poços de Caldas with 0.841, while the lowest was Setubinha with 0.568. Nationally the highest was São Caetano do Sul in São Paulo with 0.919, while the lowest was Setubinha. In more recent statistics (considering 5,507 municipalities) Manari in the state of Pernambuco has the lowest rating in the country--0,467--putting it in last place.

== Health and education ==
There were 6 health clinics and one private hospital with 87 beds in 2005. Patients with more serious health conditions are transported to Teófilo Otoni. Educational needs were met by 31 primary schools, 2 middle schools, and 5 pre-primary schools.

== See also ==
- List of municipalities in Minas Gerais
