= Aimoré =

Indigenous people of Brazil

Aimoré Botocudo
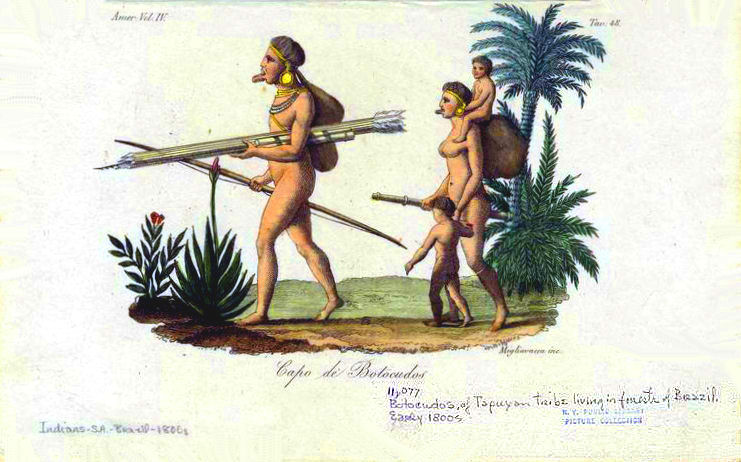
- Illustration of Botocudos, wearing tembeiteras or lower lip disks

Total population
- 350 (2010)

Regions with significant populations
- Brazil (Mato Grosso, Minas Gerais, São Paulo)

Languages
- Krenak

Religion
- Animism

The Aimoré (Aymore, Aimboré) are one of several South American peoples of eastern Brazil called Botocudo in Portuguese (from botoque, a plug), in allusion to the wooden disks or tembetás worn in their lips and ears. Some called themselves Nac-nanuk or Nac-poruk, meaning "sons of the soil". The last Aimoré group to retain their language is the Krenak. The other peoples called Botocudo were the Xokleng and Xeta.

The Brazilian chief who was presented to King Henry VIII in 1532 wore small bones hung from his cheeks and from the lower lip a semi-precious stone the size of a pea. These were the marks of great bravery. When the Portuguese adventurer Vasco Fernando Coutinho reached the east coast of Brazil in 1535, he erected a fort at the head of Espírito Santo Bay to defend himself against the Aimorés and other tribes.

== Etymology ==
The name "Krenak" comes from kren 'head' and nak 'land'.

== Distribution and fate ==
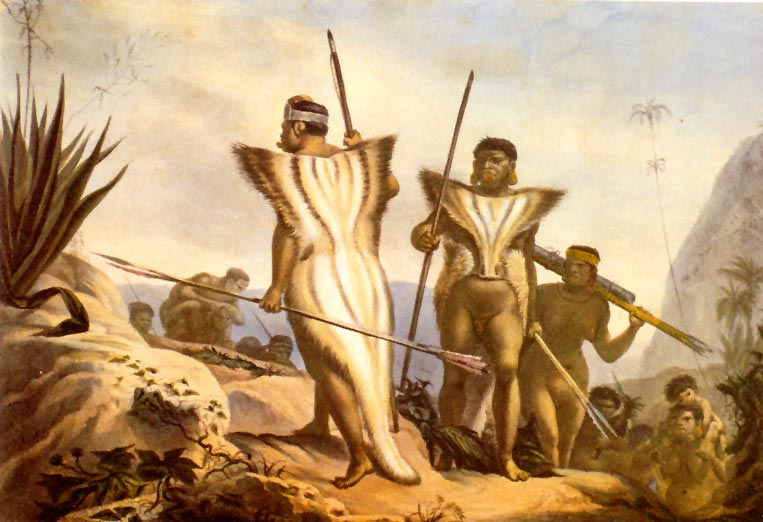
Botocudos by Debret

The tribe's original territory was in Espírito Santo, and reached inland to the headwaters of the Rio Grande (Belmonte) and Doce River on the eastern slopes of the Espinhaço Mountains. The Botocudos were gradually expelled by European colonists westward beyond the Serra dos Aimorés into Minas Gerais. It was in the latter district that at the close of the 18th century they came into collision with the Europeans, who were attracted there by the diamond fields.

Persecution against the Aimorés would begin early in colonization, with the Aimoré War beginning in 1555, when the Aimorés responded against widespread slavery of their peoples. At the end of the 19th century many Botocudo tribes still existed, numbering between 13,000 and 14,000 individuals. During the earlier frontier wars of 1790–1820, every effort was made to destroy them. Smallpox was deliberately spread among them; poisoned food was scattered in the forests; by such infamous means, the coast districts about Rio Doce and Belmonte were cleared, and one Portuguese commander boasted that he had either slain with his own hands or ordered to be butchered many hundreds of them.

Paul Ehrenreich estimated their population at 5,000 in 1884. As of April 1939, only 68 Botocudo were alive in Eastern Brazil. They were divided into two groups. The first group numbered 10 people (belonging to Naknyanuk, Arana and Poyica tribes) and lived near Itambacuri. The second group were divided into two bands residing at Guido Marliere, on the Doce River. One band consisted of 8 survivors from the Naktun, Nakpie, Convugn and Miyã-Yirúgn tribes. Another band consisted of around 50 Nakrehe.

Today, only a few tribes remain, almost all of them in rural villages and the indigenous territory. The last remnants of the Eastern Botocudo are the Krenak. In 2010, there were 350 Krenak living in the state of Minas Gerais.

== Subdivisions ==
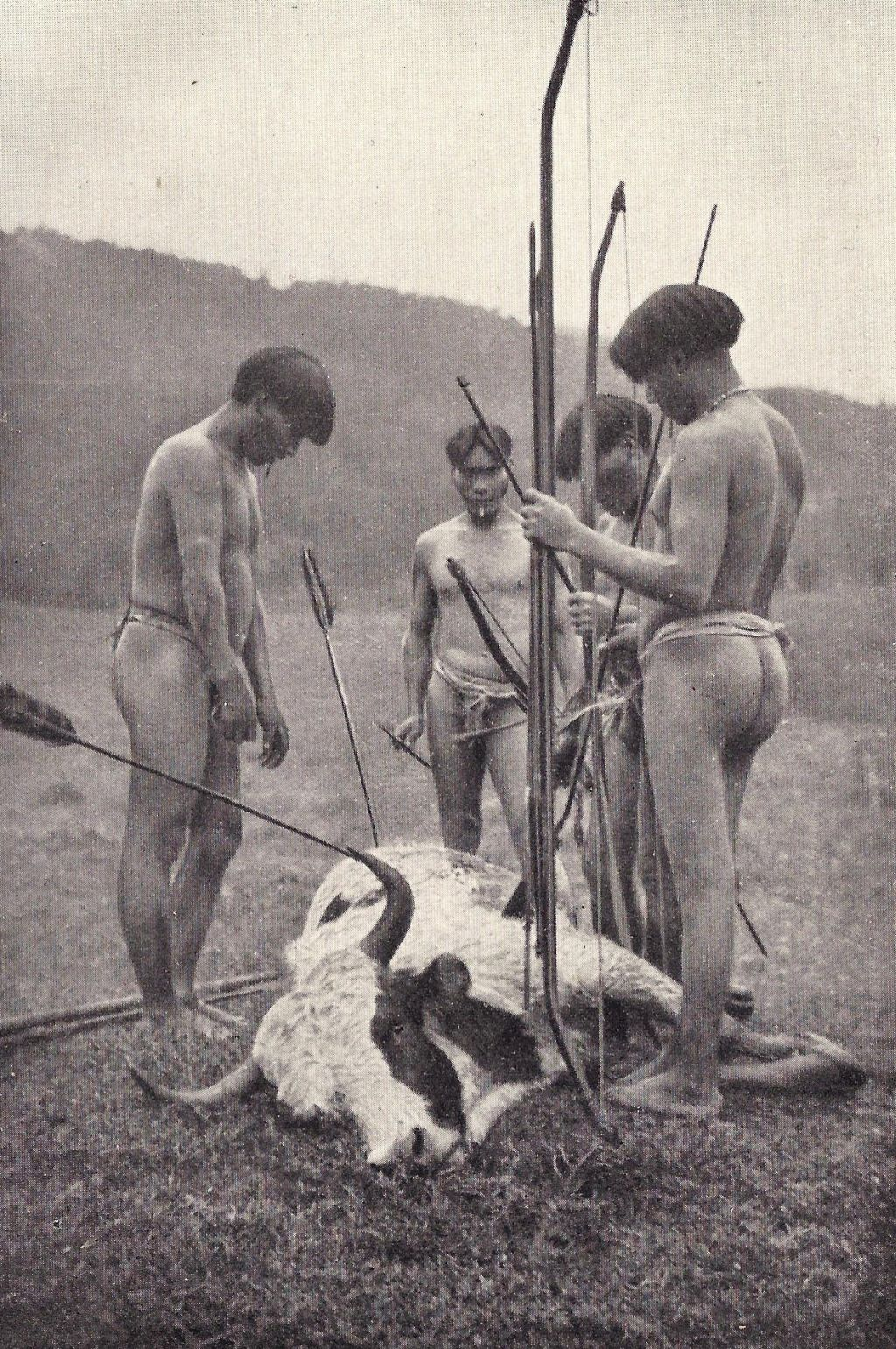
Botocuden hunters (1928)

The Aimoré consisted of dozens of tribes, who spoke either dialects or closely related languages. Some of the important tribes are:

- Prajé or Pragé - Pernambuco
- Takruk-krak or Takrukrak
- Crecmum or Krekmún - Bahia
- Etwét or Ituêto - Minas Gerais
- Futi-krak
- Gerén or Gueren - Bahia
- Gut-Craque or Gutucrac - Minas Gerais
- Mekmek - Minas Gerais
- Minyã Yirúgn or Minhagirun
- Minhagiran - Espírito Santo
- Nakrehê or Naque Erehê / Nacrehe - Minas Gerais & Espirito Santo
- Naque-namu
- Naque-Nhepe
- Naknianuk or Naknyanúk / Nacnhanuc - Minas Gerais

== Customs ==
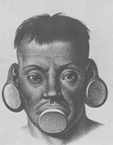
Botocudo man, drawn by Johann Moritz Rugendas

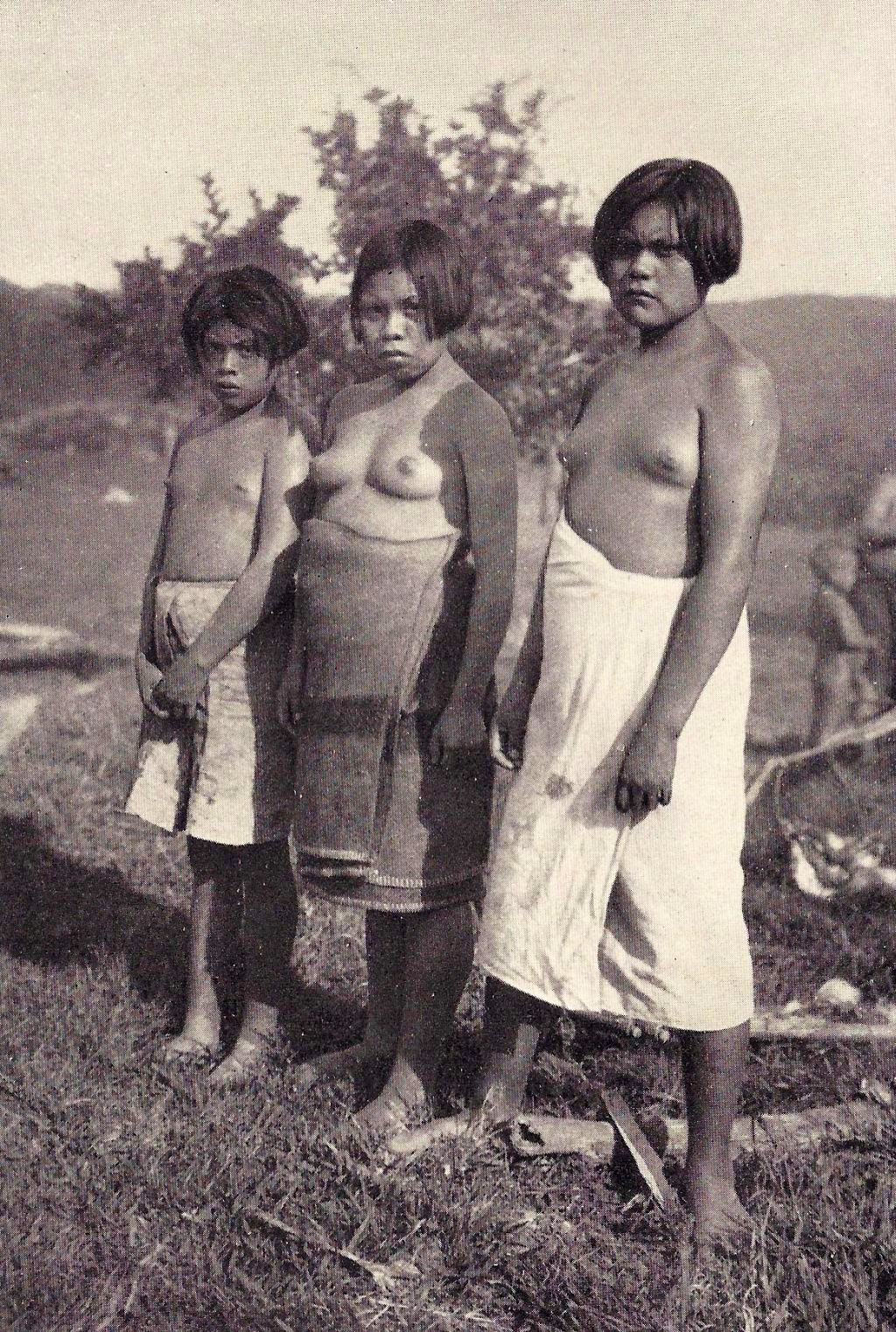
Botocuden girls (1928)

The Botocudos were a nomadic hunter-gatherers peoples living in the forest. Their implements and domestic utensils were all of wood; their only weapons were reed spears and bows and arrows. Their dwellings were rough shelters of leaf and bast, seldom 4 feet (1.2 m) high. Their only musical instrument was a small bamboo nose flute. They attributed all the blessings of life to the Day Fire (Sun) and all evil to Night Fire (Moon). At the graves of the dead, they kept fires burning for some days to scare away evil spirits, and, during storms and eclipses, arrows were shot into the sky to drive away demons.

The most conspicuous feature of the Botocudos was the tembeitera, a wooden plug or disk which is worn in the lower lip and the lobe of the ear. This disk, made of the especially light and carefully dried wood of the barriguda tree (Chorisia ventricosa), which the natives called embur, whence Augustin Saint-Hilaire suggested as the probable derivation of their name, Aimboré. It is worn only in the under-lip, now chiefly by women, but formerly by men also. The operation for preparing the lip begins often as early as the eighth year, when an initial boring is made by a hard pointed stick, and gradually extended by the insertion of larger and larger disks or plugs, sometimes at last as much as 10 cm in diameter. Despite the lightness of the wood, the tembeitera weighs down the lip, which at first sticks out horizontally and at last becomes a mere ring of skin around the wood. Ear plugs are also worn, of such size as to distend the lobe down to the shoulders. Similar ear ornaments are common in South and even Central America, at least as far north as Honduras, as described by Christopher Columbus when he explored this latter country during his fourth voyage (1502). This ornament also named part of the Peru seaboard as Costa de la Oreja, from the conspicuously distended ears of the native Chimú. Early Spanish explorers also gave the name Orejones or big-eared to several Amazon tribes.

== See also ==
- Indigenous peoples in Brazil
- History of Brazil
- Luzia

== Sources ==
- P. M. A. Ehrenreich. "Ueber die Botocudos." Zeitschrift für Ethnologie 19: 49–82. 1887.
- Charles C. Mann. 1491, Vintage Books, a division of Random House, New York, 2005. pg. 152–154.
- A. Metraux. "The Botocudo." Bulletin of the Bureau of American Ethnology 143: i, 531–540. 1946.
- Hal Langfur, "The Forbidden Lands: Colonial Identity, Frontier Violence, and the Persistence of Brazil's Eastern Indians", 1750-1830 Hardcover July 28, 2006
