= Barriguda tree =

Barriguda tree is a common name for several plants and may refer to:

- Acrocomia intumescens
- Cavanillesia arborea
- Species in the genus Ceiba, specifically
  - Ceiba speciosa, native to South America
  - Ceiba ventricosa, native to Brazil
- Iriartea ventricosa
