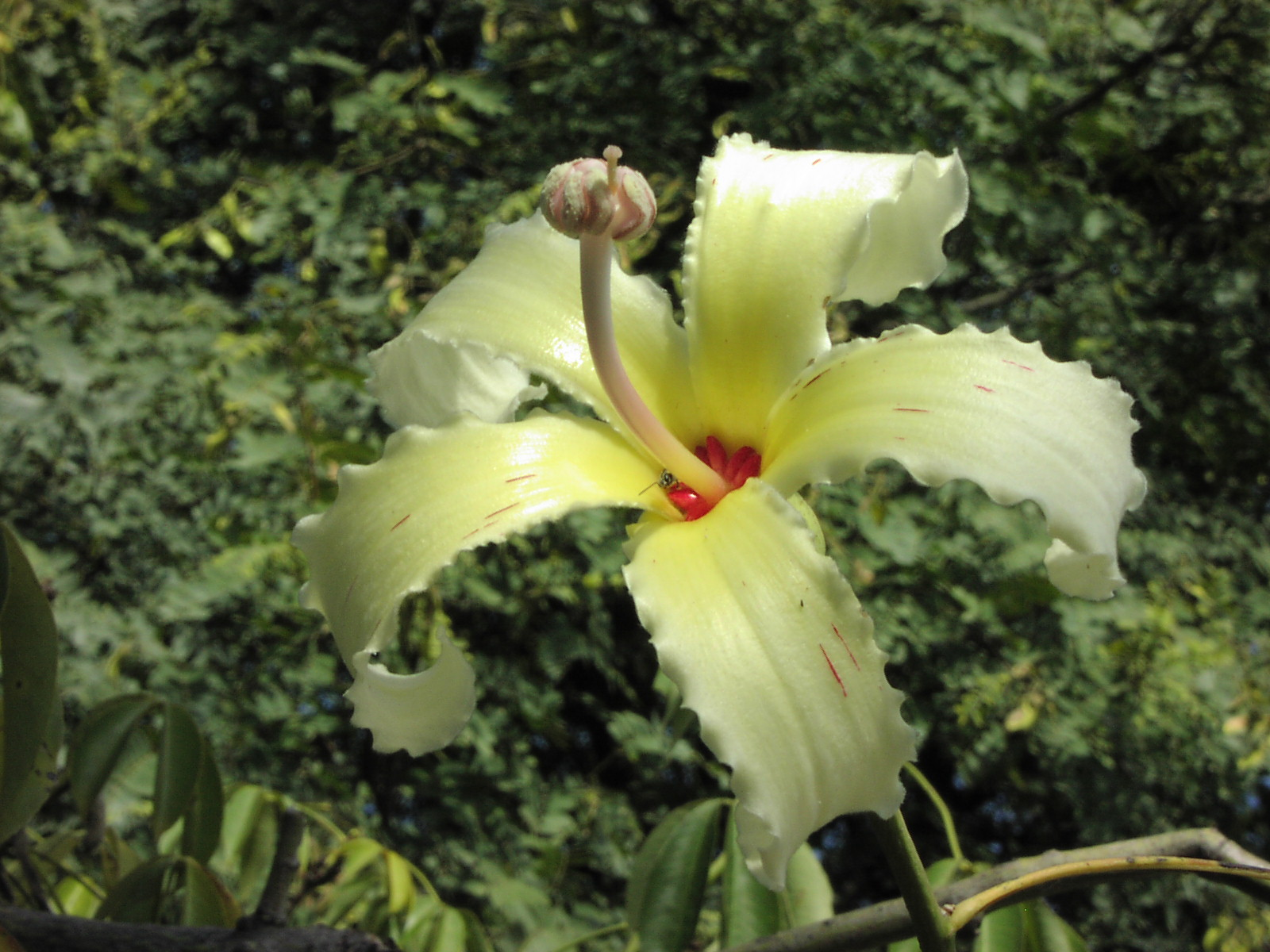

Scientific classification
- Kingdom: Plantae
- Clade: Tracheophytes
- Clade: Angiosperms
- Clade: Eudicots
- Clade: Rosids
- Order: Malvales
- Family: Malvaceae
- Genus: Ceiba
- Species: C. ventricosa

Binomial name
- Ceiba ventricosa (Nees & Mart.) Ravenna

Synonyms
- Bombax ventricosum Arruda; Ceiba incana (A.Robyns) Ravenna; Chorisia incana A.Robyns; Chorisia ventricosa Arruda; Chorisia ventricosa Arruda ex Nees & Mart.

= Ceiba ventricosa =

Species of tree

Ceiba ventricosa, known as the barriguda tree, is a species of tree in the Malvaceae family. It is a tropical and evergreen species native to the Atlantic rainforests of Brazil. It can reach a height of 26 meters, and the bole can grow to a diameter of 60 centimeters. The species was described by Pedro Felix Ravenna in 1998.

== Uses ==
The timber is harvested, but is of low quality. The wood is used by the Aimoré people of Brazil as a wooden plug or disk which is worn in the lower lip and the lobe of the ear.
