= Santa Helena de Minas =

Municipality in the northeast of the Brazilian state of Minas Gerais

Coordinates: 16°58′58″S 40°41′09″W

- Municipality
- Interactive map of Santa Helena de Minas
- Country: Brazil
- State: Minas Gerais
- Region: Southeast
- Time zone: UTC−3 (BRT)

Location of Santa Helena de Minas in the state of Minas Gerais

Santa Helena de Minas is a municipality in the northeast of the Brazilian state of Minas Gerais. As of 2020 the population was 6,386 in a total area of 277 square kilometres (107 sq mi). The elevation is 312 metres (1,024 ft). It became a municipality in 1997.

Santa Helena de Minas is part of the statistical microregion of Nanuque.

This is one of the poorest municipalities in the state and in the country. The main economic activities are cattle raising (7,000 head in 2006) and farming with modest production of bananas, coffee, and corn. In 2006 there were 289 rural producers with a total area of 25,033 hectares (61,860 acres). Cropland made up 3,600 hectares (8,900 acres). There were only three tractors. In the urban area there were no financial institutions as of 2006. There were 90 automobiles, giving a ratio of about one automobile for every 65 inhabitants. Health care was provided by four public health clinics. There were no hospitals.

== Municipal Human Development Index ==
- MHDI: .594 (2000)
- State ranking: 842 out of 853 municipalities as of 2000
- National ranking: 4,771 out of 5,138 municipalities as of 2000
- Life expectancy: 62
- Literacy rate: 62
- Combined primary, secondary and tertiary gross enrolment ratio: .693
- Per capita income (monthly): R$83.33

Note that at last count Brazil had 5,561 municipalities while Minas Gerais still had 853.

The above figures can be compared with those of Poços de Caldas, which had an MHDI of .841, the highest in the state of Minas Gerais. The highest MHDI in the country (2000) was São Caetano do Sul in the state of São Paulo with an MHDI of .919. More up-to-date data from 2004 show that the lowest in that year was Manari in the state of Pernambuco with an MHDI of .467 out of a total of 5504 municipalities in the country as of 2004. At last count Brazil had 5,561 municipalities so this might have changed at the time of this writing.

== See also ==
- List of municipalities in Minas Gerais
