= Bertópolis =

Municipality in the northeast of the Brazilian state of Minas Gerais

Coordinates: 17°03′49″S 40°34′14″W

- Municipality
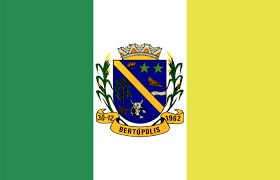
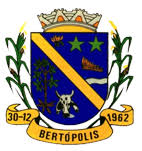
- Flag Coat of arms

- Country: Brazil
- State: Minas Gerais

Bertópolis is a municipality in the northeast of the Brazilian state of Minas Gerais. As of 2020 the population was 4,607 in a total area of 426 km^{2} (164 sq mi). The elevation is 278 meters. It became a municipality in 1962. The postal code (CEP) is 39875-000.

== Geography ==
Bertópolis is part of the statistical microregion of Nanuque. It lies on the boundary with the south of the state of Bahia. It is connected by poor roads to the important highway BR-116, which lies to the west. The distance is 108 kilometers.

== Economy ==
The main economic activities are cattle raising (31,000 head in 2006) and farming with production of coconut, sugarcane, bananas, coffee, dairy products and oranges. In 2006 there were 290 rural producers with a total agricultural area of 40,196 hectares. Cropland made up 3,800 hectares. There were only 5 tractors. In the urban area there were no financial institutions as of 2006. There were 70 automobiles, giving a ratio of about one automobile for every 60 inhabitants. Health care was provided by 4 public health clinics. There were no hospitals. The mayor is Lauro Alves Jardim, he is currently in his second term.

== Municipal social indicators ==
Municipal Human Development Index

- MHDI: .585 (2000)
- State ranking: 846 out of 853 municipalities
- National ranking: 4,908 out of 5,138 municipalities
- Life expectancy: 60
- Literacy rate: 64
- Combined primary, secondary and tertiary gross enrolment ratio: .652
- Per capita income (monthly): R$89.75 For the complete list see Frigoletto

== See also ==
- List of municipalities in Minas Gerais
