= Serra dos Aimorés =

Mountain in Brazil

Coordinates: 19°00′S 41°00′W

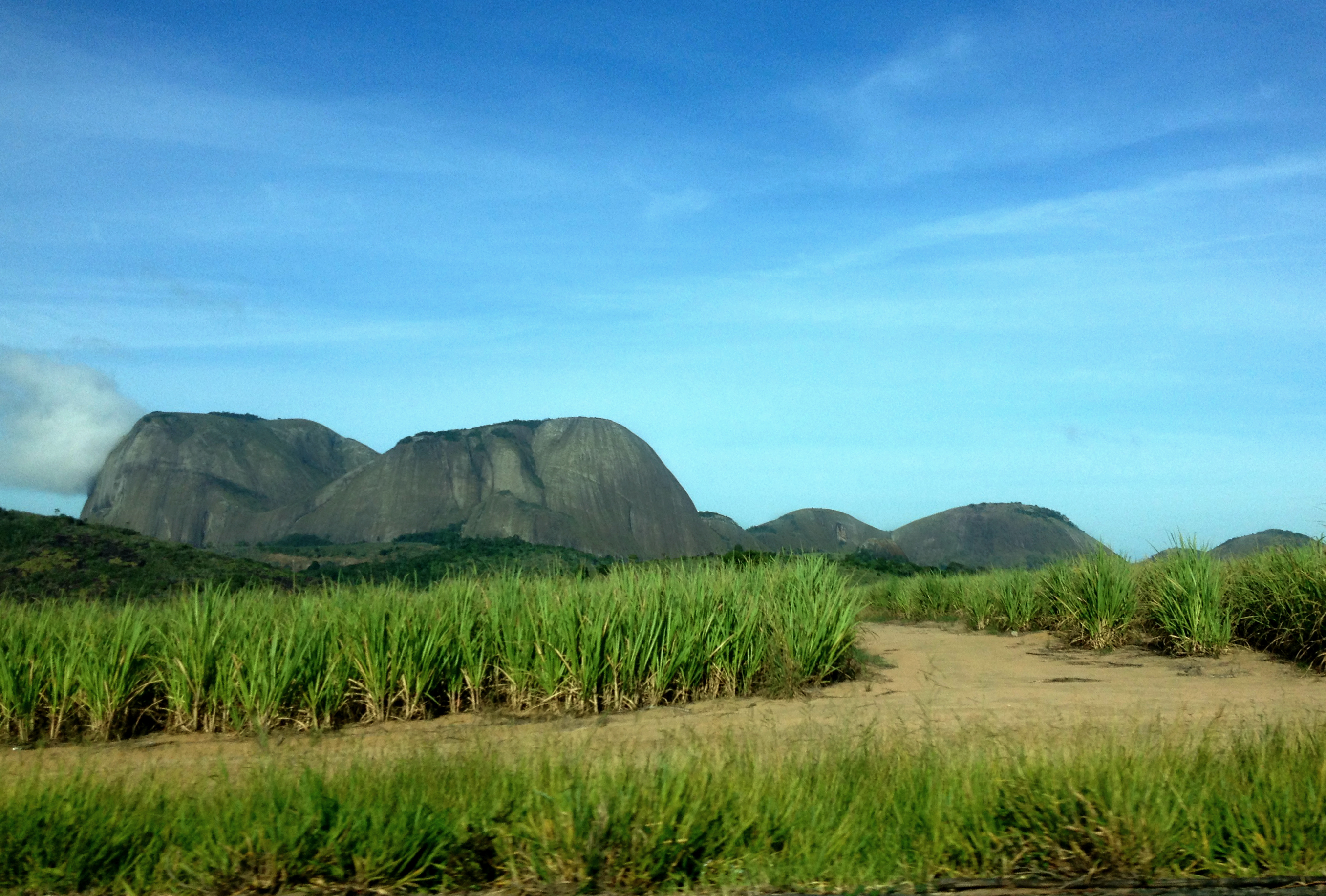
Serra dos Aimorés seen from Nanuque, Minas Gerais

Serra dos Aimorés ("Botocudo mountain") is a mountainous area in eastern Brazil straddling the border between Espírito Santo and Minas Gerais, in the latter state's northeast. Its name derives from the Aimoré, an indigenous people who used to inhabit the area.
