= Vale do Mucuri (mesoregion) =

- Mesoregion
- Location within Minas Gerais
- Coordinates: 17°51′28″S 41°30′18″W
- Country: Brazil
- Region: Southeast
- State: Minas Gerais

Area
  - Total: 20,080.657 km^{2} (7,753.185 sq mi)

Population (2010/IBGE)
  - Total: 370,203
  - Density: 18.4/km^{2} (48/sq mi)
- Time zone: UTC-3 (BRT)
  - Summer (DST): UTC-2 (BRST)
- CEP postal code: 39000-00
- Area code: +55 33

Vale do Mucuri (English: Mucuri River valley) is one of the twelve mesoregions of the Brazilian state of Minas Gerais. It is composed of 23 municipalities, distributed across 2 microregions.
