= Nanuque =

Coordinates: 17°50′36″S 40°21′06″W

Nanuque, Minas Gerais, Brazil
- Municipality
- Município de Nanuque; Municipality of Nanuque
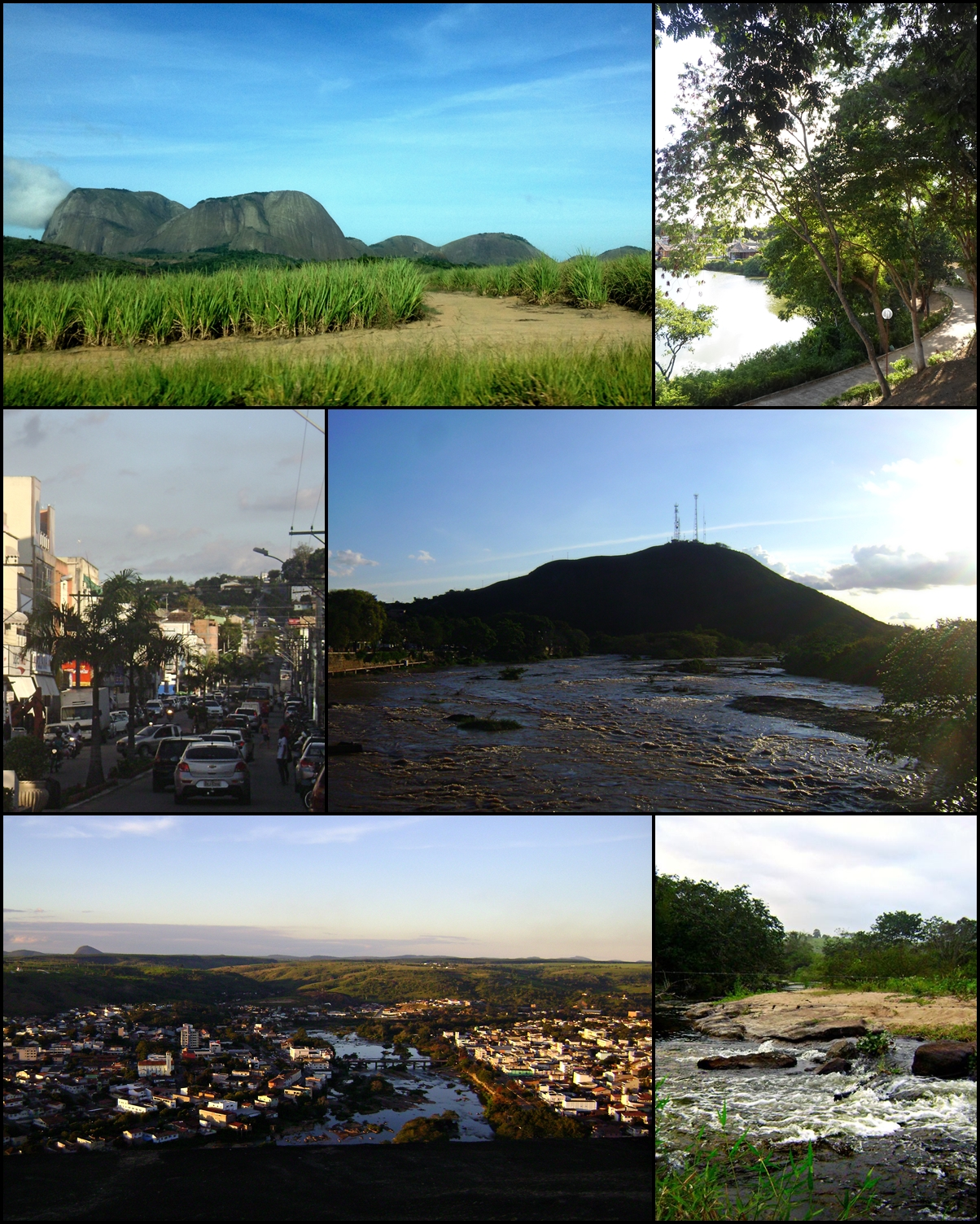
- Fritz Rock, Presidente Bueno's Rock, Namorados Pond

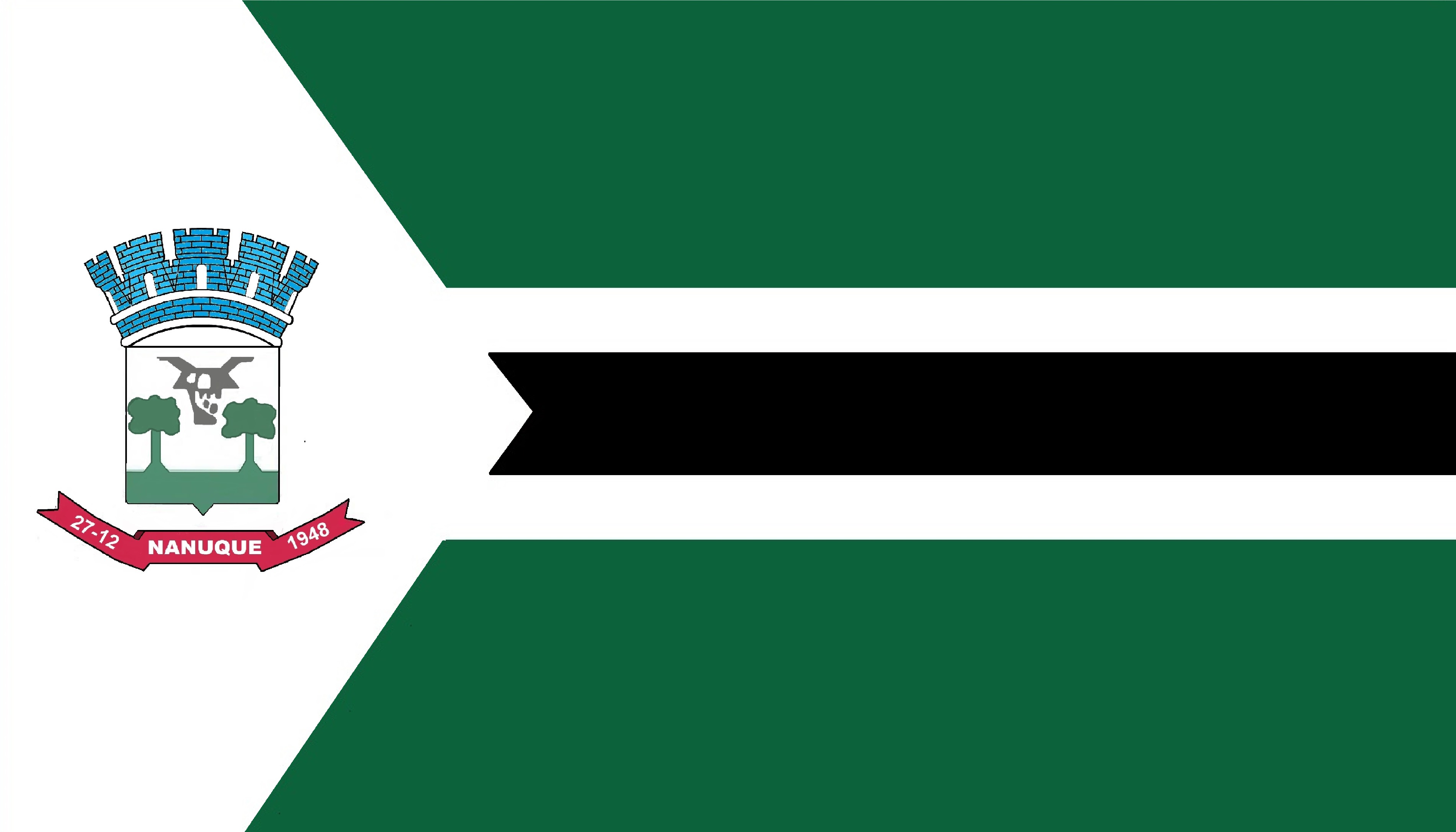
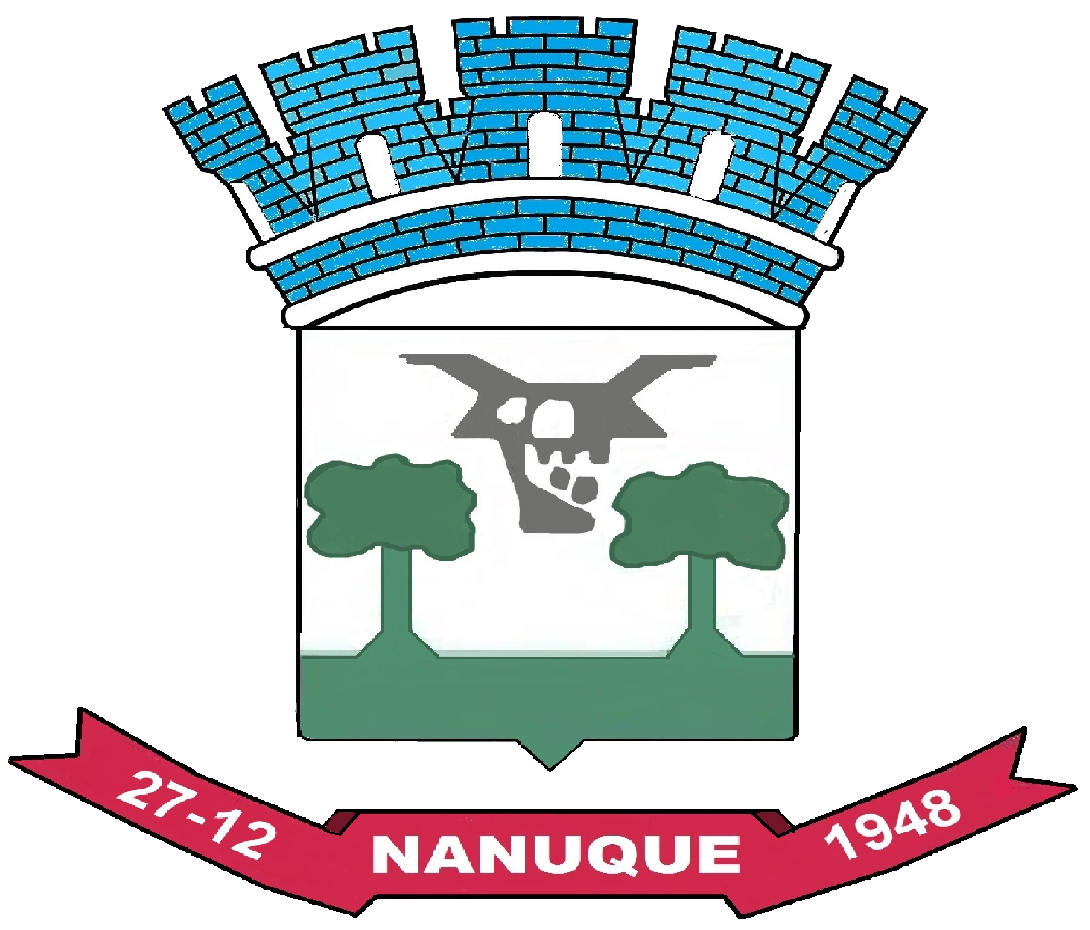
- Flag Coat of arms

- Country: Brazil
- Region: Southeast
- State: Minas Gerais
- Intermediate Geographic Region: Teófilo Otoni
- Immediate Geographic Region: Teófilo Otoni
- Founded: 1948
- Incorporated (as city): December 27, 1948

Government
  - Mayor: Ramon Ferraz Miranda (PSL) (2013-2016)

Area
  - Total: 1,515.370 km^{2} (585.088 sq mi)
- Elevation: 1,217 m (3,993 ft)

Population (2020)
  - Total: 40,665
- Nanuquense
- Time zone: UTC−3 (BRT)
- Postal Code: 39860-000
- Area code: +55 33
- Website: nanuque.mg.gov.br

Nanuque is a municipality in the state of Minas Gerais, in the southeastern region of Brazil, belonging to Mucuri Valley and the Nanuque region. The relief consists of inselbergs and seas of hills, and the Serra dos Aimorés as predominant characteristic. It is the 79th most populous city in the state, and the 2nd within its region, with 40,665 inhabitants according to the 2020 estimate.

== Geography ==
Nanuque is located in the valley of the Mucuri River at an elevation of 131 meters. It lies in a corner of Minas Gerais with the boundary lines of Bahia to the north and east, and that of Espírito Santo to the south. The Serra dos Aimorés lies to the north.

Neighboring municipalities are: Medeiros Neto (BA), Lajedão (BA) (north); Montanha (ES), Mucurici (ES) (south); Serra dos Aimorés (MG), Mucuri (BA) (east) and Carlos Chagas (MG) (west). The distance to Belo Horizonte is 603 km.

The climate is humid tropical with temperatures varying between maximums of 39° and minimums of 20°. The annual rainfall is around 1,064 mm.

== Economic activities ==
The economy is based on cattle raising, small industries, services, and agriculture, with the main crops being beans, sugarcane (2,128 ha.), soybeans, and corn. There was an alcohol distilling plant using the sugarcane produced locally. The cattle industry was very important with 143,000 head in 2005. In 2005 there were 372 rural producers but only 106 tractors. 1,200 persons were dependent on agriculture. There were 4,264 automobiles in 2006, giving a ratio of 5 inhabitants per automobile (there were 4,600 motorcycles). There were 5 banks in 2007.

== Tourism ==
Nanuque is a tourist town belonging to the Gemstones circuit, characterized by its high mountains of the Sierra Aimorés. In its urban environment, Nanuque has tourist accommodation, restaurants, plazas, and lakes.

Among the natural attractions are the Serra dos Aimorés, where can be seen the boundaries of three states rising in Fritz's Stone, which is 25 km from the center of Nanuque and is about a thousand meters high, one of the biggest points of mountaineering northeast of Minas Gerais. Fritz's Stone is used to practice sports like skydiving and mountain climbing, because of its huge stone wall.

The city also has the President Bueno Stone, with views of the city, the Mucuri River, a place for canoeing, the St. Helena Quarry, which is a lookout point north of the city the Tree of Herons in the central area.

== Health and education ==
Health assistance (2004)is provided by three hospitals with 154 beds and six health clinics in the urban area, two in the rural area and five teams of the Program called Health in the Family. There are also five laboratories and nine pharmacies. According to the local government there were 39 doctors, 32 dentists, 8 pharmacists, seven nurses, and 68 nursing assistants.

Educational needs were met by 22 primary schools (6 private), 6 middle schools (2 private), and 17 pre-schools (6 private). There was three branches of higher education: Fundação Educacional de Caratinga-FUNEC, Sociedade de Ensino Superior de Nanuque, and Unipac.

Nanuque is ranked in the lower-middle on the MHDI.

- MHDI: .708 (2000)
- State ranking: 512 out of 853 municipalities
- National ranking: 2,861 out of 5,138 municipalities in 2000
- Life expectancy: 63
- Literacy rate: 80
- Combined primary, secondary and tertiary gross enrolment ratio: .796
- Per capita income (monthly): R$226.00
- Degree of urbanization: 90.78
- Percentage of urban residences connected to sewage system: 80.10
- Infant mortality rate: 9.71

The above figures can be compared with those of Poços de Caldas, which had an MHDI of .841, the highest in the state of Minas Gerais. The highest in the country was São Caetano do Sul in the state of São Paulo with an MHDI of .919. The lowest was Manari in the state of Pernambuco with an MHDI of .467 out of a total of 5504 municipalities in the country as of 2004. At last count Brazil had 5,561 municipalities so this might have changed at the time of this writing.

== See also ==
- List of municipalities in Minas Gerais
